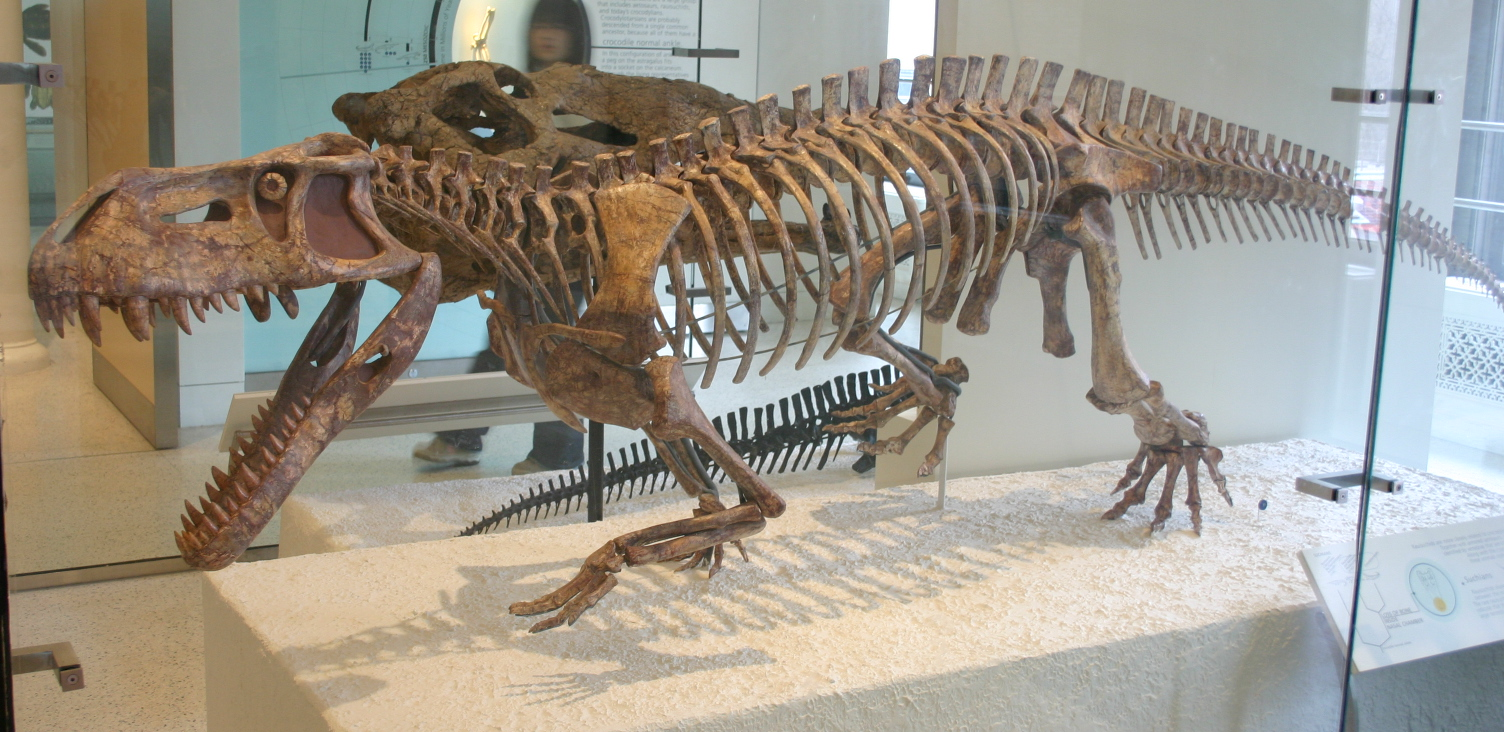
- Mounted skeleton of Prestosuchus chiniquensis (a basal loricatan) in the American Museum of Natural History.

Scientific classification
- Kingdom: Animalia
- Phylum: Chordata
- Class: Reptilia
- Clade: Pseudosuchia
- Clade: Suchia
- (unranked): †Rauisuchia; Huene, 1942

Groups included
- Poposauroidea; Rauisuchidae; Prestosuchidae

Cladistically included but traditionally excluded taxa
- Crocodylomorpha

= Rauisuchia =

"Rauisuchians" Temporal range: Triassic, 249–201 Ma Descendant taxon Crocodylomorpha survives to present.

Informal group of Triassic archosaurs with pillar-erect posture

"Rauisuchia" is a paraphyletic group of mostly large and carnivorous Triassic archosaurs. Rauisuchians are a category of archosaurs within a larger group called Pseudosuchia, which encompasses all archosaurs more closely related to crocodilians than to birds, pterosaurs and other dinosaurs. First named in the 1940s, Rauisuchia was a name exclusive to Triassic archosaurs which were generally large (often 4 to 6 metres (13 to 20 ft)), carnivorous, and quadrupedal with a pillar-erect hip posture, though exceptions exist for all of these traits. Rauisuchians, as a traditional taxonomic group, were considered distinct from other Triassic archosaur groups such as early dinosaurs, phytosaurs (crocodile-like carnivores), aetosaurs (armored herbivores), and crocodylomorphs (lightly-built near crocodilian ancestors).

However, more recent studies on archosaur evolution have upended this idea based on phylogenetic analyses and cladistics, a modern approach to taxonomy based on clades (nested monophyletic groups of common ancestry). Since the early 2010s, archosaur classification schemes have stabilized on a system where Rauisuchia is rendered an evolutionary grade, or even a wastebin taxon. Crocodylomorphs most likely originated from a rauisuchian ancestor based on a myriad of shared traits, and some "rauisuchians" (such as Postosuchus and Rauisuchus) appear to be more closely related to crocodylomorphs than to other "rauisuchians" (such as Prestosuchus and Saurosuchus).

As a result, Rauisuchia in its traditional usage may be considered paraphyletic: a group which is defined by shared ancestry but also excludes a descendant taxon (in this case, crocodylomorphs). To designate it as an informal group in scientific literature, the name is often enclosed in quotation marks. Several monophyletic groups have been erected to classify "rauisuchians" in a cladistic framework. The closest concept is the clade Paracrocodylomorpha, which includes most "rauisuchian" taxa and their crocodylomorph descendants. Paracrocodylomorpha is divided into two branches: Poposauroidea, which includes a variety of strange "rauisuchians" (some of which were bipedal and/or herbivorous) and Loricata, which includes most typical "rauisuchians" and crocodylomorphs.

== Characteristics ==
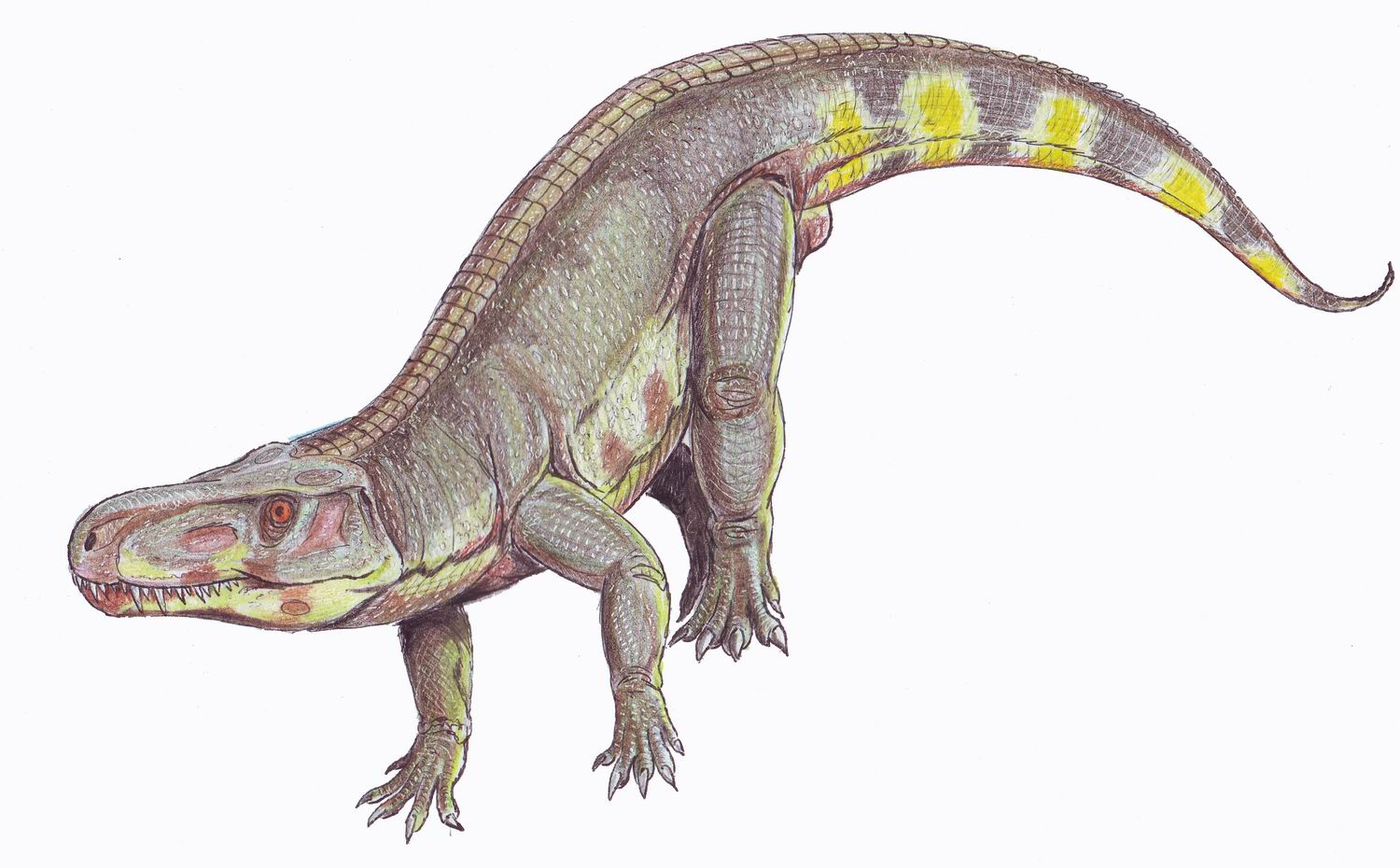
Restoration of Batrachotomus, a Middle Triassic rauisuchian from Germany. This genus is known from abundant fossil material and belongs to the clade Loricata

Hip joint and hindlimb postures of (1) "sprawling" amniotes (lizards and crocodilians) (2) "erect" amniotes (mammals and dinosaurs), and (3) "pillar-erect" amniotes ("rauisuchians" and aetosaurs)

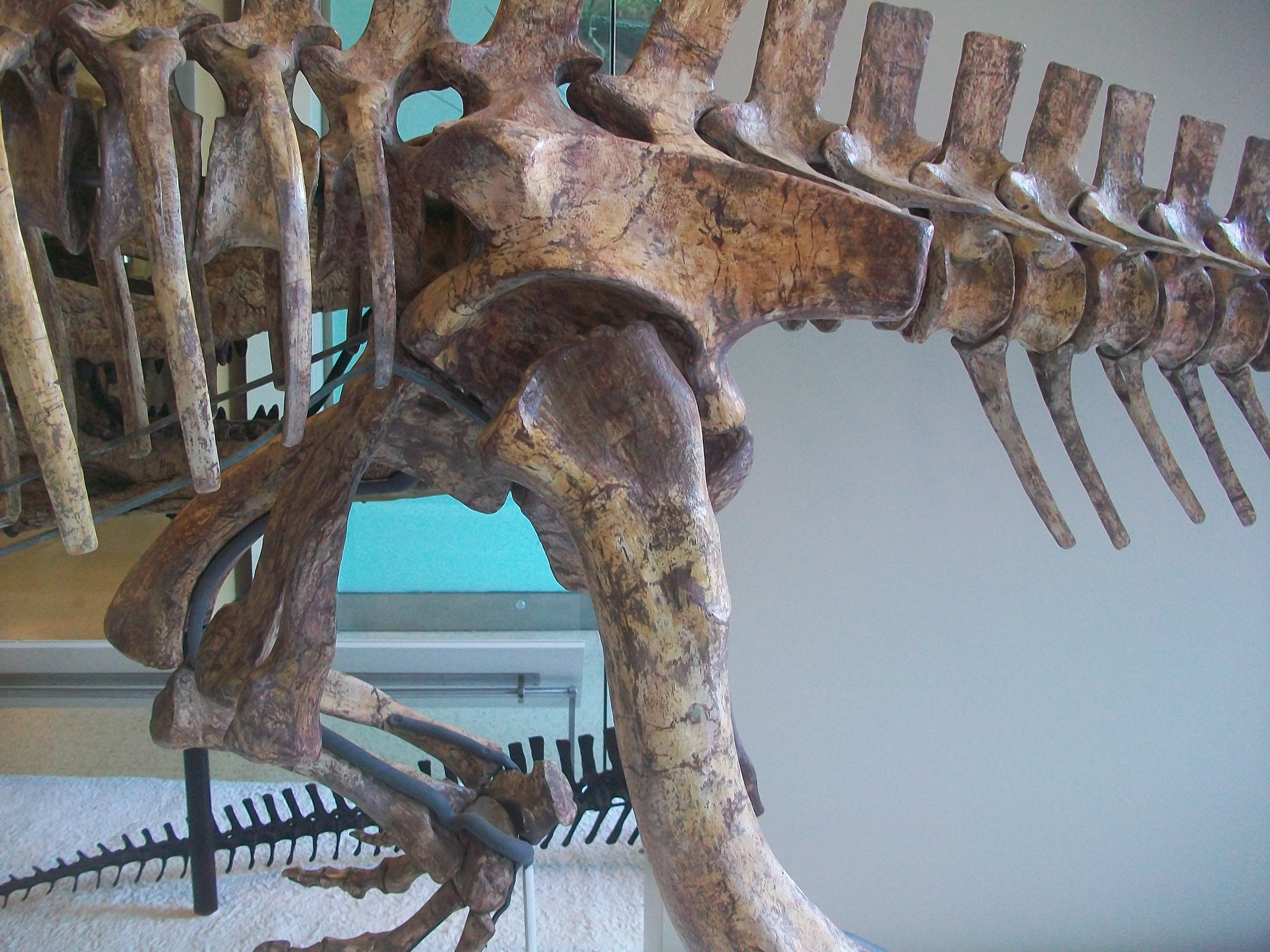
The hip of Prestosuchus (AMNH 3856)

"Rauisuchians" had an erect gait with their legs oriented vertically beneath the body rather than sprawling outward. This type of gait is also seen in dinosaurs, but evolved independently in the two groups. In dinosaurs, the hip socket faces outward and the femur (thigh bone) connects to the side of the hip; while in rauisuchians, the hip socket faces downward to form a shelf of bone under which the femur connects. This has been referred to as the pillar-erect posture.

"Rauisuchians" lived throughout most of the Triassic. The group died out in the late Triassic, before the Triassic-Jurassic extinction event (barring crocodylomorphs, which survive to the present in the form of crocodilians). After their extinction, theropod dinosaurs were able to emerge as the sole large terrestrial predators, though there is still some debate over how the extinction influenced dinosaur evolution. The footprints of meat-eating dinosaurs may have suddenly increased in size at the start of the Jurassic, when rauisuchians were absent. However, the apparent increase in dinosaur footprint size has instead been argued to be a result of increasing abundance of large theropods, rather than an abrupt acquisition of large size.

The name "Rauisuchia" comes from the genus Rauisuchus, which was named after fossil collector Dr. Wilhelm Rau. The name Rauisuchus means Wilhelm Rau's crocodile.

== History of classification ==
"Rauisuchians" were originally thought to be related to erythrosuchids, but it is now known that they are pseudosuchians. Three families have historically been recognised: Prestosuchidae, Rauisuchidae, and Poposauridae, as well as a number of forms (e.g. those from the Olenekian of Russia) that are too primitive and/or poorly known to fit in any of these groups.

There has been considerable suggestion that the group as currently defined is paraphyletic, representing a number of related lineages independently evolving and filling the same ecological niche of medium to top terrestrial predator. For example, Parrish (1993) and Juul (1994) considered poposaurid rauisuchians to be more closely related to Crocodilia than to prestosuchids. Nesbitt (2003) presented a different phylogeny with a monophyletic Rauisuchia. The group may even be something of a "wastebasket taxon". Determining exact phylogenetic relationships is difficult because of the scrappy nature of a lot of the material. However, further discoveries and studies, such as a study on the braincase of Batrachotomus (2002) and restudies of other forms, such as Erpetosuchus (2002) have shed some light on the evolutionary relationships of this poorly known group.

=== Cladistics ===
Despite its inclusion as an informal grouping in numerous phylogenetic studies, "Rauisuchia" has never received a formal definition. Most analyses in the past decade have found "Rauisuchia" to be a paraphyletic grouping, including all studies with a large sample size. Those that found the possibility that it was a natural group produced only weak support for this hypothesis. In his large 2011 analysis of archosaurian relationships, Nesbitt recommended that the term "Rauisuchia" be abandoned.

In a study of the ctenosauriscid Arizonasaurus, paleontologist Sterling Nesbitt defined a clade of rauisuchians called "Group X". This group includes Arizonasaurus, Lotosaurus, Sillosuchus, Shuvosaurus, and Effigia. One distinguishing feature of Group X is their lack of osteoderms, which are common among many other crurotarsans. Many more features are found in the pelvis, including fully fused sacral vertebrae and a long, thin crest on the ilium called the supra-acetabular crest. Additionally, many members of Group X have smooth frontal and nasal bones, which make up the upper portion of the rostrum. In other "rauisuchians" and many other crurotarsans, this area has bumps and ridges. "Group X" is now termed Poposauroidea.

Nesbitt later erected another clade, "Group Y", in 2007. Group Y falls within Group X to include Sillosuchus, Shuvosaurus, and Effigia. Group Y is diagnosed by the presence of four or more sacral vertebrae with fully fused neural arches, which is also seen in theropod dinosaurs (a case of evolutionary convergence). In addition, the cervical vertebrae that make up the neck are strongly amphicoelus, meaning that they are concave at both ends. The fourth trochanter, a ridge of bone on the femur for muscle attachment seen in nearly all archosaurs, is absent in Group Y. "Group Y" is now termed Shuvosauridae.

Although not placed within Group Y, Lotosaurus shares many similarities with members of the clade, foremost of which is edentulous, or toothless, jaws. Edentulism is also seen in Shuvosaurus and Effigia, which have beak-like jaws. Nesbitt suggested that the derived characters of Lotosaurus may indicate that it is a transitional form between basal members of Group X and members of Group Y.

Below is the cladogram from Nesbitt (2007):

- Rauisuchia
  - - Postosuchus
    - Rauisuchus
  - Group X
    - Arizonasaurus
    - - Lotosaurus
      - Group Y
        - Sillosuchus
        - - Shuvosaurus
          - Effigia

In their phylogenetic study of archosaurs, Brusatte et al. (2010) found only weak support for Rauisuchia as a monophyletic grouping. As a result of their analysis, two clades were found to be within Rauisuchia, which they named Rauisuchoidea and Poposauroidea. Rauisuchoidea included Rauisuchidae and Prestosuchidae, as well as several basal taxa that were once assigned to the families, including Fasolasuchus and Ticinosuchus. Poposauroidea included poposaurids and ctenosauriscids, but the phylogeny had a large polytomy of genera in both groups that was difficult to resolve, which included Arizonasaurus, Poposaurus, and Sillosuchus. However, the characters linking these two groups were weak, and the question as to whether or not "Rauisuchia" forms a natural group remains unresolved. Brusatte et al. (2010) was one of the last studies to find a monophyletic Rauisuchia clade.

Below is the cladogram from Brusatte et al. (2010):

- Rauisuchia
  - Rauisuchoidea
    - - Arganasuchus
      - - Fasolasuchus
        - - Stagonosuchus
          - Ticinosuchus
    - - Prestosuchidae
        - Saurosuchus
        - - Batrachotomus
          - Prestosuchus
      - Rauisuchidae
        - Tikisuchus
        - - Rauisuchus
          - - Postosuchus
            - Teratosaurus
  - Poposauroidea
    - Yarasuchus
    - - Qianosuchus
      - - Arizonasaurus
        - Bromsgroveia
        - Lotosaurus
        - Poposaurus
        - Sillosuchus
        - Shuvosauridae
          - Effigia
          - Shuvosaurus

In a more thorough test of archosaurian relationships published in 2011 by Sterling Nesbitt, "rauisuchians" were found to be paraphyletic, with Poposauroidea at the base of the clade Paracrocodylomorpha, and the rest of the "rauisuchians" forming a grade within the clade Loricata. Nesbitt noted that no previous study of "rauisuchian" relationships had ever included a wide variety of supposed "rauisuchians" as well as a large number of non-"rauisuchian" taxa as controls.

== Fossil record ==
Well-known "rauisuchians" include Ticinosuchus of the Middle Triassic of Switzerland and Northern Italy, Saurosuchus of the Late Triassic (late Carnian) of Argentina, Prestosuchus of the Middle-Late Triassic (late Ladinian-early Carnian) of Brazil, and Postosuchus of the Late Triassic (Norian) of the southwest United States. The first "rauisuchian" known to paleontology was Teratosaurus, a German genus from the Late Triassic (Norian) of Germany. However, Teratosaurus was considered an early theropod dinosaur for much of its history, before it was demonstrated to be non-dinosaurian in the 1980s. The concept of "rauisuchians" as a distinct group of reptiles distantly related to crocodiles was recognized by discoveries in Brazil in the 1940s (particularly Prestosuchus and Rauisuchus) and emphasized further by the description of Ticinosuchus in the 1960s.

The oldest known "rauisuchians", in terms of geological age, are probably from the end of the Early Triassic (late Olenekian). Most of these early fossils are fragmentary and dubious remains from Russia, but some are better-described and constrained, such as Xilousuchus, a ctenosauriscid from the Heshanggou Formation of China. Xilousuchus is neither the earliest-branching archosaur nor "rauisuchian" despite its early age, and its presence in the Early Triassic suggests that other archosaur fossils are simply undiscovered from that time. The last known "rauisuchians", excluding their descendants the crocodylomorphs, are from the latter part of the Late Triassic. The shuvosaurid Effigia, from the "siltstone member" of the Chinle Formation in New Mexico, may be as young as the Rhaetian, the last stage of the Triassic. Effigia was recovered from the Coelophysis Quarry of Ghost Ranch. The same site also preserves a large undescribed archosaur, CM 73372, which seemingly represents a transitional form between "rauisuchians" and crocodylomorphs. Indeterminate large paracrocodylomorph material from the Lower Elliot Formation of South Africa may be even younger, late Rhaetian or possibly even lowermost Jurassic.

=== List of rauisuchian genera ===
The following is a list of valid pseudosuchian genera which have been informally or formally classified as rauisuchians, as well as their modern cladistic interpretation. This list does not include genera named for dubious and poorly-diagnosed "rauisuchian" material from Russia (Dongusia, Energosuchus, Jaikosuchus, Jushatyria, Scythosuchus, Tsylmosuchus, Vjushkovisaurus, Vytshegdosuchus) and China (Fenhosuchus, Wangisuchus), nor taxa reclassified as non-"rauisuchian" archosaurs (Ornithosuchus, Gracilisuchus, Dongusuchus, Yarasuchus).

Genus	Authority	Year	Location	Unit	Age	Traditional classification	Modern classification	Notes	Images
Apatosuchus	Sues & Schoch	2013	Germany	Löwenstein Formation (Stubensandstein)	Norian	Theropoda	Loricata	A small "rauisuchian" based on a partial skull. Originally considered a species of Halticosaurus, a contemporary theropod dinosaur.	
Arganasuchus	Jalil & Peyer	2007	Morocco	Timezgadiouine Formation	Carnian?	Rauisuchidae	Loricata	A "rauisuchian" based on scant skull and postcranial material similar to that of Batrachotomus, Luperosuchus, and Postosuchus.	
Arizonasaurus	Welles	1947	United States	Moenkopi Formation	Anisian	Theropoda? Rauisuchia?	Poposauroidea (Ctenosauriscidae)	One of the most complete ctenosauriscids, owing to a partial skeleton with skull and hip material discovered in 2002. Vital for understanding the affinities of ctenosauriscids with poposaurs.	
Batrachotomus	Gower	1999	Germany	Erfurt Formation (Lower Keuper)	Late Ladinian	Prestosuchidae / Rauisuchidae	Loricata	One of the most completely-known "rauisuchians", with numerous fossils recovered from sites at Kupferzell, Crailsheim and Vellberg-Eschenau.	
Bromsgroveia	Galton	1985	United Kingdom	Bromsgrove Sandstone	Anisian	Theropoda / Temnospondyli /Poposauridae	Poposauroidea (Ctenosauriscidae)	Named based on a distinctive poposaur-like ilium, but also possibly incorporating "rauisuchian" fossil material such as teeth and vertebrae described from England since the mid-19th century.	
Bystrowisuchus	Sennikov	2012	Russia	Lipovskaya Formation (Gamskian Gorizont)	Late Olenekian?	Ctenosauriscidae	Poposauroidea (Ctenosauriscidae)	An early ctenosauriscid with low-spined cervical (neck) vertebrae similar to Xilousuchus.	
Ctenosauriscus	Kuhn	1964	Germany	Solling Formation	Late Olenekian to Anisian?	"Pelycosauria" / Temnospondyli / Ctenosauriscidae	Poposauroidea (Ctenosauriscidae)	Known from slabs of sail-backed dorsal vertebrae first discovered in 1871 and originally named as the (preoccupied) genus Ctenosaurus in 1902. Its affinities were strongly debated until stabilizing as poposauroid archosaur upon the discovery of new Arizonasaurus and Lotosaurus fossils.	
Dagasuchus	Lacerda et al.	2015	Brazil	Middle Santa Maria Formation (Santacruzodon Assemblage Zone)	Late Ladinian or early Carnian	N/A	Loricata	A medium-sized "rauisuchian" based on a hip bone which helps to fill a gap in the biostratigraphic record of Brazilian archosaurs.	
Decuriasuchus	França	2011	Brazil	Lower Santa Maria Formation (Dinodontosaurus Assemblage Zone)	Late Ladinian or early Carnian	Prestosuchidae	Loricata	A medium-sized "rauisuchian" named from 10 individuals (including several nearly-complete skeletons) which died and fossilized together, suggesting a gregarious social structure.	
Effigia	Nesbitt & Norell	2006	United States	Chinle Formation ("siltstone member")	Late Norian or Rhaetian	Derived Suchia	Poposauroidea (Shuvosauridae)	A bizarre pseudosuchian convergent on ornithomimids, with a toothless skull, theropod-like hip, and very short arms. Discovered within a sediment block collected from the Coelophysis Quarry of Ghost Ranch, New Mexico.	
Etjosuchus	Tolchard et al.	2021	Namibia	Omingonde Formation	Ladinian or early Carnian	Erythrosuchidae	Loricata	A large and possibly bipedal "rauisuchian" based on a partial skeleton previously misattributed to the erythrosuchid Erythrosuchus.	
Fasolasuchus	Bonaparte	1981	Argentina	Los Colorados Formation	Late Norian	Rauisuchidae	Loricata	One of the last and largest "rauisuchians", occurring alongside an increasingly diverse fauna of sauropodomorph dinosaurs.	
Heptasuchus	Dawley et al.	1979	United States	Popo Agie Formation	Late Carnian?	Prestosuchidae?	Loricata	One of the oldest predatory archosaurs from North America, based on skull and postcranial fragments from Wyoming. Probably a close relative of Batrachotomus.	
Hypselorhachis	Butler et al.	2009	Tanzania	Manda Formation	Anisian? to Carnian?	Ctenosauriscidae	Poposauroidea (Ctenosauriscidae)	A ctenosauriscid based on a single well-preserved vertebra with a very long neural spine. First mentioned in an unpublished 1966 by Alan Charig, but not formally described until 2009.	
Lotosaurus	Zhang	1975	China	Badong Formation	Anisian? to Carnian?	"Lotosauridae"	Poposauroidea	An unusual quadruped combining a neural spine sail with a toothless skull. Known from abundant fossils clustered into a bonebed, but most of these fossils remain undescribed.	
Luperosuchus	Romer	1971	Argentina	Chanares Formation (Tarjadia Assemblage Zone)	Late Ladinian or earliest Carnian	Prestosuchidae	Loricata (Prestosuchidae?)	A medium-sized "rauisuchian" with a skull similar to Prestosuchus and Saurosuchus.	
Mambawakale	Butler et al.	2022	Tanzania	Manda Formation	Anisian? to Carnian?	"Pallisteriidae"	Basal Paracrocodylomorpha?	A possible paracrocodylomorph based on a massive partial skull. Mentioned as "Pallisteria angustimentum" in an unpublished 1967 manuscript by Alan Charig, but not formally described (and provided a new scientific name) until 2022.	
Mandasuchus	Butler et al.	2018	Tanzania	Manda Formation	Anisian? to Carnian?	Prestosuchidae?	Basal Paracrocodylomorpha?	One of the most basal loricatans or poposauroids, first mentioned in a 1956 doctoral thesis by Alan Charig but not formally described until 2018.	
Polonosuchus	Brusatte et al.	2009	Poland	Krasiejów claypit	Late Carnian?	Rauisuchidae	Loricata (Rauisuchidae)	A large rauisuchid, formerly named as a species of Teratosaurus and currently considered a close relative of Postosuchus.	
Poposaurus	Mehl	1915	United States	Popo Agie Formation, Dockum Group, Chinle Formation (Monitor Butte Member, Blue Mesa Member, Sonsela Member)	Late Carnian? to middle Norian	Dinosauria / Poposauridae	Poposauroidea (Poposauridae)	A widespread bipedal carnivore with hip bones so similar to dinosaurs that for decades it was mistaken as one. Though skull fragments are very rare, the postcrania is well-described according to a nearly complete skeleton discovered in Utah in 2003.	
Postosuchus	Chatterjee	1985	United States	Cooper Canyon Formation, Chatham Group?, Chinle Formation?	Norian	Poposauridae / Rauisuchidae	Loricata (Rauisuchidae)	A large rauisuchid with a short skull and possibly bipedal locomotion. One of the most well-described and widespread "rauisuchians" from North America, though not all fossils referred to the genus may actually belong to it. Proposed as an ancestor to tyrannosaurids when first described.	
Prestosuchus	Huene	1942	Brazil	Lower Santa Maria Formation (Dinodontosaurus Assemblage Zone)	Late Ladinian or early Carnian	Prestosuchidae	Loricata (Prestosuchidae)	Among the largest and most well-described "rauisuchians", a quadrupedal form based on multiple partial skeletons. One massive well-preserved skull has been named under the dubious genus "Karamuru vorax".	
Procerosuchus	Huene	1938	Brazil	Lower Santa Maria Formation (Dinodontosaurus Assemblage Zone)	Late Ladinian or early Carnian	Prestosuchidae	Loricata (Prestosuchidae?)	A poorly-known taxon, possibly a synonym or species of Prestosuchus.	
Qianosuchus	Li et al.	2006	China	Guanling Formation (Panxian biota)	Anisian	Indeterminate Crurotarsi	Poposauroidea	A small, gracile archosaur, the only known "rauisuchians" with semiaquatic and piscivorous habits owing to its narrow skull and tall tail vertebrae.	
Rauisuchus	Huene	1942	Brazil	Upper Santa Maria Formation (Hyperodapedon Assemblage Zone)	Middle-late Carnian	Rauisuchidae	Loricata (Rauisuchidae)	The namesake of Rauisuchia. Known primarily from skull, vertebral, and hindlimb fossils, which reconstruct a stocky quadrupedal predator with a boxy skull full of serrated teeth.	
Saurosuchus	Reig	1959	Argentina	Ischigualasto Formation	Late Carnian	Prestosuchidae	Loricata (Prestosuchidae?)	A very large quadruped which lived alongside some of the earliest dinosaurs. Fossils include a well-preserved cranium.	
Scolotosuchus	Sennikov	2023	Russia	Lipovskaya Formation	Late Olenekian	Rauisuchidae	"Rauisuchidae"	A medium-sized "rauisuchian" with distinctive vertebrae	
Shuvosaurus	Chatterjee	1993	United States	Cooper Canyon Formation	Early-middle Norian	Theropoda / "Chatterjeeidae"	Poposauroidea (Shuvosauridae)	An unusual beaked biped with two sets of fossils independently discovered in the mid-1990s: a toothless skull (Shuvosaurus) attributed to an ornithomimosaur-like dinosaur, and postcranial material ("Chatterjeea") comparable to poposaurids. The synonymy between these two fossil sets would not be confirmed until the discovery of Effigia, a close relative.	
Sillosuchus	Alcober & Parrish	1997	Argentina	Ischigualasto Formation	Late Carnian	Poposauridae	Poposauroidea (Shuvosauridae)	A probable relative of Effigia and Shuvosaurus based on its vertebrae and hip fossils. May have reached up to 10 meters (33 ft) in length according to a large isolated vertebra.	
Stagonosuchus	Huene	1938	Tanzania	Manda Formation	Anisian? to Carnian?	Prestosuchidae	Loricata	A large tanzanian archosaur named from two specimens, mostly containing postcranial material	
Teratosaurus	Meyer	1861	Germany	Löwenstein Formation (Stubensandstein)	Norian	Carnosauria / Rauisuchidae / Poposauridae	Loricata (Rauisuchidae?)	The earliest "rauisuchian" to be named, though its holotype fossil (a toothed maxilla bone) was misidentified as that of an early carnosaurian dinosaur. A complete re-evaluation of archosaur systematics in the 1980s involved the recognition that Teratosaurus (and other "rauisuchians") were completely unrelated to carnosaurian dinosaurs.	
Ticinosuchus	Krebs	1965	Switzerland, Italy	Mittlere Grenzbitumenzone	Late Anisian	Prestosuchidae	Suchia (non-paracrocodylomorph)	Described from a flattened but complete skeleton from Monte San Giorgio on the Swiss-Italian border. Its discovery established knowledge of "rauisuchian" proportions and their association with chirothere footprints. Commonly considered the sister taxon to Paracrocodylomorpha.	
Tikisuchus	Chatterjee & Majumdar	1987	India	Tiki Formation	Carnian?	Rauisuchidae	Loricata (Rauisuchidae?)	A medium-sized probable rauisuchid with a proportionally large skull.	
Vivaron	Lessner et al.	2016	United States	Chinle Formation (Petrified Forest Member)	Middle Norian	N/A	Loricata (Rauisuchidae)	Known from Postosuchus-like skull and hip fragments from the Hayden Quarry at Ghost Ranch, New Mexico. Its discovery casts doubt on the assumption that all rauisuchid fossils from the southwestern United States can be referred to Postosuchus.	
Xilousuchus	Wu	1981	China	Heshanggou Formation	Late Olenekian or early Anisian	Proterosuchidae / Erythrosuchidae	Poposauroidea (Ctenosauriscidae)	One of the better-understood early "rauisuchians", a ctenosauriscid including skull, braincase, and cervical (neck) fossils.	
Youngosuchus	Young	1973	China	Ermaying Formation	Anisian?	Erythrosuchidae /Rauisuchidae?	Loricata	Based on a well-preserved but poorly-described partial skeleton, including a skull. Originally named as a species of Vjushkovia, an erythrosuchid which has subsequently been synonymized with Garjainia.	
