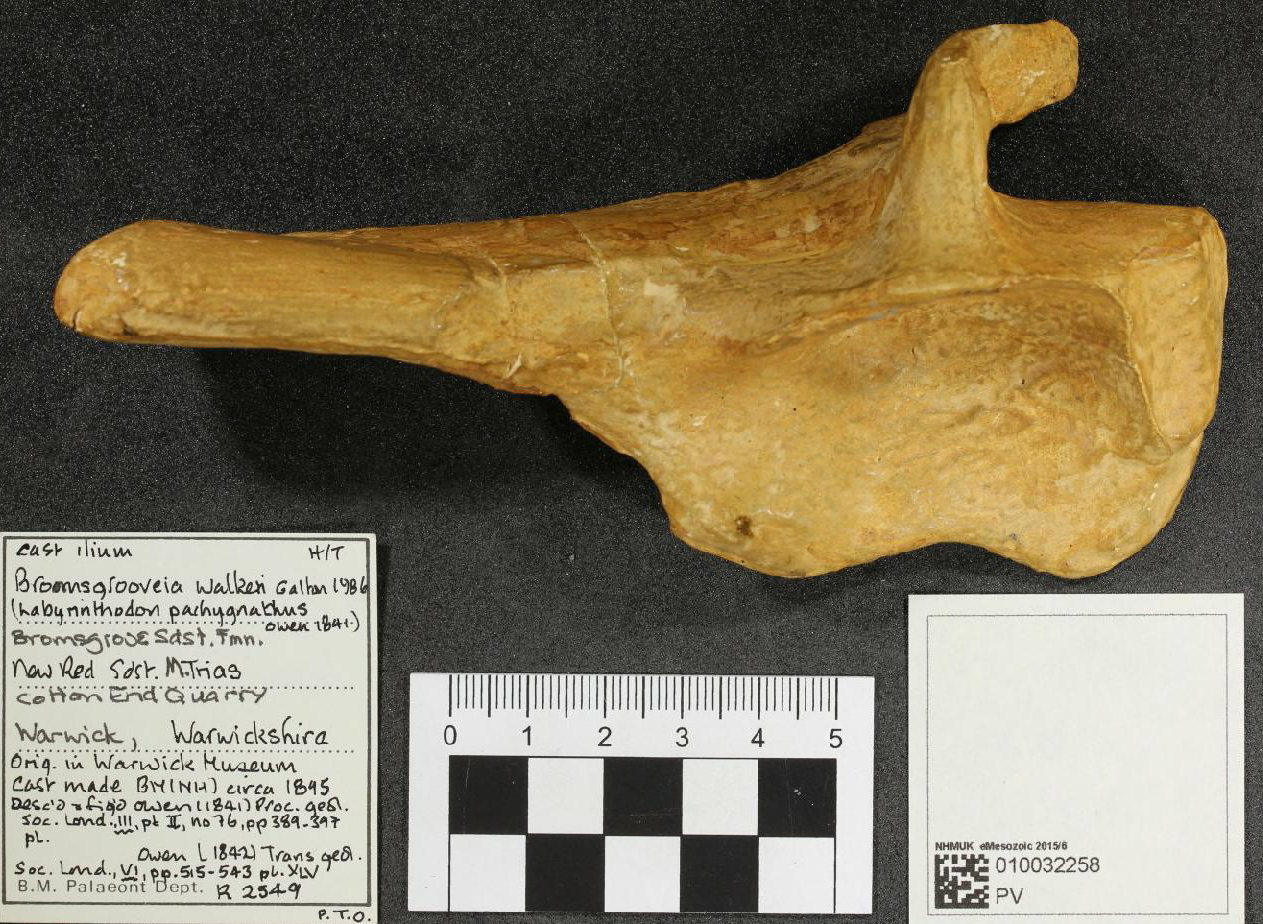
- Cast of the holotype ilium

Scientific classification
- Kingdom: Animalia
- Phylum: Chordata
- Class: Reptilia
- Clade: Pseudosuchia
- Clade: Paracrocodylomorpha
- Clade: †Poposauroidea
- Family: †Ctenosauriscidae
- Genus: †Bromsgroveia; Galton, 1985

Type species
- †Bromsgroveia walkeri Galton, 1985

= Bromsgroveia =

Bromsgroveia Temporal range: Middle Triassic, ~247.2–242 Ma

Extinct genus of reptiles

Bromsgroveia is an extinct genus of predatory ctenosauriscid archosaur from the Middle Triassic Bromsgrove Sandstone of England. Ctenosauriscids were a group of rauisuchians that was related to the ancestors of modern crocodiles and alligators.

== Discovery and naming ==
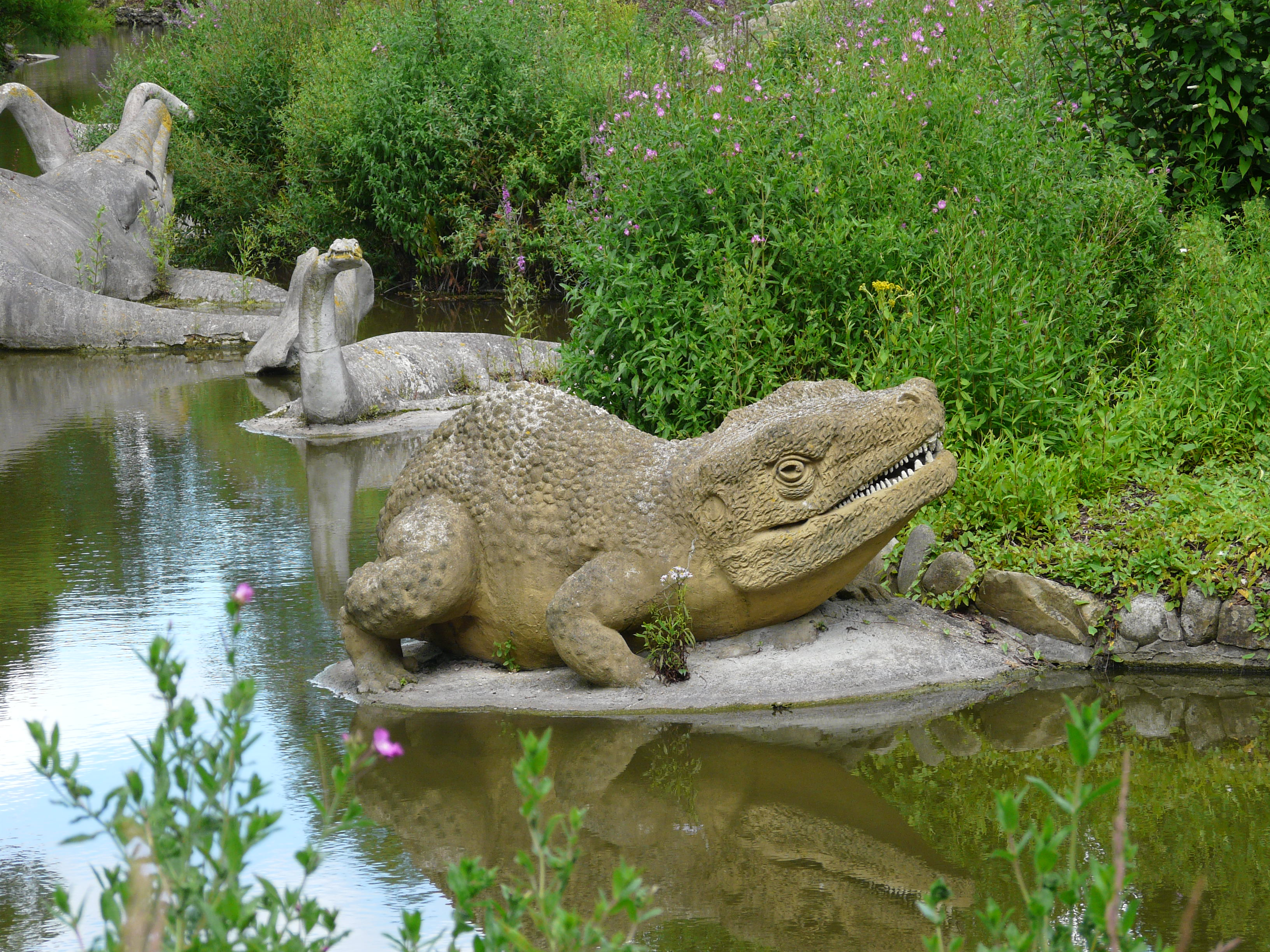
Frog-like sculpture in Crystal Palace based on fossils of Bromsgroveia and mastodonsaurids

The holotype is a right ilium (WM G3a, b; cast as NHMUK PV R 2549) and it was collected from Coton Green Quarry, Warwickshire where the Bromsgrove Sandstone can be found. Owen (1842) assigned WM G3a alongside remains now known to belong to the Mastodonsauridae to Labyrinthodon pachygnathus (now Mastodonsaurus); Owen believed it was a large frog. A cast of the ilium was made around 1895 which was sent to the NHMUK.

Galton (1985) named and described Bromsgroveia walkeri based on WM G3a as the holotype, and he also classified it into Rauisuchia. Galton also referred additional material collected from the same locality, including a sacrum (WM G2.1, 2), a first caudal vertebra (WM G2.5), and a left ischium (WM G2.970) as paratypes. Further remains found during the 1980s and 1990s included mid-cervical, dorsal, and caudal vertebrae, an ischium, and isolated teeth collected from the Bromsgrove Sandstone at Warwick, Leamington Spa, and Bromsgrove; they were described in a revision of the Bromsgroveia genus by Galton & Walker (1996).

== Classification ==
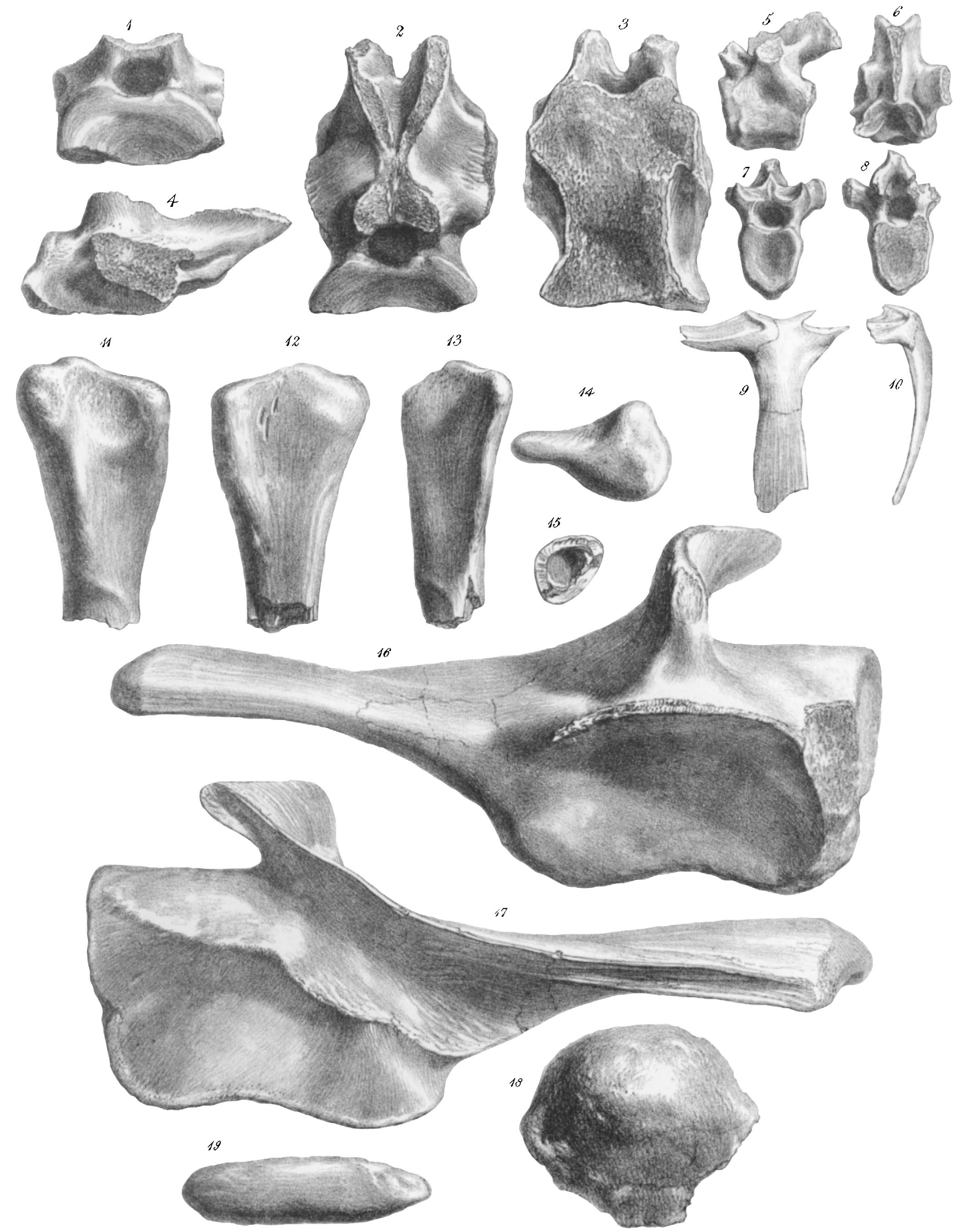
Bromsgroveia (1-3, 16-17; here identified as Labyrinthodon pachygnathus) and mastodonsaurid fossils, 1842

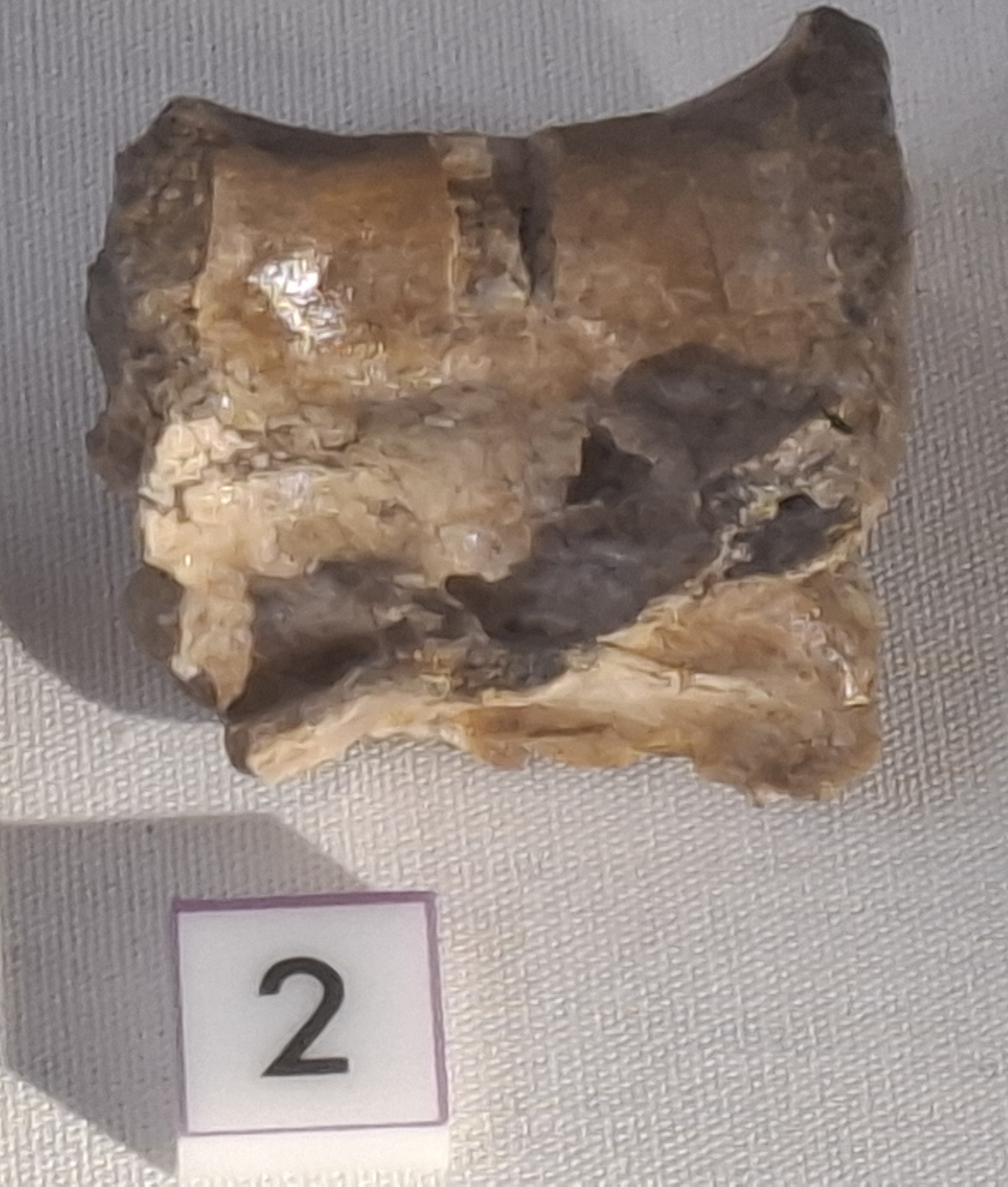
Vertebra

Bromsgroveia was closely related to Ctenosauriscus, and together with a few other genera they make up Ctenosauriscidae. The ctenosauriscids were closely related to the poposaurids, as shown by a few shared derived characteristics. The pelvic girdle in Bromsgroveia unites this taxon with Ctenosauriscus, Lotosaurus, Arizonasaurus, and Hypselorhachis.

Below is a phylogenetic cladogram simplified from Butler et al. in 2011 showing the cladistics of Archosauriformes, focusing mostly on Pseudosuchia:

- Poposauroidea
  - Qianosuchus
  - - Ctenosauriscidae
      - Arizonasaurus
      - Xilousuchus
      - Hypselorhachis
      - Ctenosauriscus
      - Bromsgroveia
      - Waldhaus Taxon
    - - - Poposaurus gracilis H
        - Poposaurus gracilis Y
      - - Lotosaurus
        - - Sillosuchus
          - - Shuvosaurus
            - Effigia
