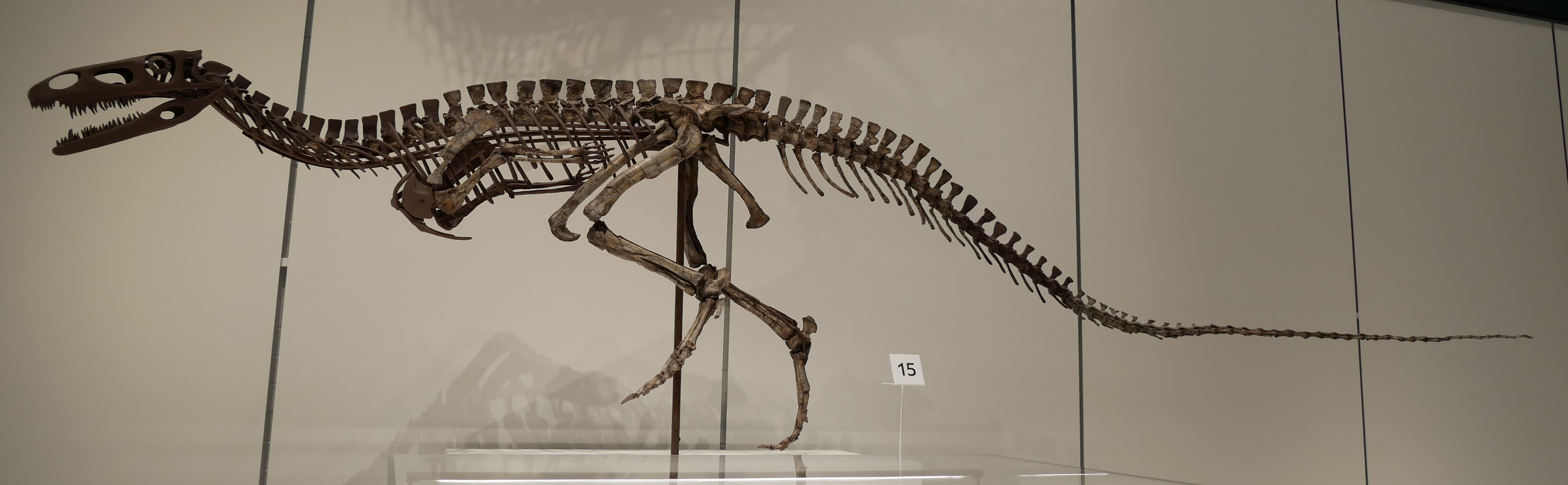
- Mounted skeleton at the Yale Peabody Museum, skull material described after shows a narrower anteorbital fenestra
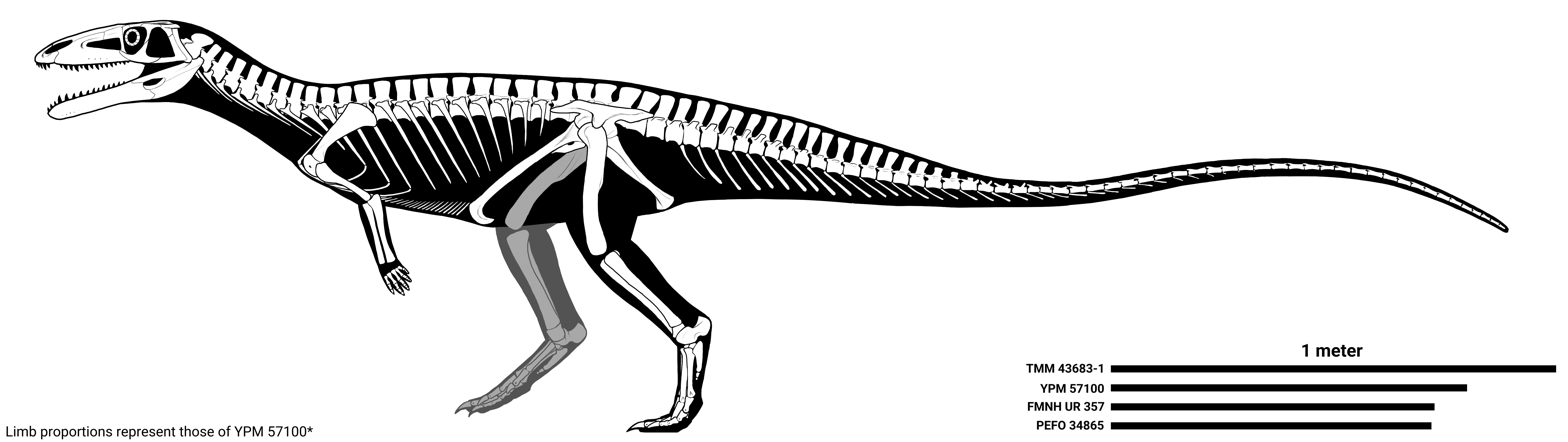
- Composite skeletal reconstruction

Scientific classification
- Kingdom: Animalia
- Phylum: Chordata
- Class: Reptilia
- Clade: Pseudosuchia
- Clade: †Poposauroidea
- Family: †Poposauridae
- Genus: †Poposaurus; Mehl, 1915

Species
- †P. gracilis Mehl, 1915 (type); †P. langstoni (Long and Murry, 1995 [originally Lythrosuchus langstoni])

Synonyms
- Lythrosuchus Long and Murry, 1995

= Poposaurus =

Poposaurus Temporal range: Late Triassic (Carnian to Norian), 237–216 Ma

Extinct genus of Archosaur

Poposaurus is an extinct genus of pseudosuchian archosaur from the Late Triassic of the southwestern and eastern United States. It belongs to the clade Poposauroidea, an unusual group of Triassic pseudosuchians that includes sail-backed, beaked, and aquatic forms. Fossils have been found in Wyoming, Utah, Arizona, Texas, and Virginia. Except for the skull, most parts of the skeleton are known. The type species, P. gracilis, was described and named by Maurice Goldsmith Mehl in 1915. A second species, P. langstoni, was originally the type species of the genus Lythrosuchus. Since it was first described, Poposaurus has been variously classified as a dinosaur, a phytosaur, and a "rauisuchian".

Like theropod dinosaurs, Poposaurus was an obligate biped, meaning that it walked on two legs rather than four. However, as a pseudosuchian, it is more closely related to living crocodilians than to dinosaurs. Poposaurus is thought to have evolved this form of locomotion independently, possibly from early archosaurs' ability to high walk.

== History ==
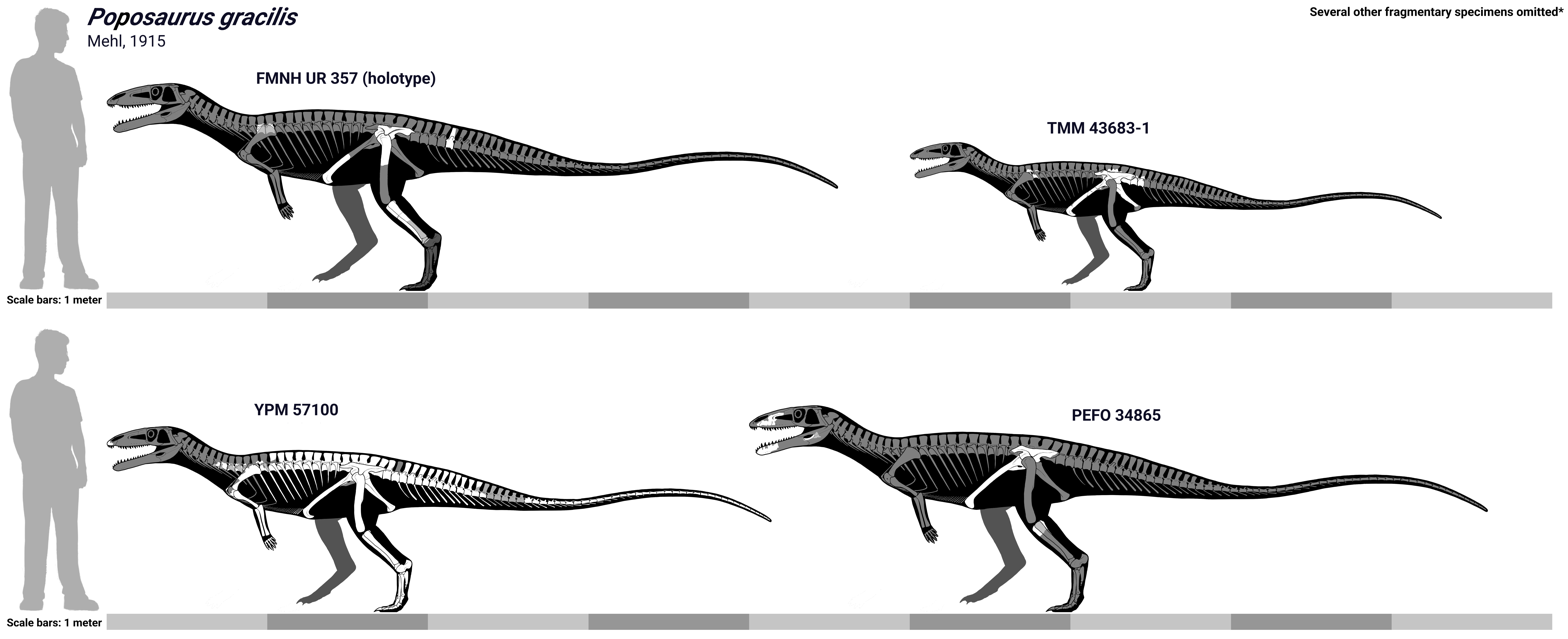
Skeletal reconstruction and size comparison of some known specimens of Poposaurus gracilis

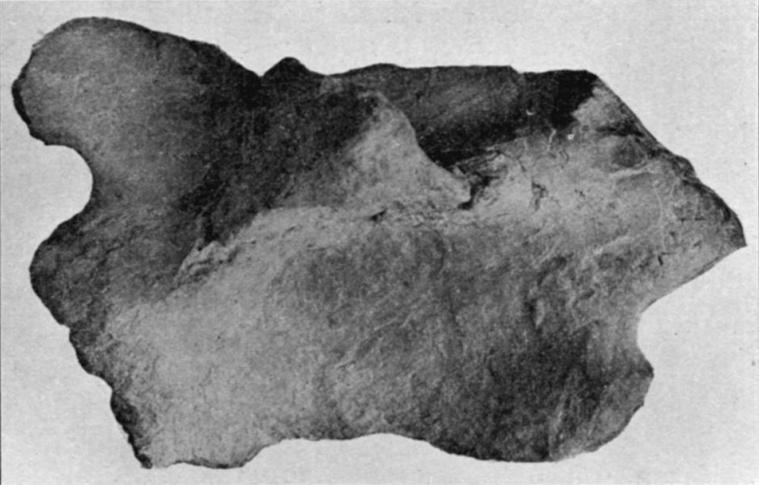
An ilium (hip bone) assigned to Paleorhinus bransoni by J. H. Lees and later identified as Poposaurus gracilis.

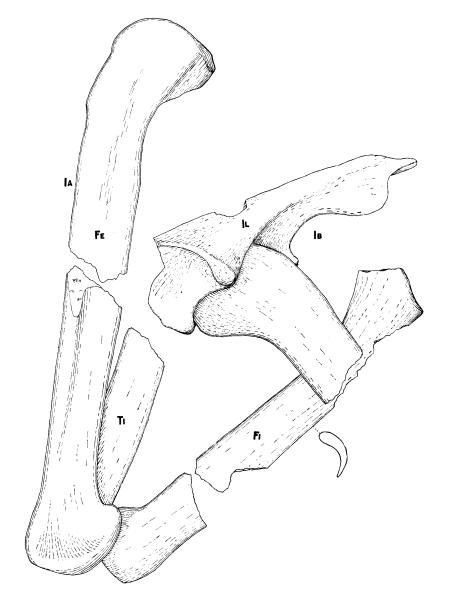
Illustration of the holotype

The first remains of Poposaurus were found in 1904 near Lander, Wyoming. In 1907, paleontologist J. H. Lees described this fossil, an ilium (part of the hip) from the Popo Agie Formation, and identified it as that of the phytosaur Paleorhinus bransoni. In 1915, paleontologist M. G. Mehl named Poposaurus based on more complete material from the Popo Agie Formation, including vertebrae, hips, and limb bones. He cited the holotype as [Walker Museum] 602, but in fact the holotype is UR 357. Mehl concluded that the ilium described by Lees, UR 358, also belonged to Poposaurus. He did not classify Poposaurus as a phytosaur because the shape of its ilium was different and it had more sacral vertebrae fused to the hip. Mehl made comparisons between Poposaurus and the earlier named Dolichobrachium, also from the Triassic of Wyoming. Dolichobrachium was only known from some teeth, a humerus, and part of the pectoral girdle, so Mehl suggested that the Poposaurus and Dolichobrachium material could belong to the same animal. Mehl noted similarities between Poposaurus and theropod dinosaurs, including its hollow leg bones and deep hip socket, but did not consider it a dinosaur because each sacral vertebra supported only one rib (theropods usually have multiple ribs projecting from each sacral vertebra).

In the following years, Poposaurus was assigned to many different groups of reptiles. Hungarian paleontologist Franz Nopcsa classified it as an ornithischian dinosaur in 1921, identifying similarities with iguanodonts and camptosaurs. In 1928, Nopcsa placed it in a new family called Poposauridae and a new suborder called Poposauroidea. To Nopsca, Poposauroidea was one of three suborders that made up the order Ornithopoda. Over the following years, many paleontologists supported this classification. For example, German paleontologist Oskar Kuhn classified Poposaurus in its own suborder of ornithischians, which he called Poposauria. In 1930, American paleontologist Oliver Perry Hay placed Poposaurus in Anchisauridae, a family of sauropodomorph dinosaurs. German paleontologist Friedrich von Huene considered it a very early stegosaur in 1950.

In 1961, American paleontologist Edwin Harris Colbert gave an extensive description of the known material of Poposaurus and classified it as a theropod dinosaur. Colbert thought that Poposaurus could not have been a more primitive archosaur because it had hollow leg bones and complex vertebrae. He placed it in the Carnosauria, but because its ilium was distinct from all other archosaurs, Colbert placed Poposaurus in its own family, Poposauridae. In the same paper, Colbert described an ilium from the Dockum Group of Howard County, Texas, which he assigned to P. gracilis.

In his 1977 study of Late Triassic saurischians, Peter Galton reclassified Poposaurus as a thecodont pseudosuchian. In 1915, Mehl described a "distal femur" in the holotype specimen of Poposaurus, but Galton interpreted this to be the fused end of the hip's pubis bones. Galton noted similarities between the hips of Poposaurus, Arizonasaurus, Bromsgroveia, Postosuchus, and Teratosaurus, and grouped them all in Poposauridae. Like paleontologists before him, Galton distinguished Poposaurus based on the unique shape of its ilium.

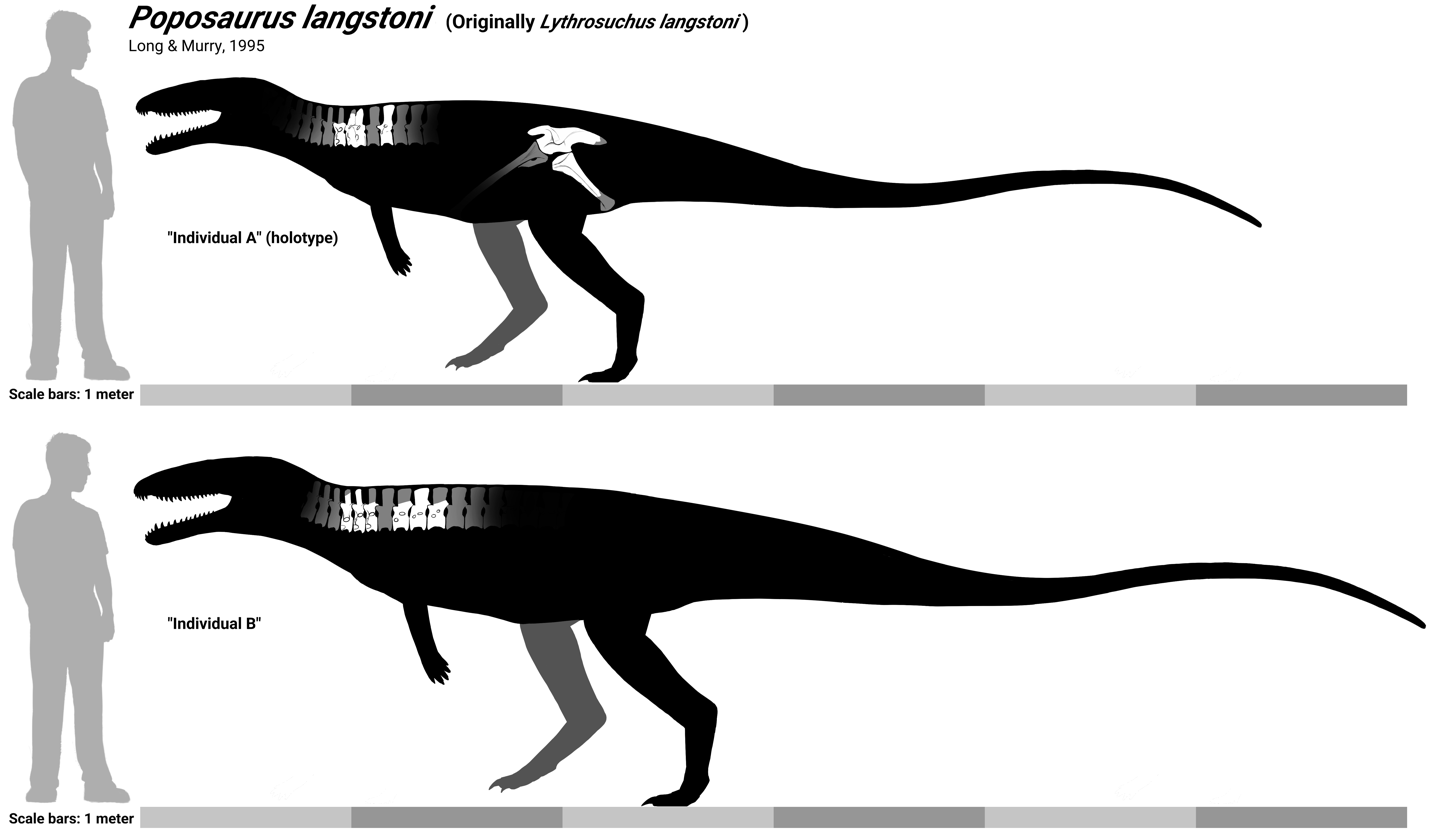
Known material of Poposaurus ("Lythrosuchus") langstoni

In 1995, paleontologists Robert Long and Phillip Murry described new fossils of Poposaurus from the Placerias quarry in the Chinle Formation of Arizona. Among the new material were parts of the lower limb, including the tibia and calcaneum. They removed Postosuchus from Poposauridae, claiming that the material used in this assignment was a chimera, or a collection of bones belonging to different animals. The pubis of Postosuchus was in fact a pubis of Poposaurus, leading to the mistaken classification. Long and Murry separated poposaurids like Poposaurus, Bromsgroveia, and the newly named Lythrosuchus from rauisuchians like Postosuchus, which they held in the family Rauisuchidae.

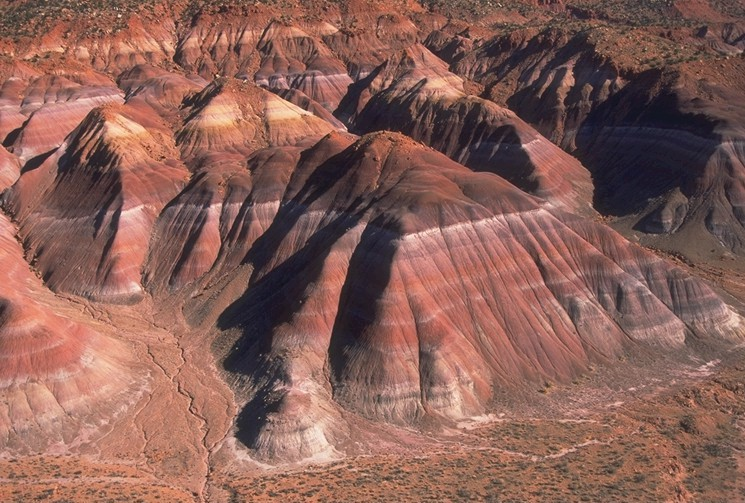
Fossils of Poposaurus gracilis have been found from the Chinle Formation in Grand Staircase–Escalante National Monument, Utah.

The known material of Poposaurus was again described in 2007, along with two new specimens from the Tecovas Formation of Texas and the Petrified Forest of Arizona. Long and Murry's Lythrosuchus langstoni was reclassified as a new species of Poposaurus, P. langstoni. P. langstoni differs from P. gracilis in that it is larger, it does not have a ridge of bone behind the hip socket, and does not have a pit on the ischium that fits into the ilium. In 2003, a nearly complete specimen of P. gracilis known as YPM VP 057100, and informally named "the Yale specimen", was found in the Chinle Formation of Grand Staircase–Escalante National Monument, Utah. It includes the forelimbs, hind limbs, hips, ribs, dorsal vertebrae, and all of the tail. Another specimen of Poposaurus from Arizona, PEFO 34865, includes not only postcranial remains but also cranial remains, confirming that Poposaurus was a hyper-carnivorous predator.

In 2022, the partial remains (fragmentary thoracic vertebrae and part a right humerus) of an immature P. gracilis were described from the early Carnian-aged Doswell Formation of Virginia, marking the first occurrence of this genus from eastern North America. This material was found at the same locality as Doswellia and was first mentioned in the 1980 paper describing it, where it was tentatively referred to as indeterminate rauisuchian remains.

== Description ==
With the tail comprising about half the body length, Poposaurus was about 4–5 metres (13–16 ft) long and weighed 90 to 100 kilograms (200 to 220 lb) as an adult. The body of Poposaurus is laterally compressed, with a long and narrow hip structure. The pubis and ischium are elongated. The end of the pubis forms a distinct hook that is unique to Poposaurus and a few other early pseudosuchians. Poposaurus has five sacral vertebrae connecting the spine to the hip, three more than most early archosaurs. The hind legs are about twice as long as the arms and placed close together. Five digits are present on the foot, but the fifth is reduced to a small splint of bone next to the metatarsals. The calcaneum bone extends far from the ankle to form a distinct heel.

== Classification ==
Poposaurus is a member of the family Poposauridae, part of the larger pseudosuchian group Poposauroidea. It is closely related to other Triassic pseudosuchians like ctenosauriscids and shuvosaurids. Like Poposaurus, shuvosaurids were bipedal. When the specimen YPM VP 057100 was described by Gauthier et al. in 2011, Poposaurus was included in a phylogenetic analysis. Poposaurus was placed within Poposauroidea as the sister taxon to the large-bodied herbivorous Lotosaurus and the shuvosaurids. This means that Poposaurus is more closely related to Lotosaurus and shuvosaurids than it is to any other pseudosuchian. The analysis found ctenosauriscids and the aquatic Qianosuchus to be successively more basal poposauroids. Below is the cladogram from Gauthier et al. (2011):

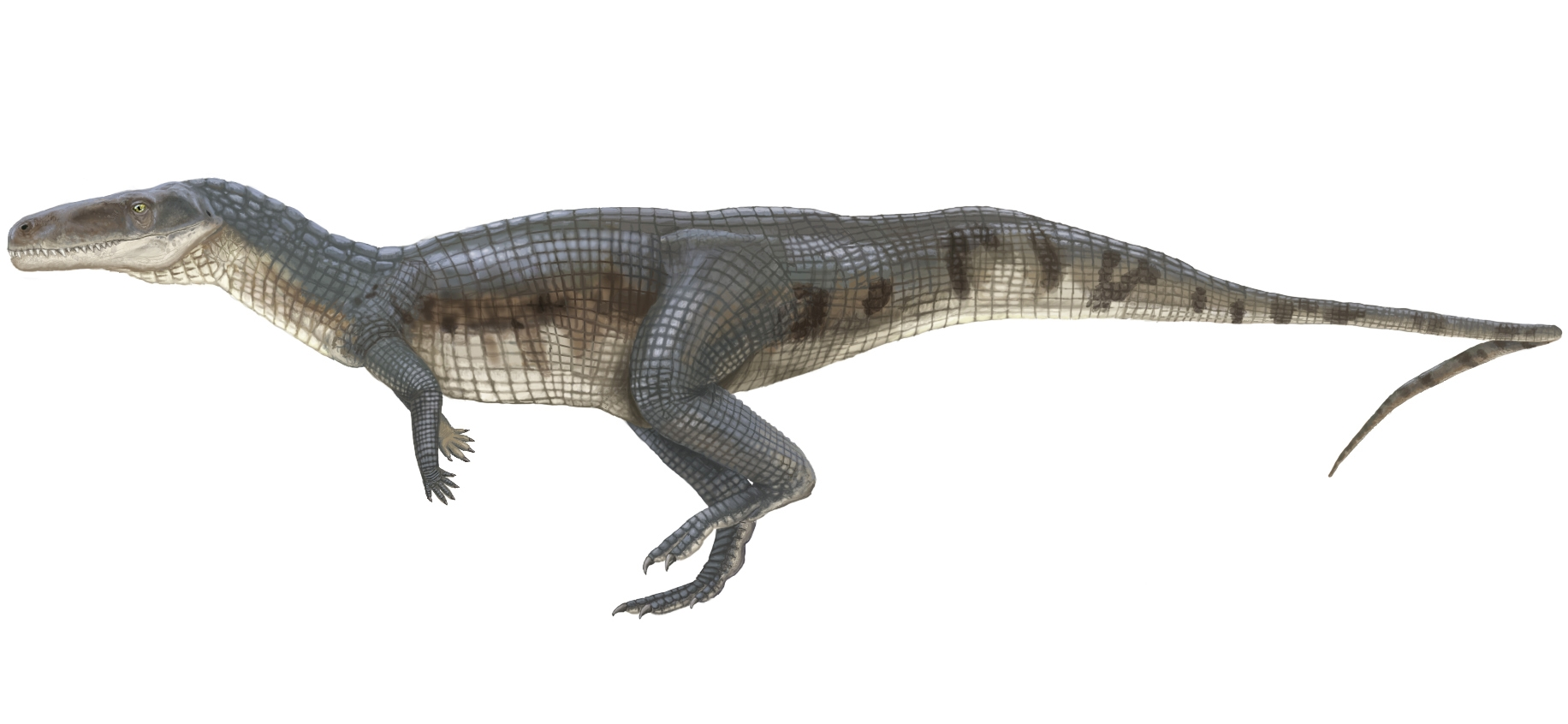
Life restoration of P. gracilis.

- Archosauria
  - Avemetatarsalia
  - Pseudosuchia
    - Ornithosuchidae
    - Suchia
      - Gracilisuchus
      - Turfanosuchus
      - - Revueltosaurus
        - Aetosauria
      - - Ticinosuchus
        - Paracrocodylomorpha
          - Poposauroidea
            - Qianosuchus
            - - - Arizonasaurus
                - Xilousuchus
              - - Poposaurus
                - - Lotosaurus
                  - - Sillosuchus
                    - - Shuvosaurus
                      - Effigia
          - - Prestosuchus
            - - Saurosuchus
              - - Batrachotomus
                - - Fasolasuchus
                  - - - Rauisuchus
                      - - Polonosuchus
                        - Postosuchus
                    - Crocodylomorpha

== Paleobiology ==
=== Locomotion ===
The hypothesized leg musculature of P. gracilis, with leg bones (top), superficial muscles (middle), and deep muscles (bottom).

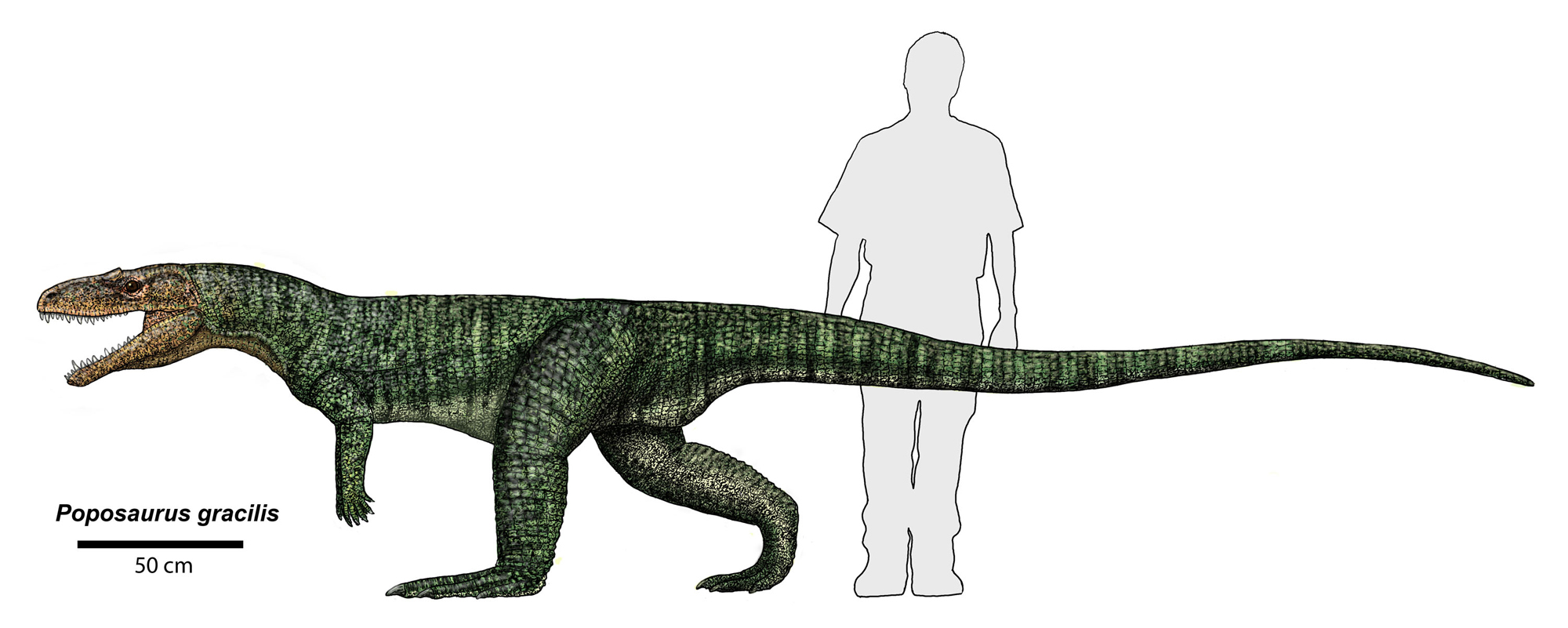
Life restoration of Poposaurus gracilis compared to a human

When M. G. Mehl first named Poposaurus in 1915, he described it as "a well-muscled creature light in weight, possibly bipedal in gait occasionally, and most assuredly swift in movement." Mehl based this description on its long limb bones and deep hip socket, two features which link it with bipedal dinosaurs. Since the 1970s however, Poposaurus has been considered a pseudosuchian archosaur more closely related to crocodilians than dinosaurs. Most of its close relatives (such as the large-bodied rauisuchids and ctenosauriscids) were obligate quadrupeds that could not walk on two legs. Although the entire skeleton was unknown, Poposaurus was expected to be similar in appearance to its relatives. In 2011, the nearly complete subadult specimen YPM VP 057100 was described. The specimen confirmed Mehl's description, revealing that Poposaurus was indeed bipedal. The skeleton preserves both the fore and hind limbs, showing that Poposaurus had much shorter arms than legs.

Although Poposaurus and early dinosaurs were both bipedal, the method of locomotion evolved independently in each group. The independent origins are shown through several differences in the skeletons of Poposaurus and dinosaurs. Unlike dinosaurs, Poposaurus has the characteristic crurotarsal ankle of pseudosuchians, usually associated with quadrupedal locomotion. Poposaurus also has a "pillar erect" stance in which the acetabulum or hip socket faces downward and is positioned directly over the head of the femur. In contrast, dinosaurs have "buttress erect" hip structures in which the acetabulum faces laterally and the head of the femur is angled to fit into it.

Although they evolved bipedal locomotion independently, Poposaurus and dinosaurs inherited a propensity for erect hind-limb driven movement from an early archosaur ancestor. The posture of this ancestral archosaur can be inferred from a method called extant phylogenetic bracketing. Archosauria is a crown group represented today by birds and crocodilians, meaning that the first archosaur was the last common ancestor of all birds and crocodilians. All birds have a fixed erect stance, and crocodilians have the ability to high walk with their limbs erect. If an erect stance is considered homologous in birds and crocodilians (most likely), phylogenetic bracketing implies that they inherited this trait from their common ancestor and that this ancestor also had an erect stance. With this reasoning, the first archosaurs are thought to have had the ability to high walk. Poposaurus and dinosaurs achieved a bipedal posture as their legs increased in size, their hips strengthened, and their spines adapted for dorsoventral flexion. Other adaptations that may have facilitated bipedal locomotion include the development of a chambered heart and lungs with unidirectional airflow (both of which are assumed present in Poposaurus through phylogenetic bracketing).

The leg musculature of Poposaurus was hypothesized in a 2011 study that examined muscle scars on the bones and made inferences based on phylogenetic bracketing. 26 muscles, three ligaments, and two connective tissue structures were described. While the hypothesized muscles of Poposaurus share many aspects with those of birds, they are more similar to those of crocodilians. Poposaurus is thought to have had a puboischiotibialis muscle, but this muscle is absent in birds and probably non-avian dinosaurs as well. The extensor digitorum brevis was probably present on the foot of Poposaurus, but not in birds. The puboischiofemoralis externus muscle of Poposaurus is also similar to those of living crocodilians. Other aspects of the muscles of Poposaurus differ from those of crocodilians. For example, the puboischiofemoralis internus muscle originates on the spine in crocodilians and on the hip in Poposaurus. The hip origin for this muscle is considered to be the original condition for archosaurs, since it is also seen in birds and non-avian dinosaurs. Poposaurus is thought to have had adductor muscles that were even larger than dinosaurs, as their insertion site runs along the entire length of the femur.

=== Breathing ===
The 2011 study of the leg musculature of Poposaurus also suggested a distinctive form of respiration that involved abdominal muscles. The study hypothesized that Poposaurus had an ischiotruncus muscle running from the ischium at the back of the hip, across the pubis, and into the gastralia bones of the abdomen. In a form of respiration called cuirassal breathing, the ischiotruncus would contract and compress the trunk, pumping the lungs.
