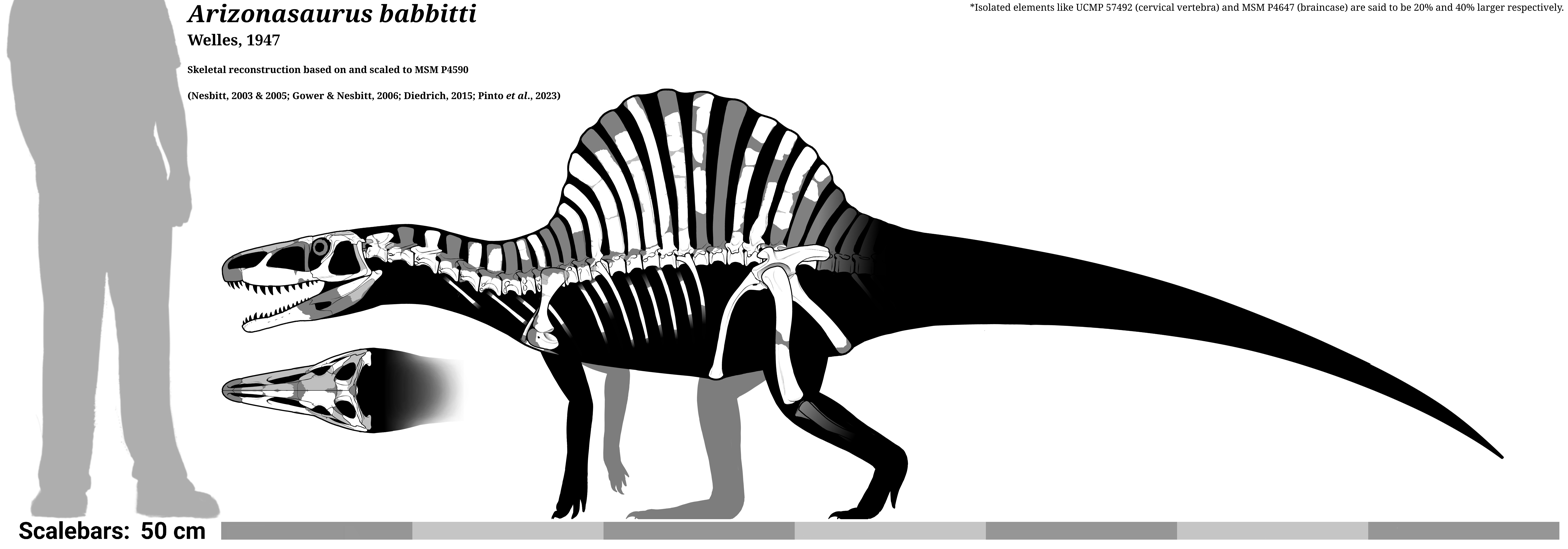
- Skeletal reconstruction and size comparison showcasing what is known of the most complete specimen
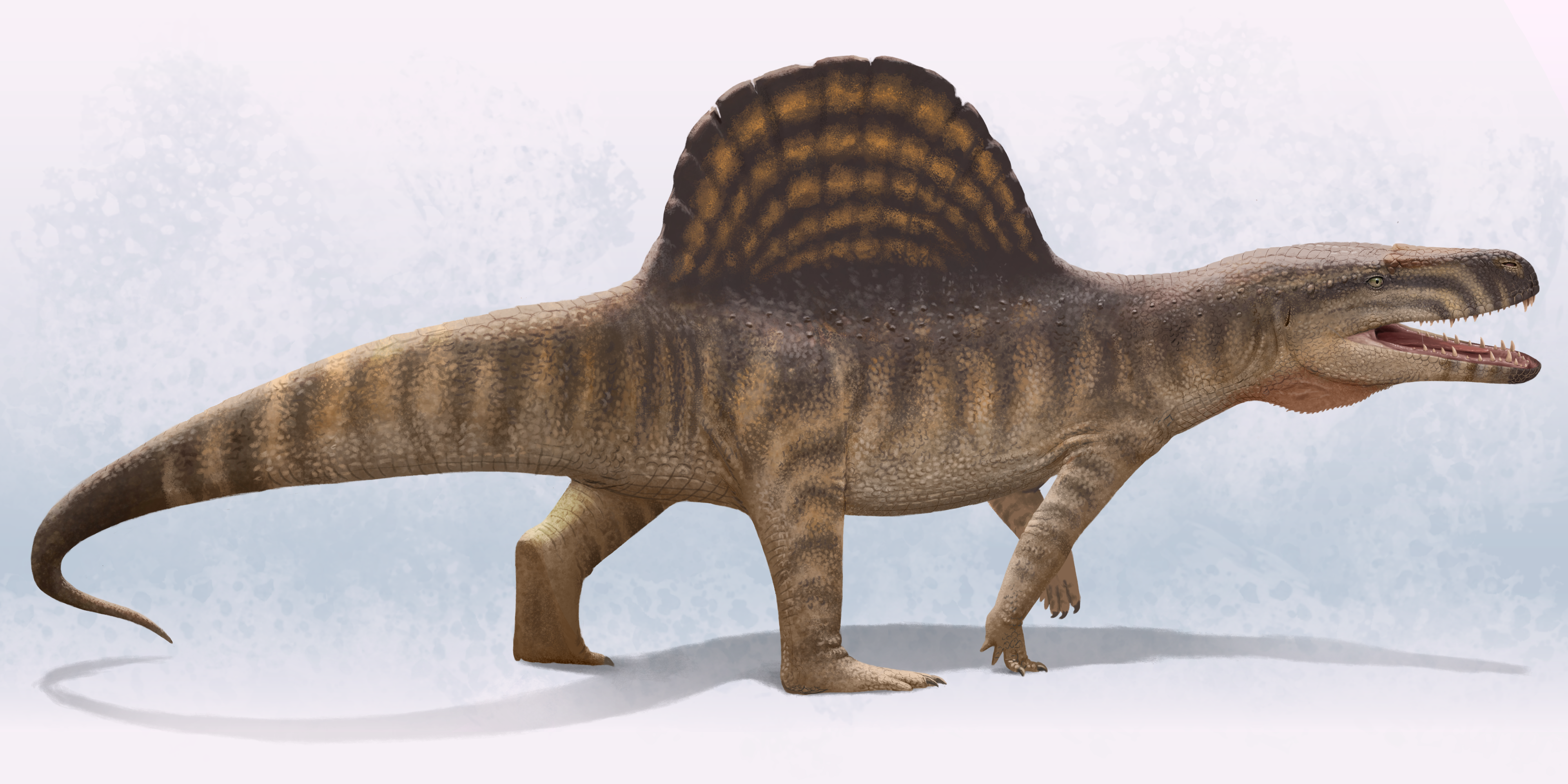
- Reconstruction of Arizonasaurus

Scientific classification
- Kingdom: Animalia
- Phylum: Chordata
- Class: Reptilia
- Clade: Pseudosuchia
- Clade: Paracrocodylomorpha
- Clade: †Poposauroidea
- Family: †Ctenosauriscidae
- Genus: †Arizonasaurus; Welles, 1947

Species
- †A. babbitti Welles, 1947 (type)

= Arizonasaurus =

Arizonasaurus Temporal range: Middle Triassic (Anisian), 243 Ma Possible Carnian record

Extinct genus of reptiles

Arizonasaurus (meaning "Arizona reptile") is a genus of ctenosauriscid archosaur from the Middle Triassic (243 million years ago) Moenkopi Formation of what is now Arizona. It is known for having a large back sail formed by elongated neural spines of its vertebrae. The type and only known species is A. babbitti, named and described in 1947.

== Discovery and naming ==
The type species, Arizonasaurus babbitti, was named by Samuel Paul Welles in 1947 on the basis of a few teeth and a maxilla, labelled as specimen UCMP 36232. A fairly complete skeleton (~50%) was found in 2002 by Sterling Nesbitt.

== Description ==
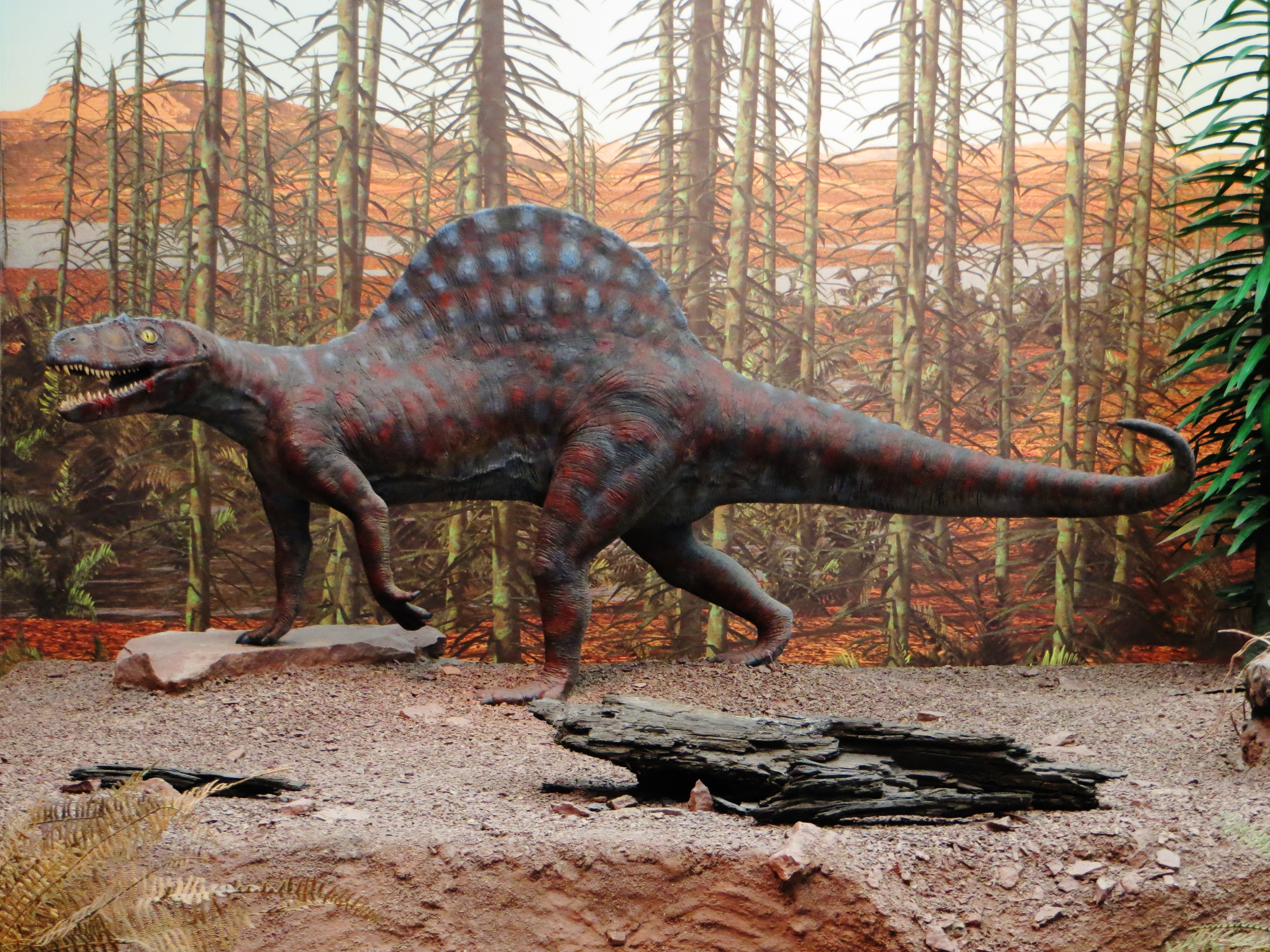
Model, Museum am Löwentor, Stuttgart

Arizonasaurus had a sail made of tall neural spines. This sail was similar to those of other basal archosaurs, such as other ctenosauriscids like Ctenosauriscus, Bromsgroveia, and Hypselorhachis.

Arizonasaurus is described from two braincase specimens. Some ancestral features of these braincases are plesiomorphic for crurotarsans.

Below is a list of characteristics found by Nesbitt in 2005 that distinguish Arizonasaurus:

- a deep fossa hidden from view on the posteroventral edge of the upward-pointing process of the maxilla;
- and a tongue-groove attachment between the pubis and the ilium.

== Classification ==
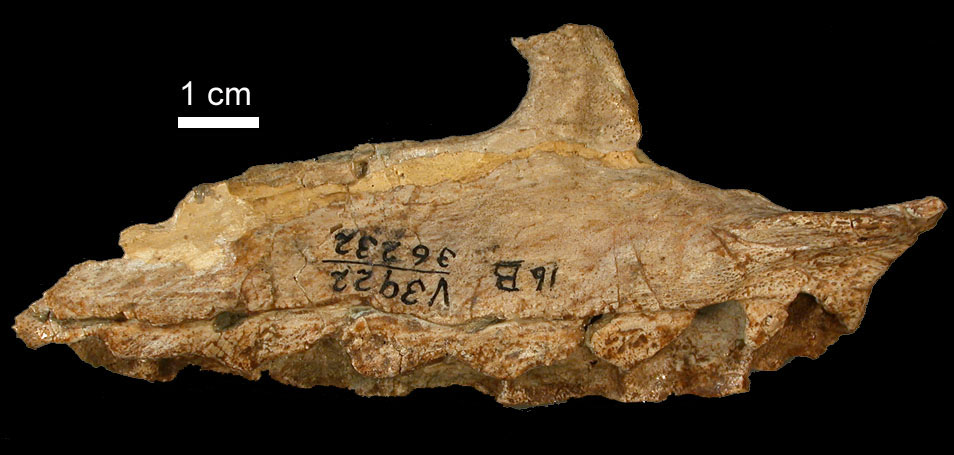
Holotye maxilla

Arizonasaurus was closely related to Ctenosauriscus; and, together with a few other genera, they make up Ctenosauriscidae. The ctenosauriscids were closely related to the poposaurids, as shown by a few shared derived characteristics. The pelvic girdle in Arizonasaurus unites this taxon with Ctenosauriscus, Lotosaurus, Bromsgroveia, and Hypselorhachis. Together, newly identified pseudosuchian features act as evidence that other poposauroids, such as Poposaurus, Sillosuchus, and Shuvosaurus, and ctenosauriscids form a monophyletic group that is more derived than rauisuchians.

Below is a phylogenetic cladogram simplified from Butler et al. in 2011 showing the cladistics of Archosauriformes, focusing mostly on Pseudosuchia:

- Poposauroidea
  - Qianosuchus
  - - Ctenosauriscidae
      - Arizonasaurus
      - Xilousuchus
      - Hypselorhachis
      - Ctenosauriscus
      - Bromsgroveia
      - Waldhaus Taxon
    - - - Poposaurus gracilis H
        - Poposaurus gracilis Y
      - - Lotosaurus
        - - Sillosuchus
          - - Shuvosaurus
            - Effigia

== Biogeography ==
Arizonasaurus is from the Middle Triassic Moenkopi Formation of northern Arizona. The presence of a poposauroid in the early Middle Triassic suggests that the divergence of birds and crocodiles occurred earlier than previously thought. Ctenosauriscids from the Middle Triassic allow the distribution of Triassic faunas to be more widespread, now in Europe, Asia, North America and Africa. The fauna of the Moenkopi Formation represents a stage transitional fauna between those of older and younger age.
