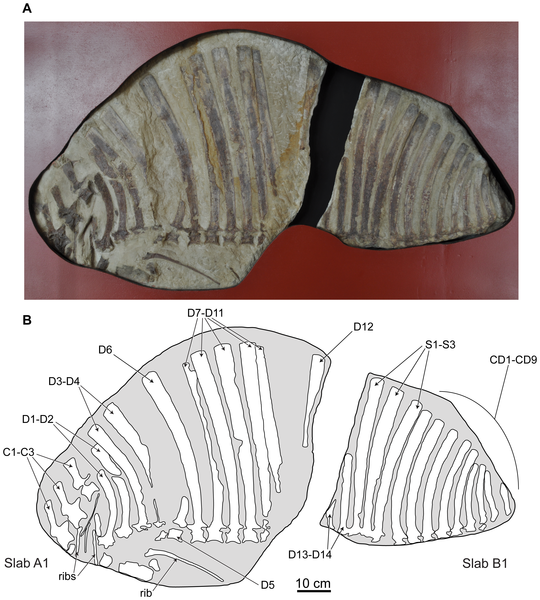
- Vertebrae of the ctenosauriscid Ctenosauriscus koeneni
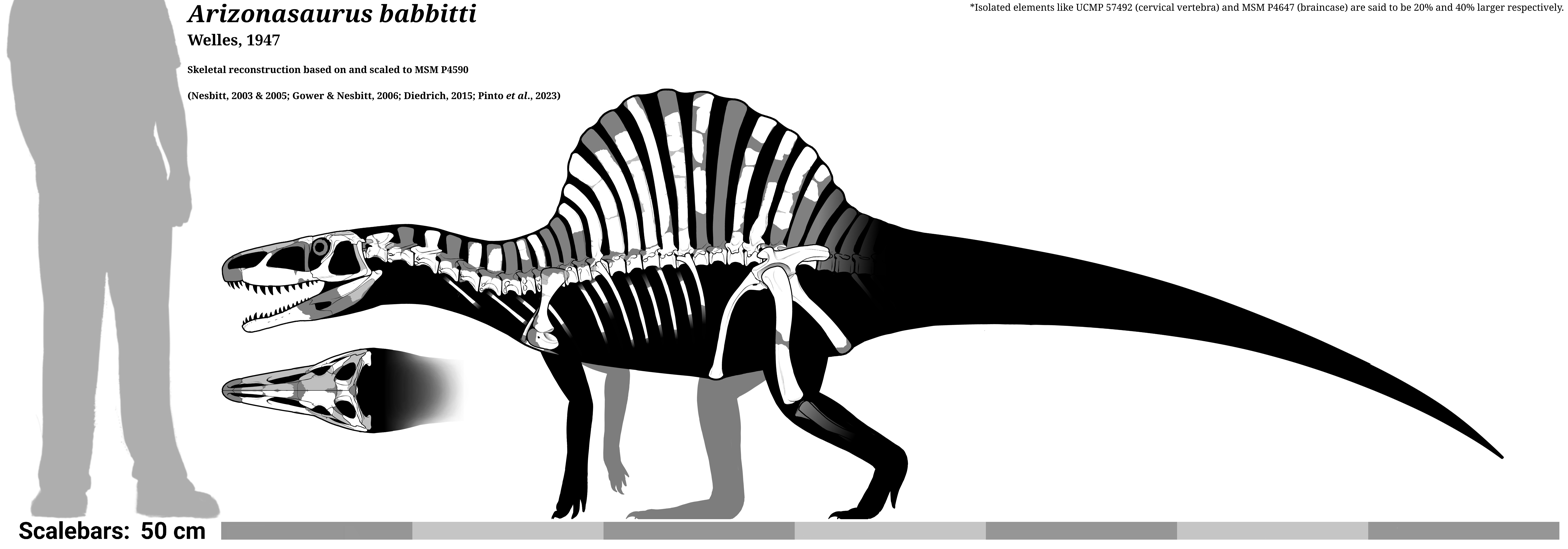
- Skeletal reconstruction of Arizonasaurus babbitti, the most completely known ctenosauriscid

Scientific classification
- Kingdom: Animalia
- Phylum: Chordata
- Class: Reptilia
- Clade: Pseudosuchia
- Clade: †Poposauroidea
- Family: †Ctenosauriscidae; Kuhn, 1964

Genera
- †Arizonasaurus; †Bromsgroveia; †Bystrowisuchus; †Ctenosauriscus; †Hypselorhachis; †Tsylmosuchus?; †Xilousuchus

= Ctenosauriscidae =

Ctenosauriscids Temporal range: Early-Middle Triassic, 247.5–237 Ma

Extinct family of reptiles

Ctenosauriscidae is an extinct family of pseudosuchian archosaurs within the clade Poposauroidea. Ctenosauriscids existed in Africa, Asia, Europe and North America during the Early Triassic to the Middle Triassic period (latest Olenekian to Anisian stages). All species had large "sails" on their backs. Ctenosauriscids are among some of the earliest archosaurs and represent the first global radiation of the group.

== Genera ==
Genus	Status	Age	Location	Unit	Notes	Images
Arizonasaurus	Valid	Anisian	USA	Moenkopi Formation		Arizonasaurus Xilousuchus Ctenosauriscus Some fossils of the "Waldhaus ctenosauriscid"
Bromsgroveia	Valid	Anisian	United Kingdom	Bromsgrove Sandstone Formation		Arizonasaurus Xilousuchus Ctenosauriscus Some fossils of the "Waldhaus ctenosauriscid"
Bystrowisuchus	Valid	Olenekian	Russia	Lipovskaya Formation		Arizonasaurus Xilousuchus Ctenosauriscus Some fossils of the "Waldhaus ctenosauriscid"
Ctenosauriscus	Valid	Olenekian	Germany	Solling Formation	Ctenosauriscus is one of the oldest archosaurs known to date.	Arizonasaurus Xilousuchus Ctenosauriscus Some fossils of the "Waldhaus ctenosauriscid"
Hypselorhachis	Valid	Anisian	Tanzania	Manda Formation		Arizonasaurus Xilousuchus Ctenosauriscus Some fossils of the "Waldhaus ctenosauriscid"
"Waldhaus" ctenosauriscid	Valid	Anisian	Germany	Röt Formation		Arizonasaurus Xilousuchus Ctenosauriscus Some fossils of the "Waldhaus ctenosauriscid"
Xilousuchus	Valid	Olenekian	China	Heshanggou Formation	Xilousuchus is one of the oldest archosaurs known to date.	Arizonasaurus Xilousuchus Ctenosauriscus Some fossils of the "Waldhaus ctenosauriscid"

== Phylogeny ==
Ctenosauriscidae was named by Oskar Kuhn in 1964 to include the genus Ctenosauriscus. It is a stem-based taxon defined by Richard J. Butler, Stephen L. Brusatte, Mike Reich, Sterling J. Nesbitt, Rainer R. Schoch and Jahn J. Hornung in 2011 as "the most inclusive clade containing Ctenosauriscus koeneni but not Poposaurus gracilis, Effigia okeeffeae, Postosuchus kirkpatricki, Crocodylus niloticus, Ornithosuchus longidens, or Aetosaurus ferratus". The cladograms below follows a 2011 analysis by Butler et al., the first based on Brusatte et al. 2010 and the second based on Nesbitt 2011.

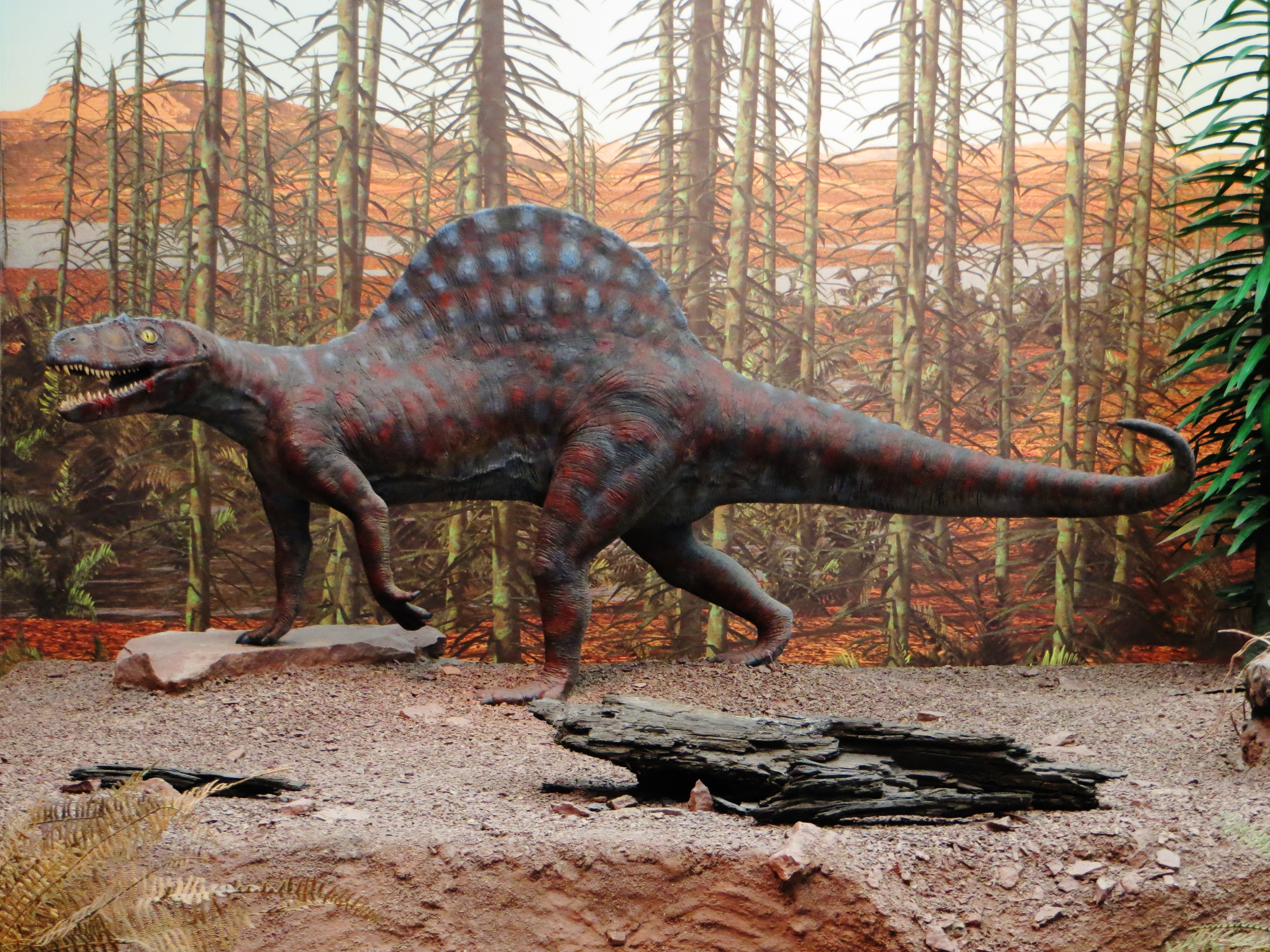
Arizonasaurus model, Museum am Lowentor, Stuttgart

- Poposauroidea
  - Lotosauridae
  - - Ctenosauriscidae
      - Arizonasaurus
      - Bromsgroveia
      - Ctenosauriscus
      - Hypselorhachis
      - Waldhaus ctenosauriscid
    - - Poposaurus
      - Sillosuchus
      - Shuvosauridae
        - Effigia
        - Shuvosaurus

- Poposauroidea
  - Qianosuchus
  - - Ctenosauriscidae
      - Arizonasaurus
      - Ctenosauriscus
      - Hypselorhachis
      - Waldhaus ctenosauriscid
      - Xilousuchus
    - - Poposauridae
        - Poposaurus
      - - Lotosauridae
          Lotosaurus
        - Shuvosauridae
          - Sillosuchus
          - - Effigia
            - Shuvosaurus
