= Bystrowisuchus =

Bystrowisuchus Temporal range: Early Triassic

Scientific classification
- Domain: Eukaryota
- Kingdom: Animalia
- Phylum: Chordata
- Class: Reptilia
- Clade: Archosauria
- Clade: Pseudosuchia
- Clade: †Poposauroidea
- Family: †Ctenosauriscidae
- Genus: †Bystrowisuchus; Sennikov, 2012

Type species
- †Bystrowisuchus flerovi Sennikov, 2012

Extinct genus of reptiles

Bystrowisuchus is an extinct genus of ctenosauriscid pseudosuchian archosaur from the Early Triassic of European Russia. Fossils have been found in the Olenekian-age Lipovskaya Formation in Ilovlinsky District. The type species is Bystrowisuchus flerovi.

== Description ==
Bystrowisuchus flerovi is based on a holotype specimen including six cervical or neck vertebrae and a partial right ilium or hip bone. Its total body length is estimated at 2 to 3 metres (6.6 to 9.8 ft).

== Discovery ==
The holotype specimen of Bystrowisuchus was found near the eastern banks of the Don River in Ilovlinsky District, Volgograd Oblast. It came from a fossil site known as the Donskaya Luka locality, which preserves a wide diversity of Early Triassic tetrapod fossils. Along with Bystrowisuchus, the Donskaya Luka fossil assemblage includes temnospondyl amphibians, a chroniosuchian, a procolophonid, a sauropterygian, a protorosaurian, possible trilophosaurid archosauromorphs, two rauisuchid archosaurs, and a dicynodont. Elongated neural spines previously attributed to the rauisuchid Scythosuchus basileus may belong instead to Bystrowisuchus.
