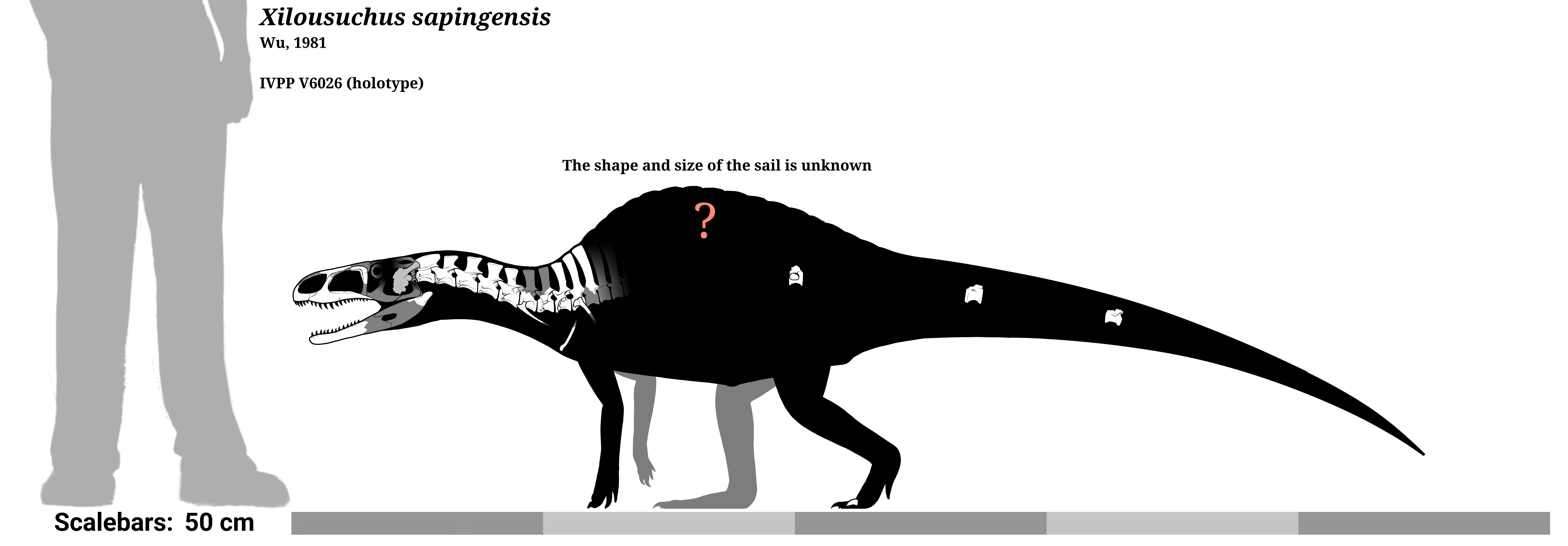
- Skeletal reconstruction showcasing known remains
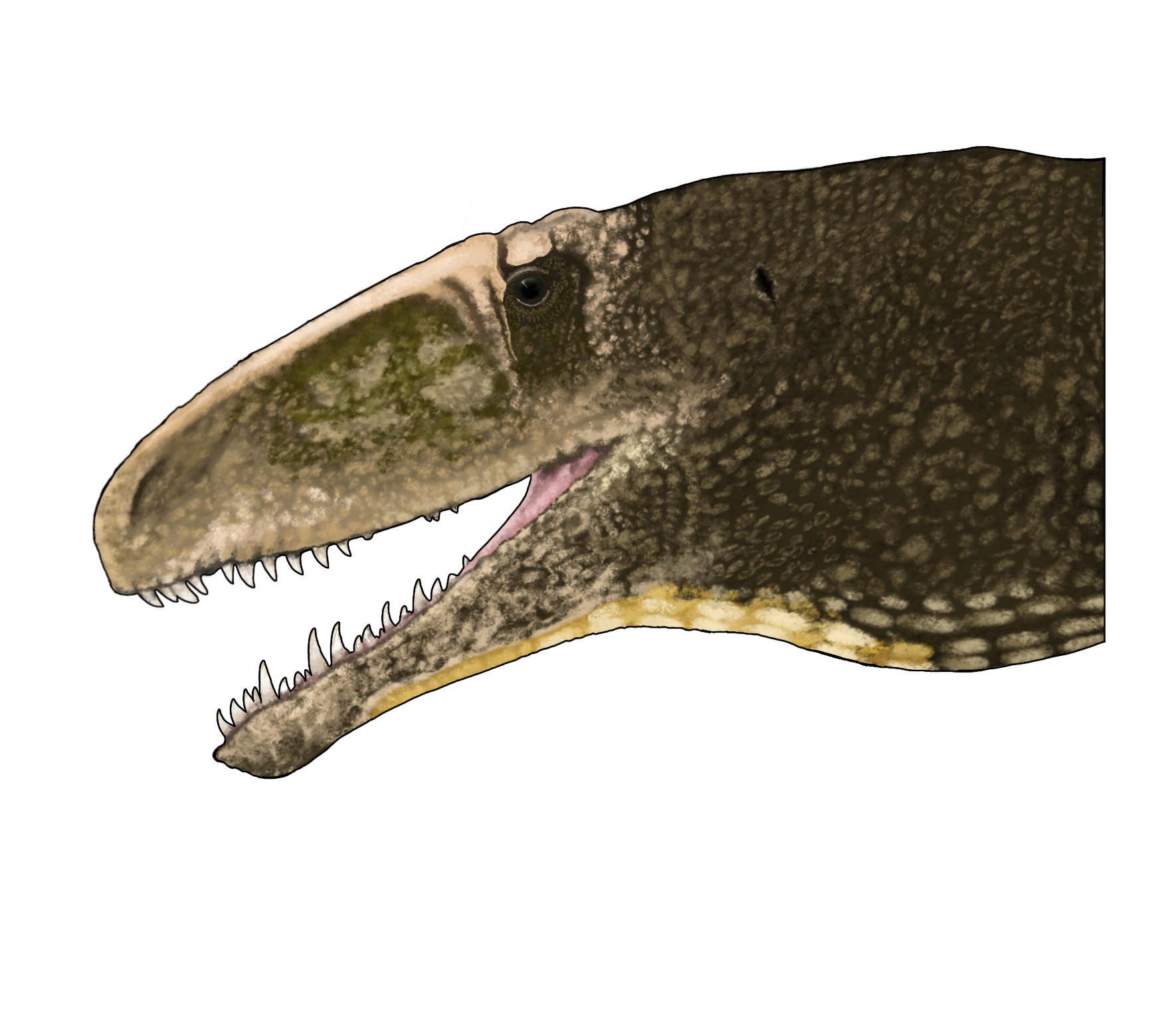
- Life reconstruction

Scientific classification
- Kingdom: Animalia
- Phylum: Chordata
- Class: Reptilia
- Clade: Pseudosuchia
- Clade: †Poposauroidea
- Family: †Ctenosauriscidae
- Genus: †Xilousuchus; Wu, 1981
- Species: †X. sapingensis

Binomial name
- †Xilousuchus sapingensis Wu, 1981

= Xilousuchus =

Xilousuchus Temporal range: Early Triassic, 247 Ma

Extinct genus of reptiles

Xilousuchus is an extinct genus of poposauroid from lower Triassic (Olenekian stage) deposits of Fugu County of northeastern Shanxi Province, China. Xilousuchus is one of the oldest archosaurs known to date.

== Discovery and naming ==
It is known from the holotype, IVPP V 6026, a single well-preserved partial skeleton including the skull. It was found from the Heshanggou Formation of the Ordos Basin, Hazhen commune. It was first named by Xiao-Chun Wu in 1981 and the type species is Xilousuchus sapingensis. Wu (1981) referred Xilousuchus to the Proterosuchia. Gower and Sennikov (1996) found it to be an erythrosuchian based strictly on the braincase. A more detailed re-description of the genus was provided by Nesbitt et al. (2010) and found poposauroid affinities. In his massive revision of archosaurs which included a large cladistic analysis, Sterling J. Nesbitt (2011) found Xilousuchus to be a poposauroid which is most closely related to Arizonasaurus. Xilousuchus is the oldest archosaur to date, although Ctenosauriscus and Vytshegdosuchus might be even older by less than one million years. Since Xilousuchus is a suchian archosaur, its early age suggests that most of the major groups of archosaurs (ornithodirans, ornithosuchids, aetosaurs, and paracrocodylomorphs) developed by the Early Triassic, soon after the appearance of the first archosaur.

== Features ==
Xilousuchus was probably quite a large animal when alive, possibly between three and four metres long. It had a small head, and a sail along its neck and back. It probably had long and quite powerful legs, and would have been an active hunter. Only the partial skull, cervical vertebrae, and a few other fragments are preserved.

Xilousuchus has a relatively small head and long neck, with a skull length of approximately 25 cm and neck of 45 cm. The skull is fragmentary, but much of the snout and maxilla are present. Only one maxillary tooth has been fossilised. The maxilla has a partially developed palatal process, and the angle of the dorsal process indicates that Xilousuchus had a large antorbital fenestra. The single preserved maxillary tooth is large, almost 15 mm long, and in other dental alveoli where the teeth are missing replacement teeth are sometimes visible, indicating that it was a polyphyodont. The tooth has small serrations, is curved backwards, and is laterally compressed, indicating that it could have punctured flesh or possibly sliced off chunks. The lacrimal and nasal bones are large but quite thin and fragile. The skull has a reasonably well-preserved braincase with thick walls and a small volume, and this shows that the brain was not large. It closely resembles that of Arizonasaurus, indicating that the two species are close relatives. The dentary bone is partially preserved for both left and right, and would have held thirteen teeth on each side, although only the nutrient foramina remain. Like that of most archosaurs from the Triassic, the dentary is unspecialised.

The cervical vertebrae have large, flattened neural spines which make up most of their height and would have formed a sail-like structure in life, similar to other ctenosauriscids. Unusually, however, they curve slightly forwards. There is little space between the neural spines, indicating that Xilousuchus would probably not have had a very flexible neck. The spines gradually increase in height as they move backwards - that on the axis vertebra is 42 mm high, whereas that on the tenth cervical vertebra is 92 mm high. The height of the sail along the back is not known, as none of the dorsal vertebrae have been preserved, but it was probably similar to that in Arizonasaurus or Hypselorhachis.

One sacral vertebra is present, and it shows a clear suture where it was joined to the sacral ribs and pelvis. The orientation of the sacral rib suggests that the ilium was downturned, although this is not certain. Two caudal vertebrae are present as well, and these are poorly preserved with missing neural spines, but show facets where chevrons would have been attached. The proximal ends of two cervical ribs have also been fossilised, and these have two heads - a tuberculum and capitulum. They are slender, unlike those of phytosaurs and crocodylomorphs. One clavicle and one ungual are also known, but it is not known where the ungual is from. They have few distinguishing features and resemble those of other ctenosauriscids very closely.

== Phylogeny ==
Cladogram after Nesbitt, 2010:

- Poposauroidea
  - Qianosuchus
  - - Ctenosauriscidae
      - Arizonasaurus
      - Xilousuchus
    - - Poposauridae
        - Poposaurus
      - - Lotosaurus
        - Shuvosauridae
          - Sillosuchus
          - - Effigia
            - Shuvosaurus
