= Solling Formation =

Geologic formation in Germany

- Stratigraphic range: Olenekian-Anisian (Spathian-Aegean); ~251.3–242 Ma
- Type: Formation
- Unit of: Buntsandstein Group
- Sub-units: Solling-Bausandstein & Chirotherium Sandstone Members

Lithology
- Primary: Claystone
- Other: Siltstone

Location
- Coordinates: 50.3°N 11.0°E
- Approximate paleocoordinates: 16.2°N 19.7°E
- Region: Bavaria, Niedersachsen, Sachsen-Anhalt, Thuringia
- Country: Germany
- Solling Formation (Germany)

The Solling Formation is a geologic formation in Germany. Formerly considered earliest Triassic (Induan), but later dating places the formation from the Olenekian to Anisian of the Triassic period.

== Description ==
The formation is subdivided into three members, the lower Solling-Bausandstein Member, the Trendelburg/Karlshafen Beds and the upper Chirotherium Sandstone Member.

== Fossil content ==
The following fossils have been reported from the formation:

=== Temnospondyls ===
- Parotosuchus nasutus
- Trematosaurus brauni

=== Reptiles ===
- Anomoiodon liliensterni
- Ctenosauriscus koeneni
- Koiloskiosaurus coburgiensis
- Trachelosaurus fischeri

=== Flora ===
- Pleuromeia sternbergii

== See also ==
- List of fossiliferous stratigraphic units in Germany
