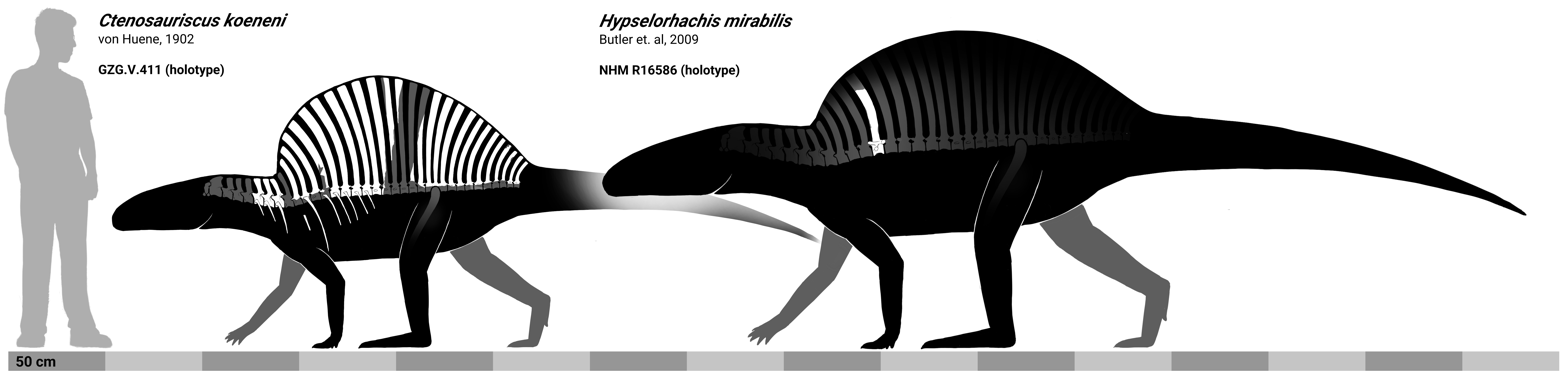
- Skeletal reconstruction and hypothetical size comparison of Ctenosauriscus (left) and Hypselorhachis (right). Known remains shown in white
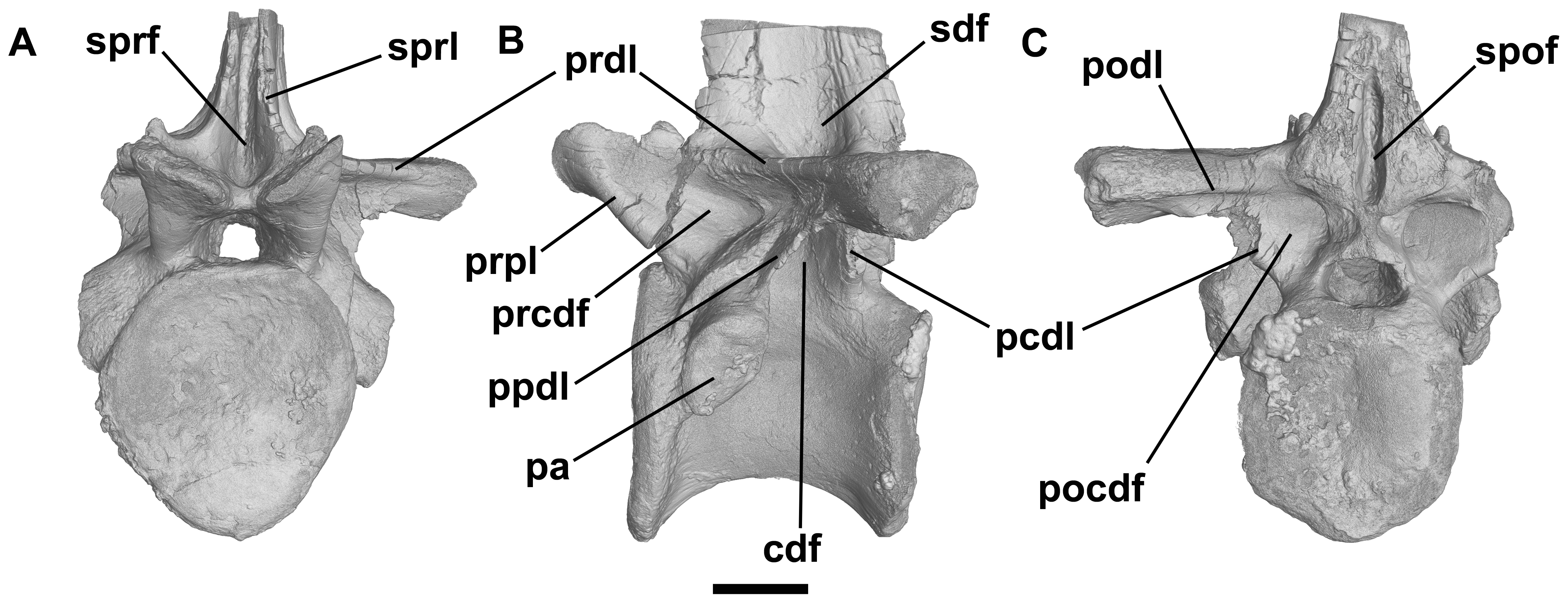
- Close-up of the holotype

Scientific classification
- Kingdom: Animalia
- Phylum: Chordata
- Class: Reptilia
- Clade: Archosauria
- Clade: Pseudosuchia
- Clade: Paracrocodylomorpha
- Clade: †Poposauroidea
- Family: †Ctenosauriscidae
- Genus: †Hypselorhachis; Butler et al., 2009

Species
- †H. mirabilis Butler et al., 2009 (type)

= Hypselorhachis =

Hypselorhachis Temporal range: Middle Triassic

Extinct genus of reptiles

Hypselorhachis is a genus of extinct reptile, possibly a ctenosauriscid archosaur related to Ctenosauriscus. It lived during the Triassic Period. It is currently known only from a single vertebra found from the Middle Triassic Manda Beds in Tanzania. The vertebra is preserved in reasonably good condition, as although the tall neural spine is chipped in several places it is not broken despite being quite slender, only around 20 mm thick transversely.

The type species is H. mirabilis, mentioned but never fully described by English paleontologist Alan J. Charig. Hypselorhachis was assigned to the Ctenosauriscidae, a group of sail-backed archosaurs, in 1988. It was formally described by Richard J. Butler and co-workers in 2009. The name means 'wonderful high spine', from the Latin 'mirabilis' 'wonderful' and the Greek 'ὑπσελος', 'high' and 'ῥαχις' 'spine' or 'backbone'. Hypselorhachis was probably at least 3 metres long, maybe up to 4 or 5 metres, as the vertebra is certainly from quite a large animal.

Hypselorhachis is known from a single anterior dorsal vertebra found from the Lifua Member of the Manda Beds, which is thought to have been deposited during the Anisian stage. The only characteristic that diagnoses the genus is a feature seen in the prezygapophysis - a small part of the bone projects dorsally. Because of the lack of any other material, comparisons between it and other early archosaurs can only be based on features seen in the vertebra, making any current phylogenetic classification tentative. Because the neural spine of the holotype is elongate, being over five times the height of the centrum, Hypselorhachis may be a ctenosauriscid. The neural spine is around 305 mm high, or possibly greater than this as some of the end may be missing, while the centrum is only around 60 mm high even at its tallest points. As is visible on the picture, the centrum has deeply concave lower, left and right surfaces. Other ctenosauriscids such as Arizonasaurus and Ctenosauriscus possessed characteristically large sails that were formed from elongate neural spines, and the shape of the neural spine is also similar. In Hypselorhachis, as in the ctenosauriscids mentioned, the neural spine is wider at the distal end than at the proximal end, and if, as seems certain, it did have a full sail the sail would have been quite tough due to mostly being transversely compressed bone with little space in between. The neural arch is very solid and quite compact, and the neural canal rather thin, so the spinal cord would have been relatively well protected.

Other features of the vertebra include multiple fossae or pits around the neural canal, especially just above it on the posterior side of the vertebra. These were present in many archosaurs and archosauromorphs, such as saurischian dinosaurs, pterosaurs, Erythrosuchus, Postosuchus and Arizonasaurus. The fact that Hypselorhachis shares them with Arizonasaurus may also be further evidence of its being closely related - although on their own they were so common that they would not suggest this, the presence of both the deep fossae and the high neural spine resembling that of Arizonasaurus is strong evidence to suggest that Hypselorhachis was indeed a ctenosauriscid, or at least a relative of the main ctenosauriscid group.
