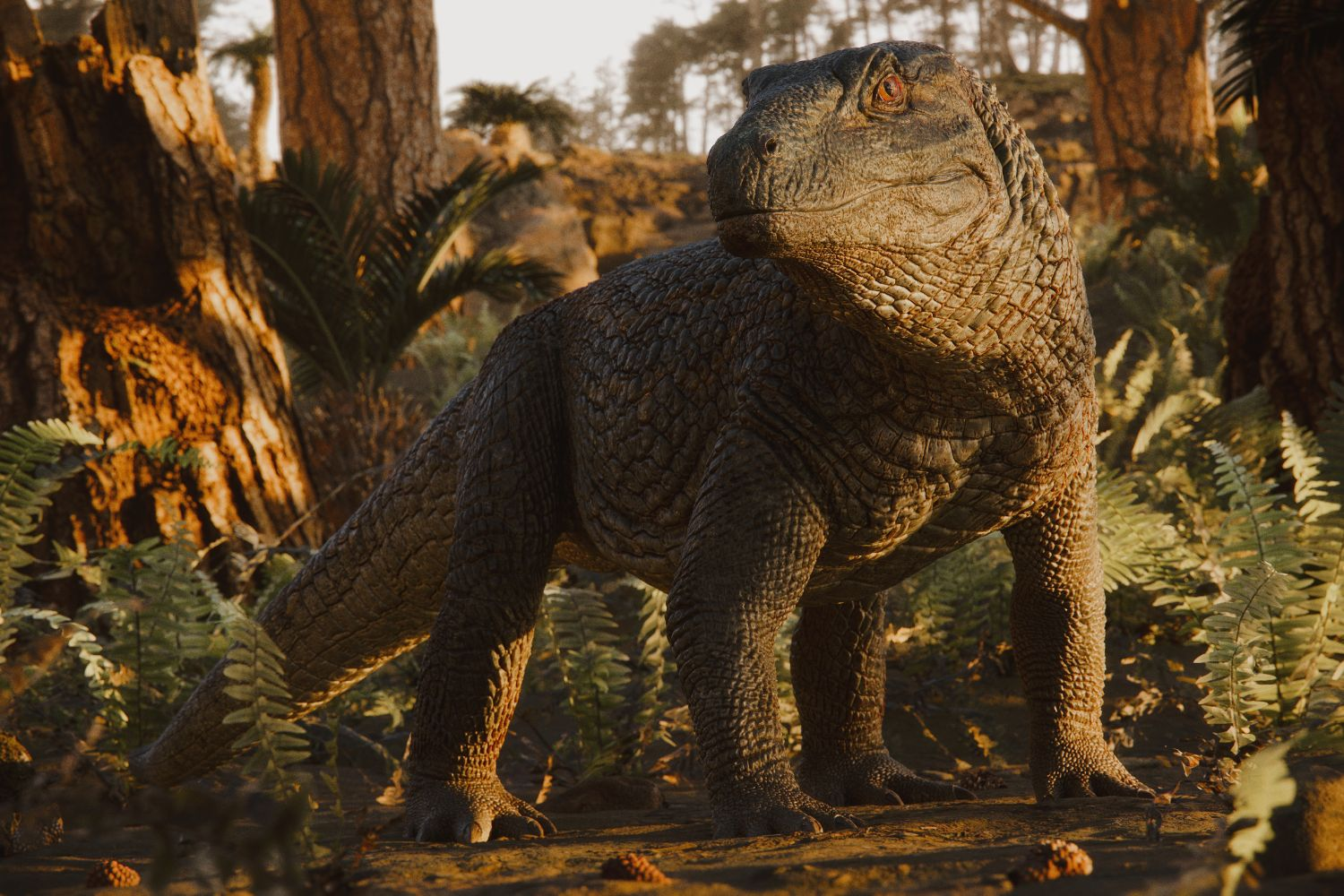
- Speculative life restoration
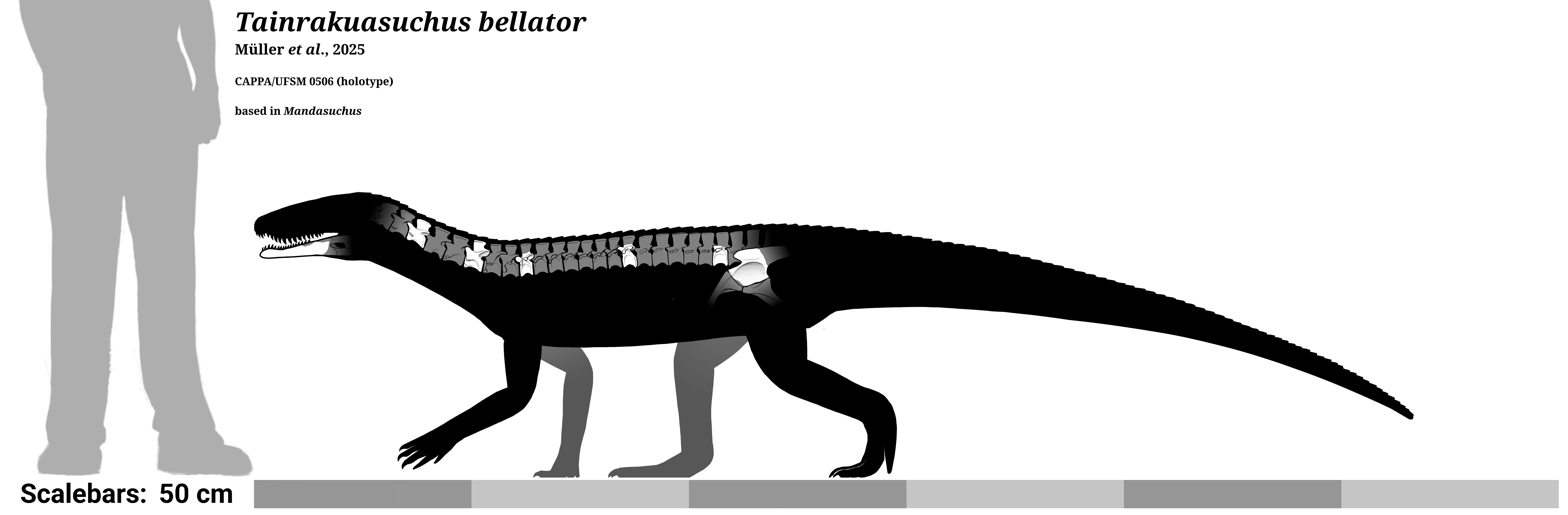
- Skeletal reconstruction and size comparison showcasing known elements

Scientific classification
- Kingdom: Animalia
- Phylum: Chordata
- Class: Reptilia
- Clade: Pseudosuchia
- Clade: †Poposauroidea
- Genus: †Tainrakuasuchus; Müller et al., 2025
- Species: †T. bellator

Binomial name
- †Tainrakuasuchus bellator Müller et al., 2025

= Tainrakuasuchus =

Tainrakuasuchus Temporal range: Middle Triassic, Ladinian

Genus of poposauroid pseudosuchians

Tainrakuasuchus is an extinct genus of poposauroid pseudosuchians known from the Middle Triassic Dinodontosaurus Assemblage Zone, part of the Santa Maria Supersequence of Brazil. The genus contains a single species, Tainrakuasuchus bellator, known from part of the lower jaw, five vertebrae, and a partial pelvic girdle.

== Discovery and naming ==
Tainrakuasuchus type locality in Dona Francisca, Brazil

In May 2025, Rodrigo T. Müller and a group of paleontologists from the Federal University of Santa Maria (UFSM) visited fossiliferous outcrops of the Pinheiros-Chiniquá Sequence of the Santa Maria Supersequence in Dona Francisca, Rio Grande do Sul, Brazil. These layers are referable to the Dinodontosaurus Assemblage Zone. At 'sector c' of the 'Posto site' (separated from sectors 'a' and 'b' by vegetation), the team discovered and collected a partial pseudosuchian skeleton. It was subsequently prepared and accessioned in the collections of the Centro de Apoio à Pesquisa Paleontológica da Quarta Colônia at the UFSM as specimen CAPPA/UFSM 0506. The specimen comprises the disarticulated remains of a single individual, including part of the left lower jaw (dentary, splenial, and four partial teeth), two cervical (neck) vertebrae, three dorsal (back) vertebrae, and the right ilium.

In 2025, Müller and colleagues described Tainrakuasuchus bellator as a new genus and species of poposauroid pseudosuchian based on these fossil remains, establishing CAPPA/UFSM 0506 as the holotype (name-bearing) specimen. The generic name, Tainrakuasuchus, combines the Guarani words tain, meaning 'tooth', rakua, meaning 'pointed', with the Greek word soûkhos (suchus), derived from the Greek name of Sobek, the crocodile-headed deity of Ancient Egyptian myth. This is intended to morphology of the teeth of the lower jaw. The specific name, bellator, is a Latin word meaning 'warrior' or 'fighter', honoring the people of Rio Grande do Sul near the type locality and their endurance and resilience during severe flooding in the region happening near the time of the discovery of the holotype.

== Description ==
As a poposauroid, Tainrakuasuchus was likely a quadrupedal active predator with a long neck, slender jaws, and recurved, sharp teeth. The holotype has been estimated to belong to an animal around 2.4 metres (7.9 ft) long and 60 kilograms (130 lb) in weight.

=== Lower jaw ===
The dentary bone of Tainrakuasuchus is described as slender, with a height to length ratio of 0.1, which resembles the closely related Mandasuchus from Africa while setting it apart from the tall dentaries seen in the ornithosuchid Dynamosuchus. The lateral face of the dentary prominently features a groove that begins about two-thirds down the bone's length and runs just below the toothrow until the elevated posterodorsal process. Similar structures have been identified in other early poposauroids, namely Mambawakale, while a series of foramina occupies the same position in Mandasuchus. Towards the back of the element, the dentary forms a posterodorsal process that rises above the toothrow and is split into a distinct upper and lower surface by a notch. The dentary is the only bone to participate in forming the mandibular symphysis, the part of the mandible where the two halves are sutured to each other, excluding the splenial as in most other poposauroids. The symphysis itself is short and only occupies the front-most part of the dentary, which contrasts with Mambawakale and ornithosuchids, which have a more substantially elongated symphysis.

In contrast to the lateral surface of the dentary, the medial face of the splenial is generally described as plain, lacking foramina or grooves. The splenial begins anteriorly as a slender bone, but grows taller further back in the lower jaw. Like the dentary, the splenial forms a posterodorsal and ventrolateral process, the latter of which extends further back than the former. Here, the splenial does bear a ridge and accompanying groove.

While only four actual teeth are preserved in the holotype specimen of Tainrakuasuchus, the dentary bone bears 17 dental alveoli, a count that is comparable to Mambawakale. Some more derived poposauroids bear fewer teeth or lost them altogether in the case of shuvosaurids. The preserved teeth show a blade-like morphology, being lateromedially compressed and recurved. While the teeth bear some features indicative of ziphodonty, the actual presence of serrations that define this tooth morphology cannot be determined due to the holotype's poor preservation.

=== Vertebrae ===
The anteriormost (toward the front) known neck vertebra of Tainrakuasuchus is amphicoelous (concave on both sides of the centrum), parallelogram-shaped and notably longer than the mid-dorsal vertebrae, with the latter being a feature shared by other poposauroids and avemetatarsalians. In contrast, some other pseudosuchians like the contemporary Prestosuchus have neck vertebrae shorter than the mid-dorsals. The neural spine is also elongated, stretching almost the entire anteroposterior length of the neural arch. The neural spine is roughly fan-shaped, expanding both in width and length along its height. A similar neural spine shape can be found across poposauroids, having been observed in both basal forms like Mandasuchus and Schultzsuchus as well as members of Ctenosauriscidae. Tainrakuasuchus resembles Schultzsuchus in preserving both epipophyses and postzygapophyses, with the former being a rarity among pseudosuchians. While this sets both of them apart from the larger Prestosuchus, the two differ in the details of this morphology. In Schultzsuchus the two structures are separated by a prominent gap, while in Tainrakuasuchus the two are only weakly separated.

The known mid-cervical vertebra is also elongated relative to dorsal vertebrae, though not as long as its predecessors. The centrum of these vertebrae further differs as it is not parallelogram- but spool-shaped, bearing a strong constriction at the midpoint. The neural canal is rectangular on the front face of the vertebrae with narrowing walls, resulting in the posterior opening being triangular in shape. Notably, the canal bears a notch in its dorsolateral corner, situated between the walls of the arch and the medial ridge, which gives the dorsal margin of the canal the appearance of an M when seen from the front. The neural spine that sits atop the arch is shorter in anteroposterior length than that of the predecessor, but retains the fan-shaped morphology caused by the lengthening and thickening with height. Looking at the vertebra from above shows that the neural spine is thicker towards the front and narrower towards the back. The postzygapophyses of this neck vertebra are notably connected to each other by an intrapostzygapophyseal lamina at their base, which helps distinguish it from Schultzsuchus in which such a lamina is missing. Like in the previous vertebra, the epipophyses remain only poorly separated from the postzygapophyses.

== Classification ==
In their 2025 phylogenetic analysis, Müller and colleagues recovered Tainrakuasuchus as a member of the paracrocodylomorph clade Poposauroidea, as the sister taxon to Mandasuchus, known from rocks of approximately the same age in Tanzania. These results are displayed in the cladogram below:

- Paracrocodylomorpha
  - Loricata
  - Poposauroidea
    - Mambawakale ruhuhu
    - - Benggwigwishingasuchus eremicarminis
      - - - Mandasuchus tanyauchen
          - Tainrakuasuchus bellator
        - - Schultzsuchus loricatus
          - - Xilousuchus sapingensis
            - Arizonasaurus babbitti
            - Qianosuchus mixtus
            - - Poposaurus gracilis
              - - Lotosaurus adentus
                - - Sillosuchus longicervix
                  - - Shuvosaurus inexpectatus
                    - Effigia okeeffeae

== Paleobiology ==
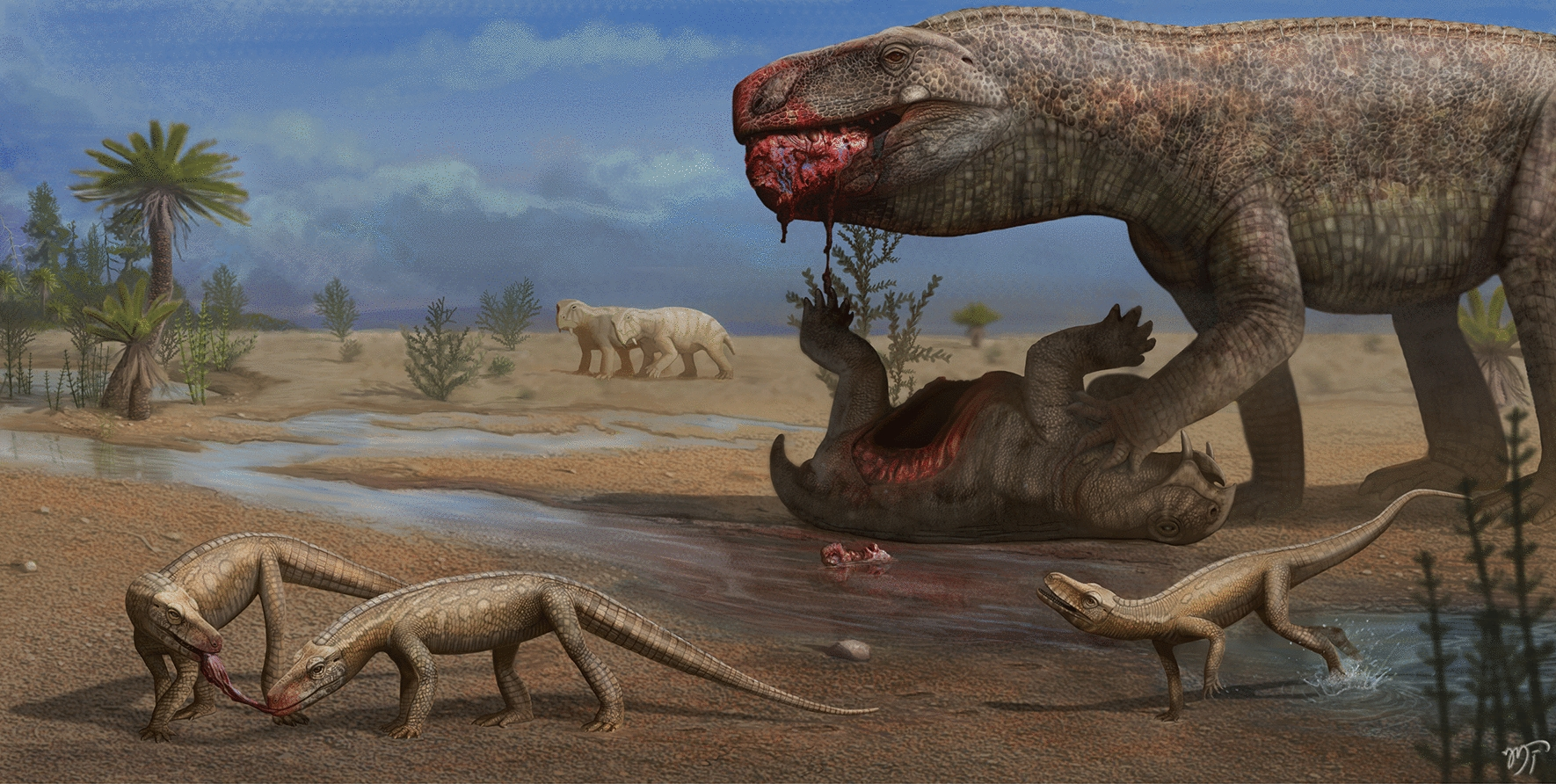
Prestosuchus and Parvosuchus, the largest and smallest pseudosuchians of the Dinodontosaurus AZ

The sediments of the Dinodontosaurus Assemblage Zone are known to preserve a taxonomically and ecologically diverse pseudosuchian fauna with between six and eight recognized species. The smallest among them was Parvosuchus, which, with a length of only around 1 m (3 ft 3 in), was likely restricted to preying on small animals. Prestosuchus, likely the apex predator of the fauna and the largest of the pseudosuchians in that region. With a range between 2–4 m (6 ft 7 in – 13 ft 1 in) erpetosuchids like Archeopelta and Pagosvenator and poposauroids like Schultzsuchus and Tainrakuasuchus represent medium-sized predators. Despite their similar size to erpetosuchids, early poposauroids like Tainrakuasuchus would have likely been distinct in their ecology due to differences in their skulls and dentition. Basal poposauroids possess teeth throughout the maxilla, whereas the teeth of the upper jaw are concentrated closer to the tip in erpetosuchids, suggesting that these animals captured prey differently or fed on different prey.

While the holotype of Tainrakuasuchus suggests a moderate size of up to 3 m (9.8 ft), isolated remains from the Posto locality could indicate the presence of even larger individuals. However, even at a greater size, Tainrakuasuchus would have been ecologically distinct from the other large predator of the fauna, as poposauroid neck vertebrae are longer and shallower and therefore not built to deal with the same stresses as those likely dealt with by rauisuchians such as Prestosuchus.
