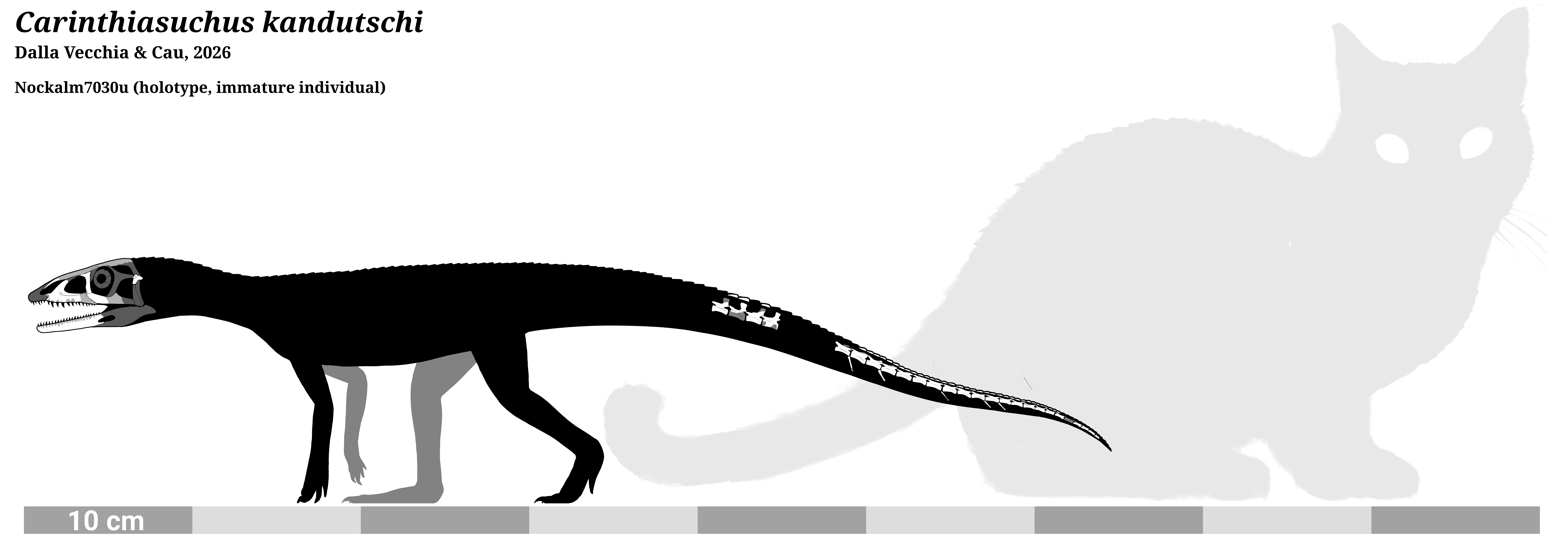
- Skeletal reconstruction of the holotype

Scientific classification
- Kingdom: Animalia
- Phylum: Chordata
- Class: Reptilia
- Clade: Pseudosuchia
- Clade: †Poposauroidea
- Genus: †Carinthiasuchus; Dalla Vecchia & Cau, 2026
- Species: †C. kandutschi

Binomial name
- †Carinthiasuchus kandutschi Dalla Vecchia & Cau, 2026

= Carinthiasuchus =

Carinthiasuchus Temporal range: Middle - Late Triassic, Ladinian–Carnian
- Holotype

Genus of reptile

Carinthiasuchus is an extinct genus of poposauroid pseudosuchian from the Ladinian to Early Carnian Partnach Formation of Carinthia, Austria.

== History and naming ==
C. kandutschi type locality

Carinthiasuchus kandutschi is known from a single specimen, holotype Nockalm 7030u, a slab of limestone containing parts of the skull, a collection of caudal vertebrae, and a more distal part of the tail still preserved in articulation. The specimen was discovered by Georg Kandutsch near the village of Jadersdorf in the Gailtal Alps of Carinthia in southern Austria. The locality, which is located at the southern flank of Mt. Großboden and corresponds to the Ladinian to early Carnian Partnach Formation.

The name Carinthiasasurus is derived from the Latin name for the region, which is known as Kärnten in German, and the Greek soúkhos (σούχος), which roughly translates to crocodile. The specific name meanwhile was chosen in honor of the animal's discoverer, Georg Kandutsch.

== Description ==
Holotype skull

The holotype skull of C. kandutschi is notably smaller than in other early European pseudosuchians. The preserved portion measures approximately 53 mm (2.1 in), which Dalla Vecchia and Cau use as the basis for an estimated total length of perhaps up to 65 mm (2.6 in) when considering the fact that the premaxilla was rather short. While some of the vertebrae in the distal tail region are already fused, other more proximal vertebrae, the skull bones, and the mandibular symphysis are not, indicating that the individual was not yet fully mature. This means that though small compared to animals like Ticinosuchus and Batrachotomus with skull lengths of 260 mm (10 in) and up to 500 mm (20 in) respectively, an adult individual would have still been somewhat larger than what is indicated by the type specimen.

While derived poposauroids like shuvosaurids and ctenosauriscids are known to have lost the osteoderm armor that pseudosuchians are generally known for, Carinthiasuchus still preserves a distinct series of bony plates running down its tail. Osteoderms are similarly present in other basal poposauroids like Schultzsuchus, Mandasuchus and Qianosuchus; although in the latter two the presence of specifically caudal armor is either uncertain or outright missing. The individual osteoderms are longer than wide, drop-shaped, bear a ridge running down their midline but are otherwise relatively smooth and symmetrical with irregular outer margins featuring pronounced denticles. These osteoderms, which in life would have been positioned along the spine, are arranged in pairs to form a double row, with each vertebra roughly corresponding to two or three osteoderm pairs along the tail. Further down towards the end of the tail, preserved thanks to an articulated series of vertebrae, the osteoderms are reduced to a single row, again with three osteoderms for each vertebra. The mid-distal tail osteoderms are described as resembling a lying figure 8, formed by a smaller anterior section and a larger posterior end. Dalla Vecchia and Cau speculate that this distinct shape might be related to the anterior part underlying the preceding osteoderm or alternatively that this condition was caused by osteoderms fusing together into a single unit. The more anterior osteoderms are possibly more comparable to those of Prestosuchus and Rauisuchus as well as some osteoderms tentatively referred to Batrachotomus. They are, however, quite easily distinguished from those of Ticinosuchus from the Ladinian of Switzerland and Italy, in which the osteoderms aren't only pentagonal in shape but furthermore arranged along a single medial row even at the base of the tail. A paired arrangement like that of Carinthiasuchus is otherwise also seen in Polonosuchus. There is no evidence that Carinthiasuchus had osteoderms at the underside of the tail like those seen in Ticinosuchus and Decuriasuchus, though this could be related to the preservation of the specimen.

== Phylogeny ==
Life restoration

The phylogenetic analyses conducted by Dalla Vecchia and Cau recover Carinthiasuchus as a member of the clade Poposauroidea, an early branch of Pseudosuchia well known for its great morphological diversity. Within this grouping, it appears to have been an early-diverging member, retaining a number of basal features and clading closely with Qianosuchus from the Anisian of China, though support for this relationship is low on account of the fragmentary nature of the fossil material. Carinthiasuchus can however be confidently excluded from certain derived poposauroid clades such as the sail-backed ctenosauriscids and bipedal shuvosaurids. Attempts to force a relationship with other European crocodylomorphs like Batrachotomus, Polonosuchus and Ticinosuchus have furthermore shown that its placement in Poposauroidea is the most optimal outcome, with rauisuchian affinities being less likely.

- Poposauroidea
  - Mambawakale
  - - Mandasuchus
    - - Schultzsuchus
      - - - Carinthiasuchus
          - Qianosuchus
        - - - Xilousuchus
            - Arizonasaurus
          - - Poposaurus
            - - Lotosaurus
              - Shuvosauridae
                - Sillosuchus
                - - Effigia
                  - Shuvosaurus
