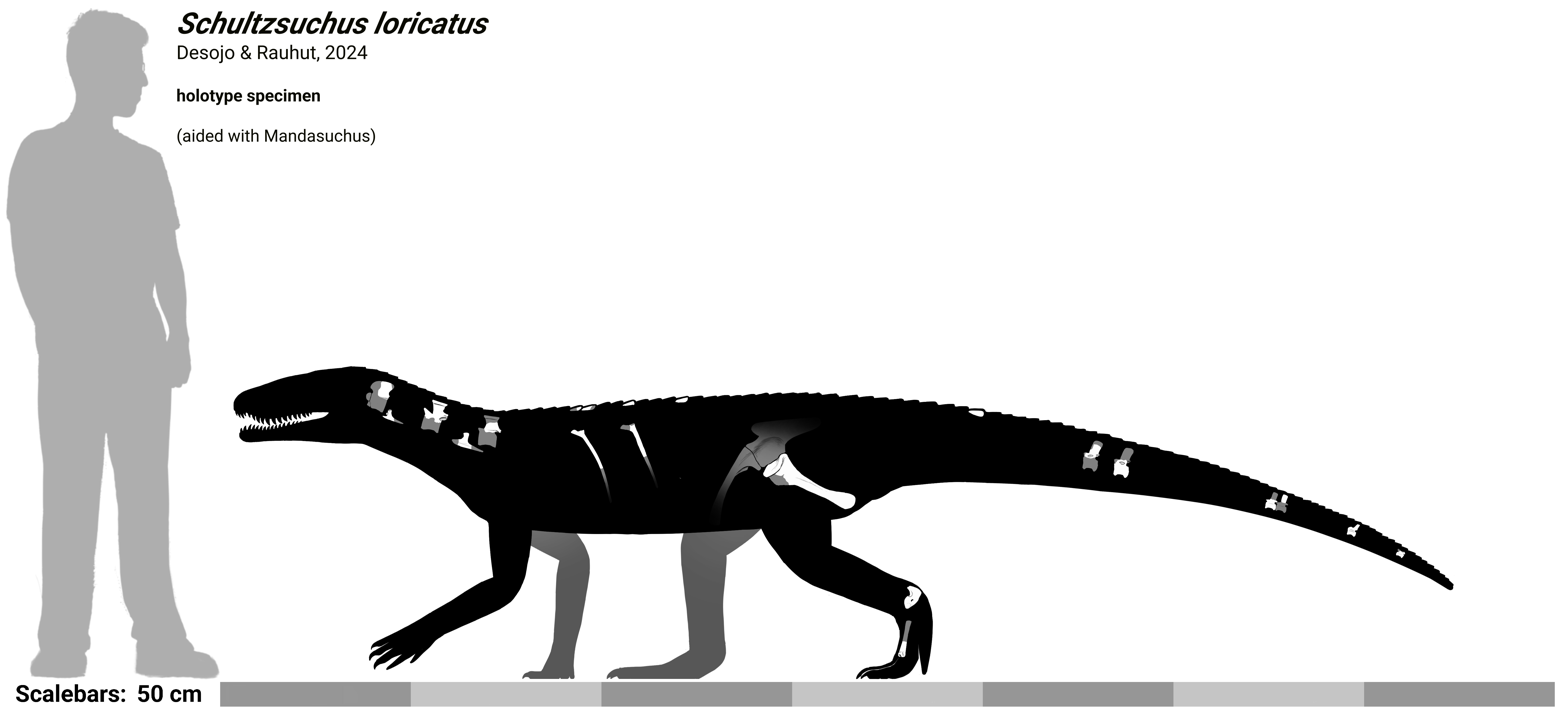
- Skeletal reconstruction of the know remains

Scientific classification
- Kingdom: Animalia
- Phylum: Chordata
- Class: Reptilia
- Clade: Archosauria
- Clade: Pseudosuchia
- Clade: †Poposauroidea
- Genus: †Schultzsuchus; Desojo & Rauhut, 2024
- Species: †S. loricatus

Binomial name
- †Schultzsuchus loricatus Desojo & Rauhut, 2024

Synonyms
- Prestosuchus loricatus von Huene, 1938

= Schultzsuchus =

Schultzsuchus Temporal range: Triassic, Ladinian–Carnian

Extinct species of reptiles

Schultzsuchus is an extinct genus of pseudosuchian from the Triassic Santa Maria Formation of Brazil. Initially described as a species of Prestosuchus, a 2024 study found the taxon to differ in multiple aspects of its anatomy, enough to warrant it being placed in a distinct genus. Unlike Prestosuchus, which is a more derived member of Loricata, Schultzsuchus appears to have been a basal member of the clade Poposauroidea.

== History and naming ==
The remains of what is now called Schultzsuchus were first described under the name Prestosuchus loricatus by German paleontologist Friedrich von Huene in 1938, who had recovered the fossils of this pseudosuchian from the Cynodontier Sanga of the Santa Maria Supersequence in 1928/29 and regarded the animal as having been congeneric with Prestosuchus chiniquensis, also named by him.

While Prestosuchus chiniquensis saw several additional finds attributed to it over the years, making it one of the best understood early pseudosuchians, P. loricatus received much less attention. This was in part due to the nature of the material, which consisted of a singular tooth crown, some vertebrae, elements of the hindlimbs as well as osteoderms. In 1942 von Huene tentatively referred some additional vertebrae and a calcaneum to this taxon, but he himself was uncertain of this assessment.

The validity of P. loricatus eventually came into question, with several authors regarding this a possibility. Krebs (1976) and Barberena (1978) regarded the species to have probably been synonymous with P. chiniquensis, though Krebs remarked that a comprehensive study of the type material was required to tell for sure. Parrish (1993) seemed to follow this interpretation as well, combining material of both species interchangeably when scoring it for a phylogenetic analysis. Kischlat went further by arguing that the type material of P. loricatus actually belonged to two different animals, which he named Karamuru vorax and Abaporu loricatus. However, these names are regarded as somewhat problematic, as Abaporu loricatus was only mentioned a single time with no other occurrences of the name within the same publication. Furthermore, no formal proposition of a new generic name was made, no holotype was proposed and even the given specimen number is noted for being flawed according to Desojo and Rauhut. Ultimately, both Karamuru and Abaporu are regarded as nomina nuda. A thorough examination of the type material of Prestosuchus loricatus was eventually published by Desojo and Rauhut in 2024, who agreed with Kischlat (2023) in so far that the material did represent a taxon distinct from Prestosuchus, which they dubbed Schultzsuchus.

Schultzsuchus was named in honor of Cesar Schultz, who was noted for his contributions to the understanding of the vertebrate fauna of the Santa Maria Supersequence.

== Description ==
Schultzsuchus is only known from limited material thought to have belonged to a single individual, though this is sometimes called into question. Among the material are the tip of a tooth, the neural arch of the axis vertebra, three additional neural arches of the neck vertebrae (one of which complete), partial cervical and dorsal ribs, four tail vertebrae and the neural arch and neural spine of two more. Fossils of the hindlimbs are also known, namely both ischia still in articulation, a single calcaneum and a few metatarsals. Finally, several osteoderms have also been described for this taxon.

The only known skull remains of Schultzsuchus consist of a single tooth crown. The element is conical in shape and stout, but with laterally compressed sides and carinae that feature partially abraded serrations (ziphodont). The tooth is recurved, causing the mesial carina to be convex in shape, while the carina facing towards the back of the jaw is straight. The only carina well-enough preserved to show the amount of serrations is the mesial carina, which has about 10 denticles across 5 mm (0.20 in), which is only slightly lower than the amount seen in Heptasuchus. There has been some doubt on the assignment of the tooth to Schultzsuchus given the fact that it's an isolated element not directly associated with any other material while also having been found with the fossils of a synapsid. However, the shape does suggest that it belonged to what was likely a paracrocodylomorph or some other predatory archosaur.

A notable feature that distinguishes Schultzsuchus from Prestosuchus is the fact that the cervical vertebrae preserve epipophyses, which are generally absent from pseudosuchians bar some exceptions. Desojo and Rauhut describe the epipophyses of Schultzsuchus as being high ridges that are clearly set apart from the postzygapophysis that they protrude from, anatomy best matched by Revueltosaurus (a stem-aetosaur), dinosaurs, Stagonosuchus, Rauisuchus and Postosuchus alisonae. Similarly, an epipophysis is also present on the second neck vertebra, the axis, which is even less common and stated to be present in Revueltosaurus, Longosuchus, Xilousuchus and possibly Effigia.

The neural spine of the neck vertebrae also represents a markedly different anatomy from Prestosuchus and most other basal loricatans. In those forms the neural spine tends to be short from the front to the back and tall, keeping a relatively consistent rectangular profile and being notably thickened. Schultzsuchus meanwhile has neural spines is visibly longer anteroposteriorly and shaped like a fan, owing to the spinous process expanding towards the top most edge of the bone. Even more so than the presence of epipophysis, this element could suggest affinities with poposauroids, as Desojo and Rauhut note that the only other pseudosuchians with such neural spines are Xilousuchus, Qianosuchus, Arizonasaurus and Mandasuchus, all of which appeared as poposauroids in their 2024 publication on Schultzsuchus.

The elongated neural arches might indicate that Schultzsuchus had elongated neck vertebrae, a notion that might find additional support in the presence of just such a vertebra from the type locality. While this bone was originally assigned to a saurischian, its anatomy is similar to that of a poposauroid, with some taxa within this group even having elongated necks. Though Desojo and Rauhut do not concretely assign the vertebrae to Schultzsuchus, further study could change that.

The ischium, of which both elements are preserved in articulation, preserves a large pit on the surface where the bones would articulate with the ilium. Such a pit is absent in Prestosuchus and seen in some, but not all, poposauroids. Schultzsuchus also lacks the longitudinal depression that is found across the shaft of most early Loricatan ischia and is thus considered a synapomorphy of the clade by Desojo and Rauhut.

The calcaneum, the heel bone, of Schultzsuchus has a tuber that is much higher than it is broad, which is the exact opposite of Prestosuchus, in which the tuber is broader than it is high. Both did possess a pit in the underside of the tuber, but it is noted as being much shallower in Schultzsuchus.

== Phylogeny ==
Several phylogenetic analysis were run to determine the position of Schultzsuchus among pseudosuchians, yielding some results that stand in stark contrast to the position of Prestosuchus. Both the equally weighted and implied weighted suggest that Schultzsuchus was not a prestosuchid but rather an early diverging member of the clade Poposauroidea. Mandasuchus and Mambawakale were also derived as poposauroids in more basal positions than Schultzsuchus, but according to Desojo and Rauhut it would only take a few steps for either of them to be recovered within Loricata. Schultzsuchus meanwhile was recovered as the sister taxon of Qianosuchus and all more derived poposauroids (consisting of Poposauridae, Shuvosauridae, Lotosaurus and Ctenosauriscidae). This is primarily based on two anatomical characters shared with poposauroids (both relating to the neck vertebrae) and the absence of traits seen in the derived members of the clade. The only analysis that fail to recover these results are those with higher weighing strengths, which instead place Schultzsuchus as being placed in a more derived position than Saurosuchus towards the crown of Pseudosuchia.

- - Euparkeria
  - Archosauria
    - Phytosauria
    - - Avemetatarsalia
      - Pseudosuchia
        - Ornithosuchidae
        - - - Erpetosuchidae
            - - Revueltosaurus
              - Aetosauria
          - - Nundasuchus
            - - Gracilisuchidae
              - - Ticinosuchus
                - - Poposauroidea
                    - Mambawakale
                    - - Mandasuchus
                      - - Schultzsuchus
                        - - Qianosuchus
                          - - - Arizonasaurus
                              - Xilousuchus
                            - - Poposaurus
                              - - Lotosaurus
                                - - Sillosuchus
                                  - - Effigia
                                    - Shuvosaurus
                  - Loricata
