= Dolichobrachium =

Dolichobrachium Temporal range: Late Triassic

Scientific classification
- Domain: Eukaryota
- Kingdom: Animalia
- Phylum: Chordata
- Class: Reptilia
- Clade: Archosauria
- Clade: Pseudosuchia
- Clade: Suchia
- Clade: Paracrocodylomorpha
- Clade: †Poposauroidea
- Family: †Poposauridae
- Genus: †Dolichobrachium; Williston, 1904

Species
- †D. gracile Williston, 1904 (type)

Extinct genus of reptiles

Dolichobrachium is a dubious genus of extinct poposaurid crurotarsan. Fossils have been found from the Popo Agie Formation in Wyoming and are of Late Triassic age. It was one of the first rauisuchians to have been named.
