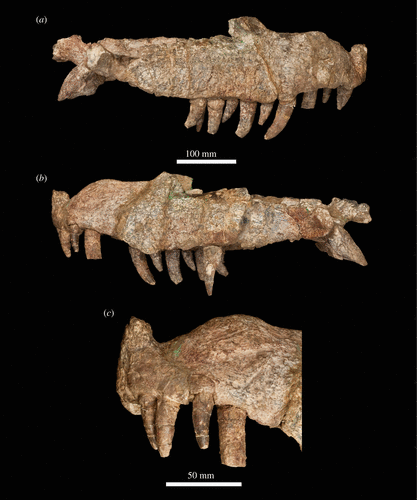
- Holotype skull of Mambawakale
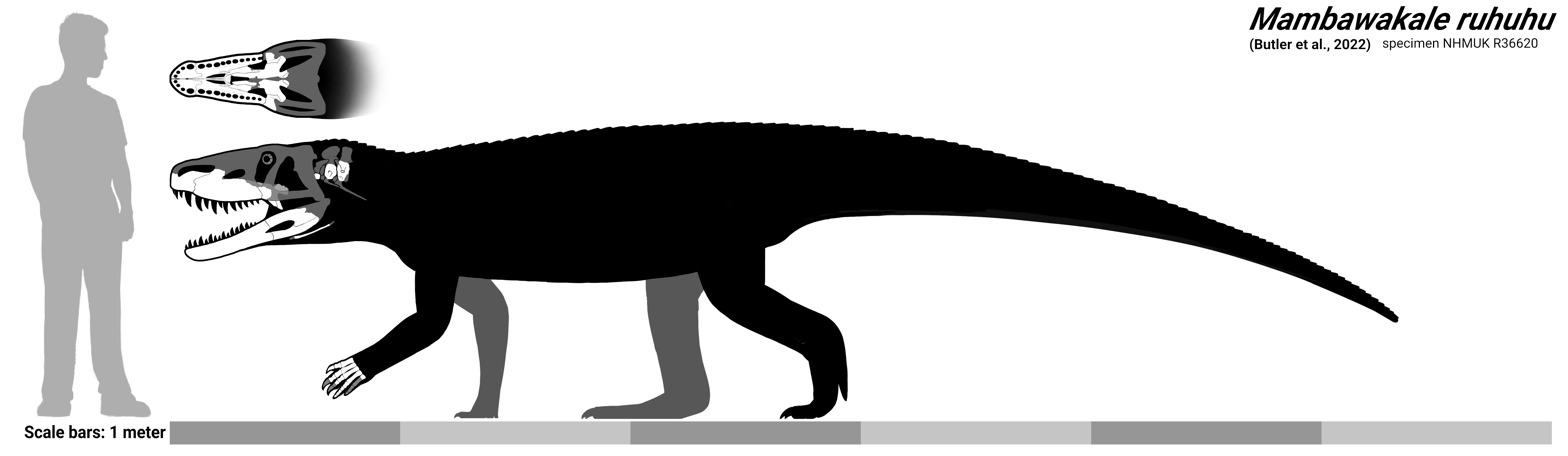
- Hypothetical size comparison and skeletal reconstruction of the known remains (in white)

Scientific classification
- Kingdom: Animalia
- Phylum: Chordata
- Class: Reptilia
- Clade: Pseudosuchia
- Clade: Paracrocodylomorpha
- Genus: †Mambawakale; Butler et al., 2022
- Species: †M. ruhuhu

Binomial name
- †Mambawakale ruhuhu Butler et al., 2022

= Mambawakale =

Mambawakale Temporal range: Middle Triassic (Anisian?) 247.2–242 Ma

Extinct genus of reptiles

Mambawakale is a genus of large sized basal paracrocodylomorph, possibly a poposauroid, from the Manda Beds of Tanzania. It was informally named Pallisteria before being officially published under its current name almost 60 years after its discovery. It contains a single species, Mambawakale ruhuhu.

== History and naming ==
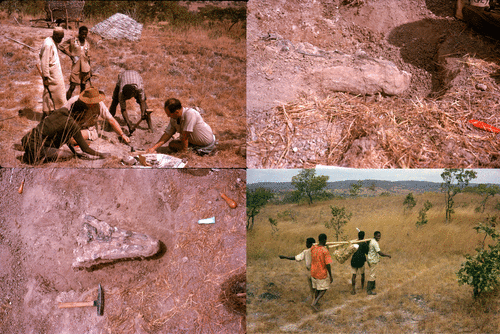
Photos taken during an expedition to the Manda Beds in 1963

In 1963, following the independence of Tanzania, Alan Charig participated in a joint expedition of the Natural History Museum, London and the University of London, as well as researchers from Uganda, South Africa and Edinburgh, to Tanzania and Zambia. The expedition heavily relied on the support of locals who had discovered the localities and fossils within them, although they went unnamed in the field notes. The fossils discovered in 1963 were collected and stored in the Natural History Museum of London. Among these fossils was the incomplete skull of a large crocodylomorph, noted for its large size and informally referred to as Pallisteria angustimentum (after Charig's friend John Weaver Pallister and the Latin words "angustus" and "mentum", meaning "narrow chin). Little information was given on Pallisteria, with neither details, figures or even a specimen number being noted down. The manuscript, although listed as "in press", was never published nor recovered from the archives, rendering Pallisteria (and the family Pallisteriidae) a nomen nudum. Following the formal description of Teleocrater, Mandasuchus, Hypselorhachis and Nyasasaurus, Pallisteria was the last of the significant fossil archosaurs reported by Charig to be formally published. A formal description of the holotype specimen (NHMUK R36620) was eventually published 59 years later in 2022 by Richard J. Butler and colleagues, who named it Mambawakale. In addition to the skull, Butler's team also described associated postcranial material mentioned in the field notes, including elements of the cervical series and a left manus.

The name Mambawakale is a composite of the Kiswahili words "mamba" (crocodile) and "wakale" (ancient). The species name refers to the Ruhuhu Basin where the fossils have been found.

== Description ==
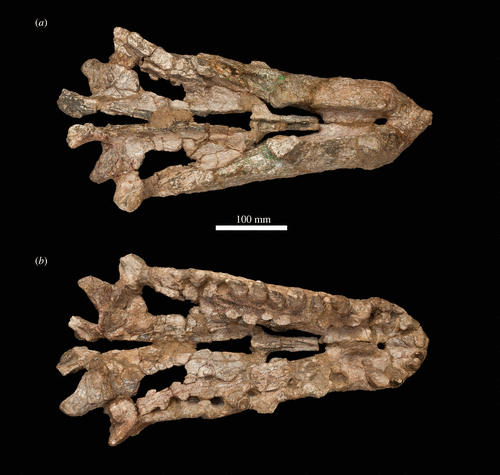
Dorsal and ventral view of Mambawakale

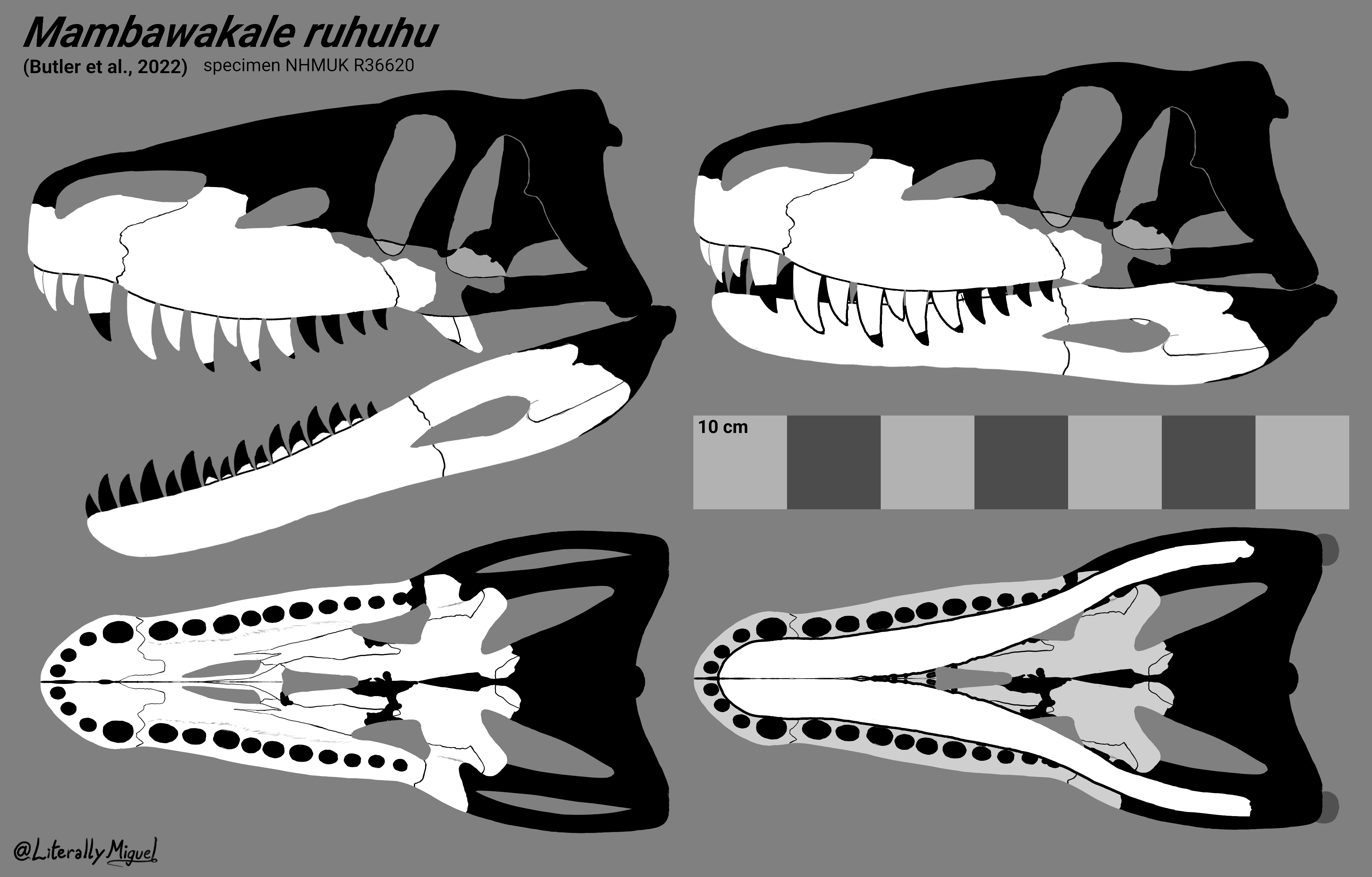
Reconstruction of the skull in dorsal and ventral view. Preserved bones in white, estimations based in close relatives in black.

Mambawakale would have been a large sized Pseudosuchian of unknown age. Although only the lower edge of the external nares is preserved, it's extent over most of the premaxilla and the front most part of the maxilla suggests they were large in size, comparable to Batrachotomus. The contact between the premaxilla and maxilla is marked by a slight constriction visible when viewing the skull from below and is located within a short toothless section of the jaw (diastema). The surface of the palate shows a series of pits that likely received the teeth of the mandible when the jaw was closed. Each premaxilla contains four teeth, the last of which being notably larger than the first three and more similar to those of the maxilla. This notable heterodonty of the premaxillary teeth is described as an autapomorphy of Mambawakale and differs greatly from most other archosauriforms. The surface of the maxilla, although badly preserved, shows no signs of rugosity and appears smooth. Generally, the maxilla share several characteristics with both Saurosuchus and Prestosuchus. In overall shape the maxilla are straight, diverging from one another as they move away from the premaxilla. The maxilla appear to contain ten teeth each showing little variation in size unlike those of the premaxilla. There is however a slight reduction over the last 4 teeth. The hemimandibles of the lower jaw form an elongated symphisys, which gives the chin a narrow appearance as noted by Charig when naming P. angustimentum. Although at one point considered a derived trait of ornithosuchids, this morphology can also be observed in other groups such as crocodyliforms, poposauroids and phytosaurs. The shallow dentary contains fifteen to sixteen ziphodont teeth. The centrum of the axis in Mambawakale is similar to that of Stagonosuchus, making it a possibility that the two taxa may represent the same species. However, the absence of well preserved postcranial material in Mambawakale and well preserved cranial material in Stagonosuchus makes it impossible to make a definitive statement on the matter. Mambawakale is easily distinguished from both Parringtonia and Nundasuchus and likely does not represent Hypselorhachis or Mandasuchus either.

Mambawakale would have been one of the largest Pseudosuchians of the middle Triassic, comparable in size with Etjosuchus.

== Phylogeny ==
The strict consensus tree of its type description recovered Mambawakale as a basal paracrocodylomorph in a polytomy with two other Manda Bed Pseudosuchians, Poposauroidea and Loricata. The inclusion of Nundasuchus did not affect this placement in the phylogenetic tree. However, overall its position within Archosauria is only weakly resolved and poorly supported. It was clearly identified as an archosaur, however its placement in Pseudosuchia was regarded as less certain, given that many traits that would nest it in the group are more broadly found across other archosaur clades.

- Archosauria
  - Pseudosuchia
    - Ornithosuchidae
    - - - Erpetosuchidae
        - - Revueltosaurus
          - Aetosauria
      - - Gracilisuchidae
        - - Ticinosuchus
          - Paracrocodylomorpha
            - Poposauroidea
            - Mandasuchus
            - Stagonosuchus
            - Mambawakale
            - Loricata
              - Saurosuchus
              - - Prestosuchus
                - - Luperosuchus
                  - - - Heptasuchus
                      - Batrachotomus
                    - - Fasolasuchus
                      - - - Rauisuchus
                          - - Postosuchus alisonae
                            - Postosuchus kirkpatricki
                            - Polonosuchus
                        - Crocodylomorpha

A later study from 2024, focusing on Schultzsuchus from the Santa Maria Formation of Brazil, suggested an alternative placement. In said study's phylogeny, Mambawakale was recovered as the earliest branching member of the clade Poposauroidea, which was a diverse group containing several morphologically distinct pseudosuchians such as the bipedal Poposaurus, the sail-backed ctenosauriscids and the superficially ornithomimosaur-like Shuvosauridae. This placement was in large parts supported by three anatomical characters all relating to the maxilla. However, it is noted by Desojo and Rauhut that it would only take one step for Mambawakale to be recovered as a basal loricatan, meaning its placement was not without question.

- - Euparkeria
  - Archosauria
    - Phytosauria
    - - Avemetatarsalia
      - Pseudosuchia
        - Ornithosuchidae
        - - - Erpetosuchidae
            - - Revueltosaurus
              - Aetosauria
          - - Nundasuchus
            - - Gracilisuchidae
              - - Ticinosuchus
                - - Poposauroidea
                    - Mambawakale
                    - - Mandasuchus
                      - - Schultzsuchus
                        - - Qianosuchus
                          - - - Arizonasaurus
                              - Xilousuchus
                            - - Poposaurus
                              - - Lotosaurus
                                - - Sillosuchus
                                  - - Effigia
                                    - Shuvosaurus
                  - Loricata
