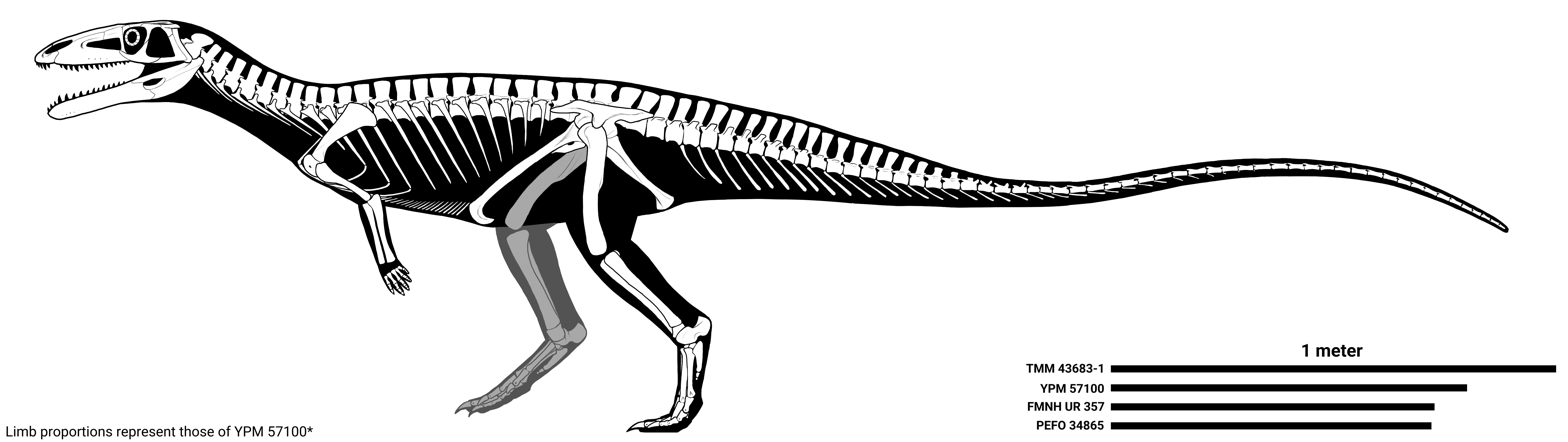
- Skeletal reconstruction of Poposaurus gracilis
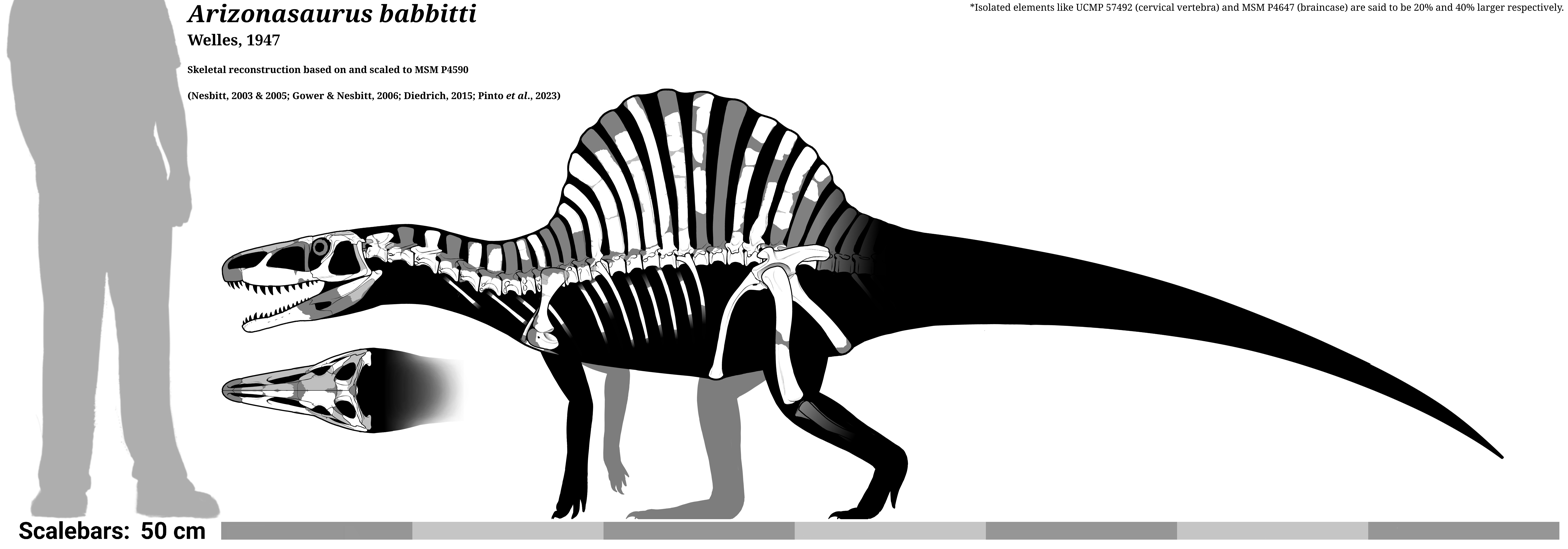
- Skeletal reconstruction of Arizonasaurus babbitti

Scientific classification
- Kingdom: Animalia
- Phylum: Chordata
- Class: Reptilia
- Clade: Pseudosuchia
- Clade: Suchia
- Clade: Paracrocodylomorpha
- Clade: †Poposauroidea; Nopsca, 1923

Subgroups
- †Benggwigwishingasuchus; †Carinthiasuchus; †Lotosaurus; †Mambawakale?; †Mandasuchus?; †Qianosuchus; †Schultzsuchus; †Stagonosuchus?; †Tainrakuasuchus; †Ctenosauriscidae; †Poposauridae; †Shuvosauridae

Synonyms
- "Group X" Nesbitt, 2005

= Poposauroidea =

Poposauroidea Temporal range: Early-Late Triassic, 248–201.3 Ma

Extinct clade of reptiles

Poposauroidea is a clade of advanced pseudosuchians. It includes poposaurids, shuvosaurids, ctenosauriscids, and other unusual pseudosuchians such as Qianosuchus and Lotosaurus. It excludes most large predatory quadrupedal "rauisuchians" such as rauisuchids and "prestosuchids". Those reptiles are now allied with crocodylomorphs (crocodile ancestors) in a clade known as Loricata, which is the sister taxon to the poposauroids in the clade Paracrocodylomorpha. Although it was first formally defined in 2007, the name "Poposauroidea" has been used for many years. The group has been referred to as Poposauridae by some authors, although this name is often used more narrowly to refer to the family that includes Poposaurus and its close relatives. It was phylogenetically defined in 2011 by Sterling Nesbitt as Poposaurus gracilis and all taxa more closely related to it than to Postosuchus kirkpatricki, Crocodylus niloticus (the Nile crocodile), Ornithosuchus woodwardi, or Aetosaurus ferratus.

Poposauroids went extinct at the end of the Triassic period along with other non-crocodylomorph pseudosuchians. They were among the most diverse and longest lasting members of non-crocodylomorph Pseudosuchia, with Xilousuchus (a ctenosauriscid) living near the very beginning of the Triassic and Effigia (a shuvosaurid) surviving up until near the end of the Triassic. Despite the high level of diversity and anatomical disparity within Poposauroidea, certain features of the clade can be determined, particularly in the structure of the snout and pelvis (hip). Many of these features are examples of convergent evolution with dinosaurs, with bipedal poposauroids such as Poposaurus and shuvosaurids having been mistaken for theropod dinosaurs in the past.

== Features ==
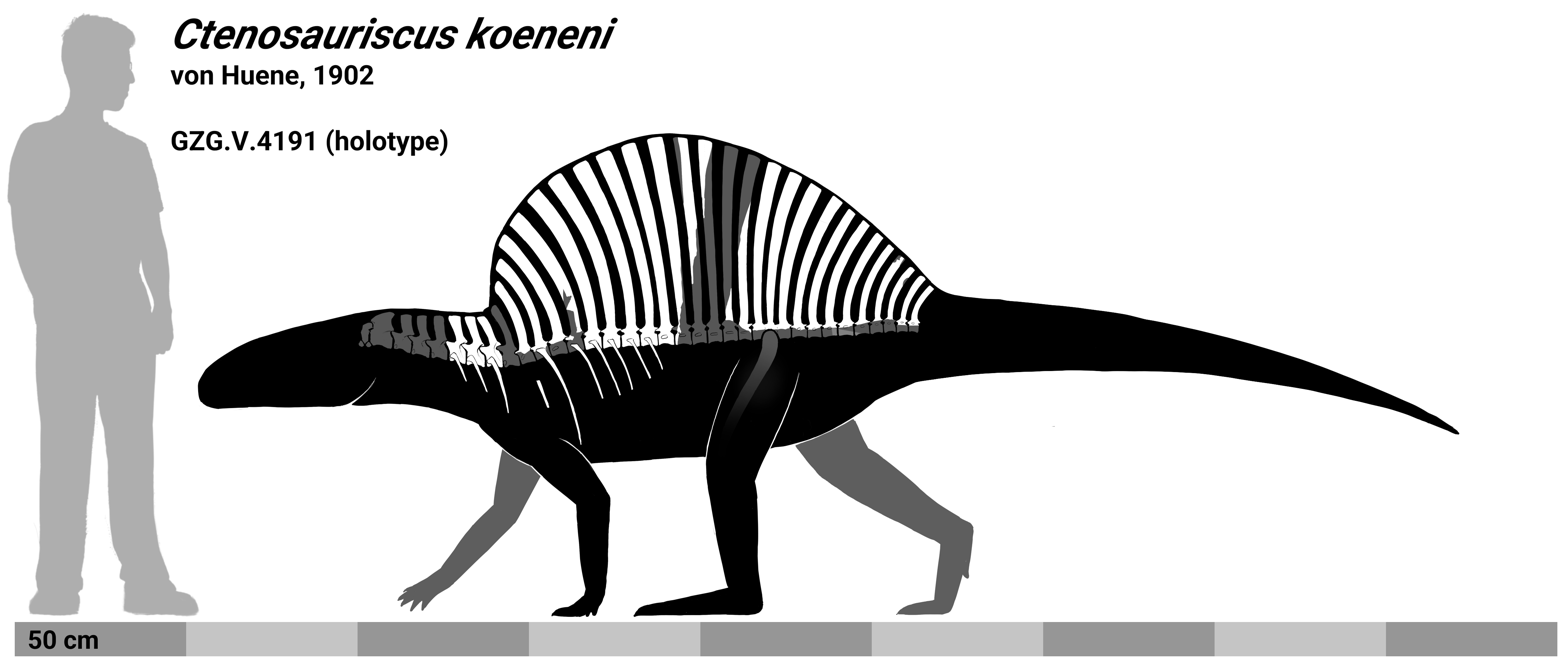
Skeletal reconstruction of the known remains of Ctenosauriscus, showcasing its characteristic sail

Poposauroidea was a diverse group of pseudosuchians, containing genera with many different ecological adaptations. Some (Poposaurus and shuvosaurids) were short-armed bipeds, while others (ctenosauriscids and Lotosaurus) were robust quadrupeds with elongated neural spines, creating a 'sail' like that of certain "pelycosaurs" (like Dimetrodon) and spinosaurids. Lotosaurus and shuvosaurids were toothless and presumably beaked herbivores while Qianosuchus, Poposaurus and ctenosauriscids were sharp-toothed predators. The ecological disparity of many members of this clade means that it is difficult to assess what the ancestral poposauroid would have looked like.

=== Skull and vertebrae ===
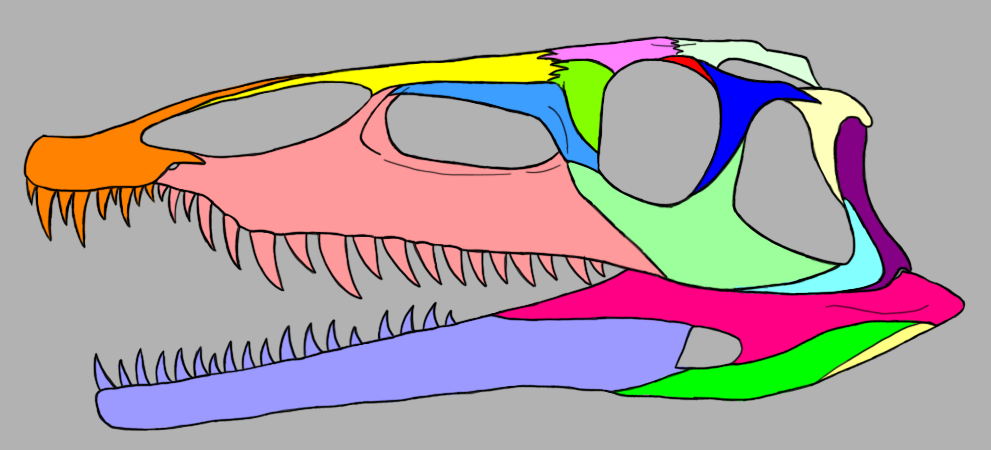
The skull of Qianosuchus, the earliest-diverging genus of poposauroid. Note the arrangement and structure of skull bones around the enlarged nares. Key: Premaxilla Maxilla Nasal Lacrimal Prefrontal Frontal Jugal Postorbital Postfrontal / Pareital Squamosal Quadrate Quadratojugal Surangular / Articular Prearticular Angular Dentary

Poposauroids can be differentiated from other pseudosuchians by the structure of the tip of the snout, particularly the premaxillary bone which lies in front of the nares (nostril holes). This bone possesses two bony extensions ("processes") which wrap around the nares. The anterodorsal process, which wraps above the nares to contact the nasal bones on the top edge of the snout, is typically quite short in pseudosuchians. Poposauroids have elongated anterodorsal processes, longer than the main premaxillary body. The posterodorsal process, which wraps below the nares to contact the maxilla on the side of the snout, possesses the opposite state. It is much shorter in poposauroids (compared to other pseudosuchians), restricted to only a portion of the lower edge of the nares. This has the added effect of allowing the maxilla to form the rest of the hole's lower and rear edge, with the front edge of the maxilla becoming concave as well. Although these snout features are rare among pseudosuchians, they are much more common in certain avemetatarsalians (bird-line archosaurs) such as pterosaurs and saurischian dinosaurs. The rear branch of the maxilla tapers in most poposauroids, with the exception of Qianosuchus. This contrasts with loricatans, in which this branch is rectangular in shape.

Poposauroids also possess several features which are unusual compared to archosaurs in general. For example, in most archosaurs each side of the braincase possesses a pit from where the internal carotid arteries may exit the brain. In early poposauroids, these pits migrated to the underside of the braincase, thereby resembling the primitive condition seen in archosaur relatives such as Euparkeria and proterochampsians. Nevertheless, this reversion is undone in shuvosaurids (and possibly earlier, although no braincase material is known in Poposaurus or Lotosaurus). In addition, most poposauroids possessed elongated necks, and all of them had long and thin cervical ribs. This second neck trait contrasts with the condition in other pseudosuchians, phytosaurs, and pterosaurs, which have short and stout cervical ribs. The neural spines of the dorsal (back) vertebrae are thin and plate-like, even in members of Poposauroidea without sails. This differs compared to the vertebrae of most other early pseudosuchians (as well as Euparkeria and phytosaurs), which have neural spines that expand outward to form a flat, rectangular surface when seen from above.

=== Pelvis ===
Like other reptiles, the pelvis of poposauroids is formed by three plate-like bones: the ilium which lies above the acetabulum (hip socket), the pubis which is below and in front of the acetabulum, and the ischium which is below and behind the acetabulum. The ilium is a large, complex bone, with a forward-pointing (preacetabular) process, a rear-pointing (postacetabular) process, and a lower portion which forms the upper edge of the acetabulum. In most archosaurs, the lower portion of the ilium is wedge-shaped, forming the inner face of a "closed" acetabulum. In poposauroids the lower portion of the ilium is concave, creating a partially to completely "open" acetabulum formed by open space instead of bone. The only other archosaurs with open hip sockets are dinosaurs and (to a lesser extent) crocodylomorphs. The upper edge of the acetabulum is formed by a pronounced ridge on the ilium, known as a supraacetabular rim or crest.

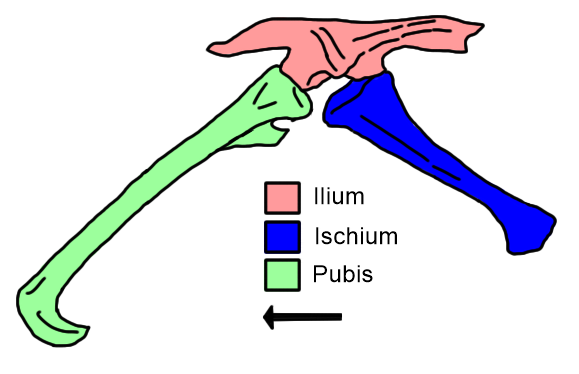
The pelvis of Poposaurus, showing the many traits unique to poposauroid hips.

Although all poposauroids possessed open acetabula, most other specializations of the ilium did not evolve until the clade containing Poposaurus and the shuvosaurids. For example, the supraacetabular crest projects downward, rather than outward in this clade. This trait is rare in archosaurs, only evolving independently in a few early theropod dinosaurs such as Coelophysis and Dilophosaurus. Another feature is the presence of an additional diagonal crest which branches upward from the supraacetabular rim. Although such a crest evolved independently in a number of different archosaurs, this specific subset of poposauroids is unique in having the crest be inclined forward (rather than vertical) and confluent with the elongated preacetabular blade, which is another derived feature of the clade.

The pubis and ischium were also specialized in poposauroids. In every other archosaur, the two bones contact each other on the lower edge of the acetabulum. In poposauroids other than Qianosuchus and Lotosaurus, the bones did not touch, leaving the acetabulum open from the sides and below. The width of the pubis is variable at different parts of its shaft. The portion near the acetabulum is thickened, but the tip of the bone (except in Qianosuchus) is very thin when seen head-on. In most other archosaurs, the pubis has a consistent width. Theropod dinosaurs and a few other archosaurs have a distal part of the pubis which is thinner than the proximal part. Shuvosaurids and Lotosaurus also possessed ischia (on either side of the body) which were fused to each other at the midline of the body.

=== Sacrum ===
Although the ancestral archosaur only had two sacral (hip) vertebrae, many different archosaur groups acquired additional sacral vertebrae over the course of their evolution. Nesbitt (2011) argued that additional sacral vertebrae formed between these two "primordial" vertebrae. He gave the well-preserved sacrum of the poposauroid Arizonasaurus as evidence to this process. Poposauroids have three to four sacral vertebrae, with the last and third-to-last vertebrae articulating with the ilium in a way similar to the two primordial vertebrae of more primitive archosauriformes such as Euparkeria and phytosaurs. The second-to-last vertebra has a form unlike the vertebrae of these archosauriforms, and Nesbitt concluded that it was an "insertion", formed from the innermost sections of the two primordial vertebrae. Although this process is not unique to poposauroids, it is only known in a few other archosaur lineages, such as Batrachotomus, silesaurids, and dinosaurs.

Basal poposauroids such as Arizonasaurus and Qianosuchus only had three sacral vertebra, with the second vertebra being the 'insertion'. More advanced poposauroids such as Poposaurus and shuvosaurids have four sacral vertebrae, the third recognizable as the insertion. This means that the first vertebra must have been another addition, seemingly the last dorsal vertebra which had been repurposed and transformed into a sacral vertebra. This incorporated dorsal vertebra called a dorsosacral. They were irregularly distributed among archosaurs, known in a few ornithosuchids and aetosaurs as well as a variety of dinosaurs (most commonly in ornithischians and theropods)

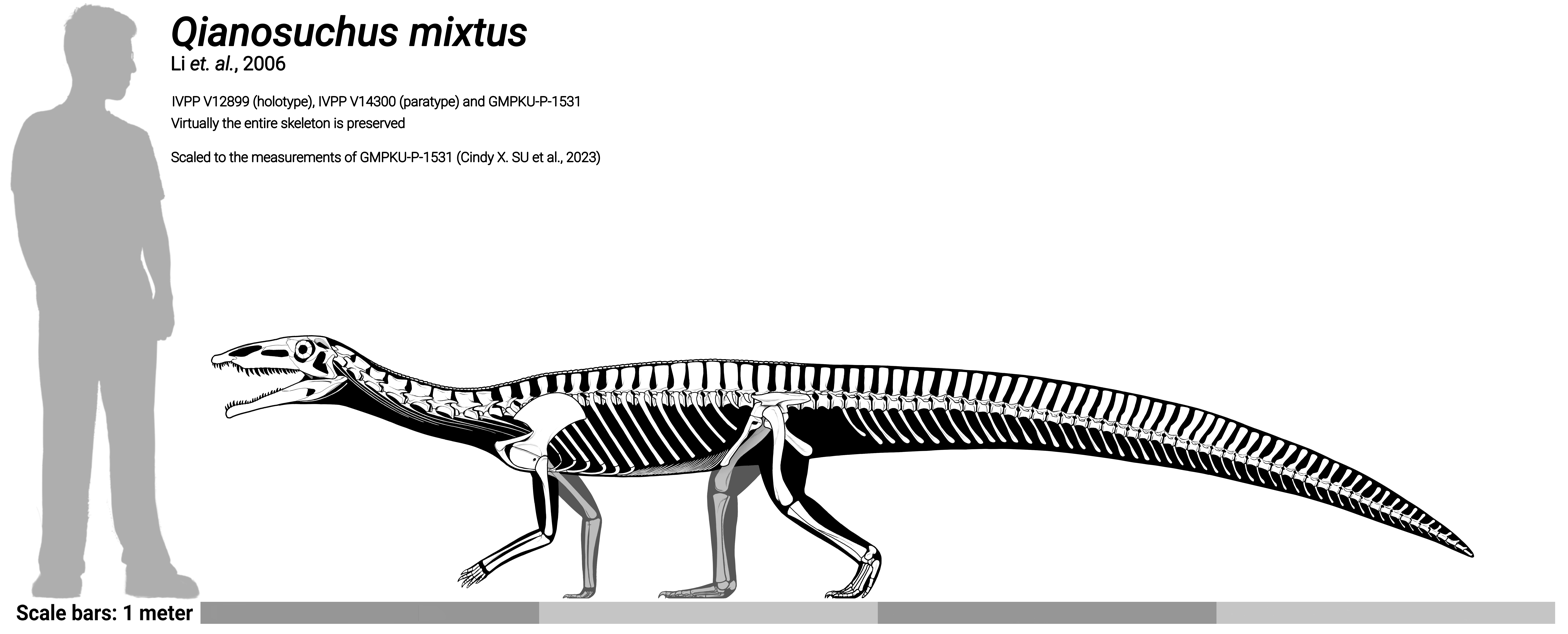
Skeletal reconstruction of Qianosuchus, showcasing numerous diminute osteoderms

In almost all archosariforms, the sacral ribs of the first primordial sacral vertebra contact the ilium near the base of that bone, close to its contact with the pubis. Poposauroids had first primordial sacral ribs with additional forward branches, which lie on the inner edge of the ilium's preacetabular blade. In poposauroids more advanced than Qianosuchus, the sacral vertebrae fuse into a single bone, the sacrum. This fusion occurred incrementally, at different portions of the vertebra. For example, the zygapophyses fused together as early as the ctenosauriscids. The centra (main cylindrical portion) of the sacral vertebrae also may have fused as early as the ctenosauriscids. The bases of the neural arches (the portion of the vertebrae above the spinal cord) were fused in some ctenosauriscids (Arizonasaurus) but not others (Bromsgroveia), and were also fused in all poposauroids more advanced than the ctenosauriscids.

=== Other ===
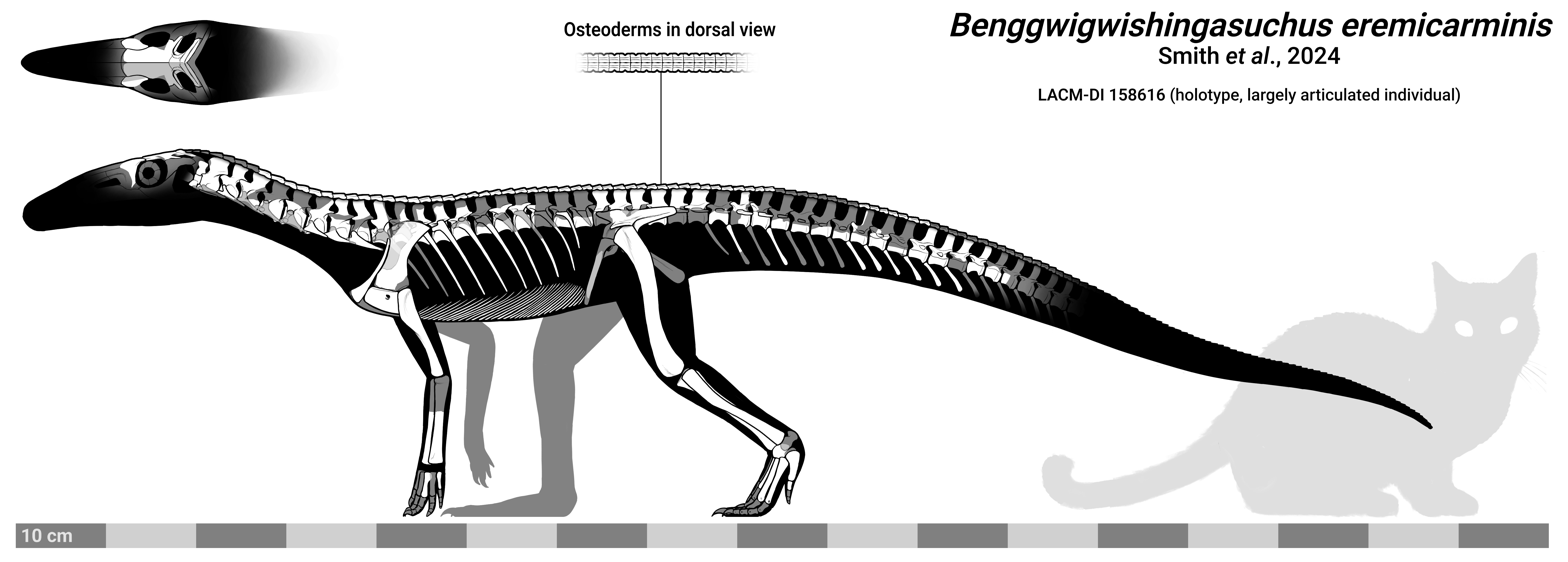
Skeletal reconstruction of Benggwigwishingasuchus

Unlike most pseudosuchians, derived poposauroids lack bony scutes known as osteoderms. With exceptions like Qianosuchus or Benggwigwishingasuchus which possessed numerous tiny osteoderms, lying in a row extending down the neck and body. In all poposauroids, the tip of the fibula (outer shin bone) is symmetrical and straight when seen from the side, rather than slanted as in other non-crocodylomorph pseudosuchians. Those more advanced than ctenosauriscids had flattened hooflike pedal unguals (toe claws). Some poposauroids had very short arms compared to the length of their legs, although disarticulation in Qianosuchus and a lack of limb material in ctenosauriscids means that it is unknown whether this trait was basal to the group as a whole. Missing data for ctenosauriscids also obscures when certain traits of the caudal vertebrae and ankle bones were gained or lost within Poposauroidea.

== History ==
Franz Nopcsa first used the term Poposauridae in 1923 to refer to poposauroids. At this time, the sole member of the group was Poposaurus, which was considered to be a theropod dinosaur. Over the following years, poposauroids were placed in various groups, including Saurischia, Theropoda, and Carnosauria. This classification existed up until the 1970s, when better remains indicated that Poposaurus was a pseudosuchian rather than a dinosaur. Other genera such as Sillosuchus and Shuvosaurus were later erected. Like Poposaurus, Shuvosaurus was originally thought to be a theropod dinosaur.

Sankar Chatterjee reclassified poposauroids as theropod dinosaurs with his description of the new genus Postosuchus in 1985. Chatterjee even considered poposauroids to be the ancestors of tyrannosaurs. Postosuchus was widely considered to be a poposauroid for the next ten years and was included in many phylogenetic analyses of Triassic archosaurs. In 1995, Robert Long and Phillip A Murry noted that several specimens referred to Postosuchus were distinct from the holotype, and so they assigned those specimens to the new genera Lythrosuchus and Chatterjeea.

In 2005, Sterling Nesbitt noted that "ctenosauriscids" such as Arizonasaurus, Bromsgroveia, and Lotosaurus shared many similarities with "poposaurids" such as Poposaurus, Sillosuchus, and "Chatterjeea" (now known as Shuvosaurus). He proposed that they formed a clade (informally named "Group X") to the exception of other pseudosuchians.

"Group X" was formally given the name "Poposauroidea" by Jonathan C. Weinbaum and Axel Hungerbühler in 2007. In their paper, Weinbaum and Hungerbühler described two new skeletons of Poposaurus and incorporated several new characters of the genus into a phylogenetic analysis. Poposauroidea was recovered as a monophyletic grouping, while other rauisuchians (namely Rauisuchidae and Prestosuchidae) were placed as basal forms of a new group called Paracrocodyliformes.

Brusatte et al. (2010) conducted a phylogenetic study of archosaurs that resulted in a grouping referred to as Poposauroidea. Unlike many recent studies, they found Rauisuchia to be monophyletic, consisting of two major clades: Rauisuchoidea and Poposauroidea. The monophyly of Rauisuchia was not strongly supported in the analysis of Brusatte et al. They noted that if their tree was enlarged by one step, Poposauroidea fell outside Rauisuchia to become the sister group of Ornithosuchidae, which is thought to closely related to, but outside, Rauisuchia. In their tree, Poposauroidea included genera usually classified as poposauroids as well as several other genera that were not previously placed in the group. One of these genera, Qianosuchus, is unique among pseudosuchians in its semiaquatic lifestyle.

In his massive revision of archosaurs which included a large cladistic analysis, Sterling J. Nesbitt (2011) found Xilousuchus to be a poposauroid most closely related to Arizonasaurus. Nesbitt's analysis did not recover a monophyletic Rauisuchia or monophyletic Rauisuchoidea. Poposauroidea was found to be monophyletic, and more resolved than in previous analyses, with Qianosuchus as the most basal member of the group and Lotosaurus grouping with shuvosaurids instead of ctenosauriscids. The cladogram below follows Nesbitt (2011) with clade names based on previous studies.

- Poposauroidea
  - Qianosuchus
  - - Ctenosauriscidae
      - Arizonasaurus
      - Xilousuchus
    - - Poposauridae
        - Poposaurus
      - - Lotosauridae
          - Lotosaurus
        - Shuvosauridae
          - Sillosuchus
          - - Effigia
            - Shuvosaurus
