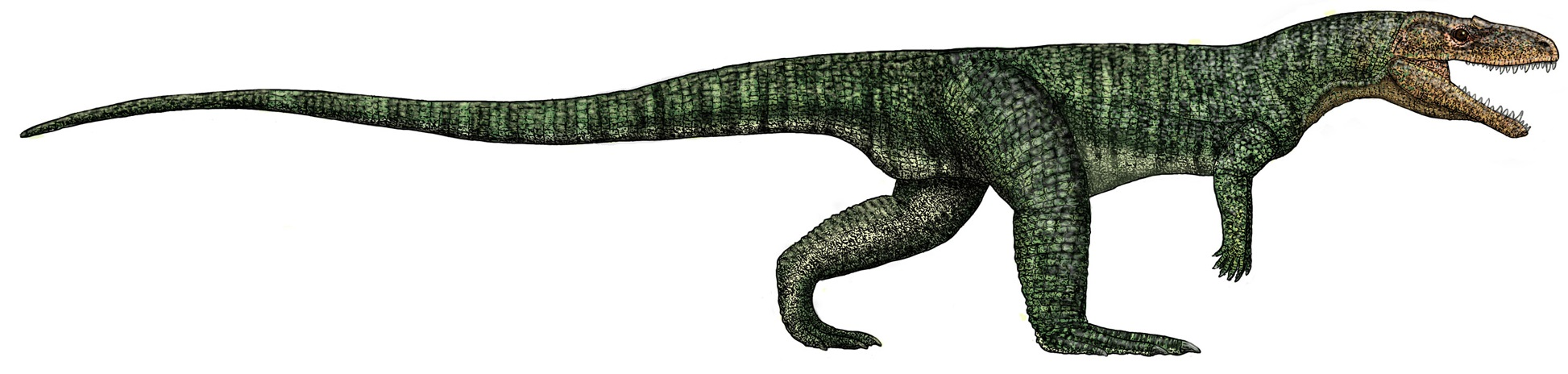
- Poposaurus gracilis, a poposauroid
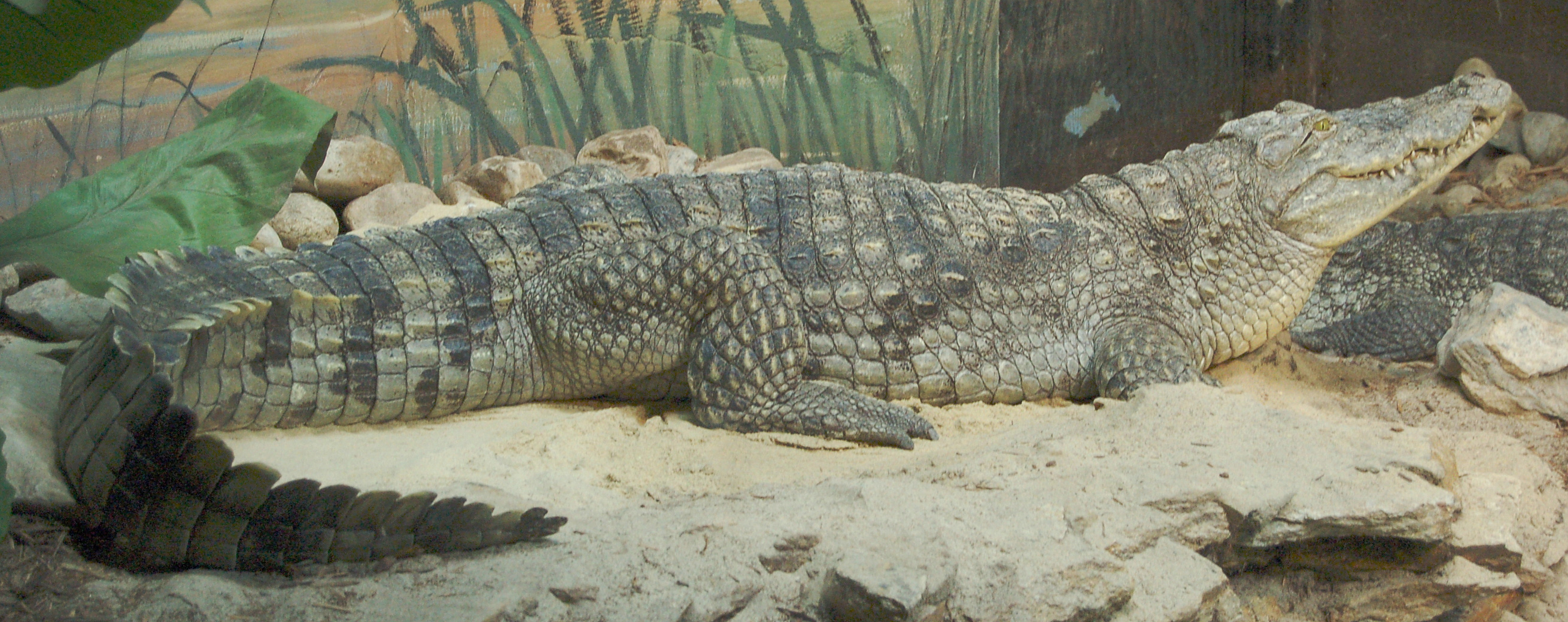
- Crocodylus niloticus, a loricatan

Scientific classification
- Kingdom: Animalia
- Phylum: Chordata
- Class: Reptilia
- Clade: Pseudosuchia
- Clade: Suchia
- Clade: Paracrocodylomorpha; Parrish, 1993

Subtaxa
- †Mambawakale; †Shakajlura; †Smok; †Stagonosuchus; †Vytshegdosuchus; †Poposauroidea; Loricata

= Paracrocodylomorpha =

Paracrocodylomorphs Temporal range: Early Triassic – Holocene, 247–0 Ma

Clade of reptiles

Paracrocodylomorpha is a clade of pseudosuchian archosaurs. The clade includes the diverse and unusual group Poposauroidea as well as the generally carnivorous and quadrupedal members of Loricata, including modern crocodylians. Paracrocodylomorpha was named by paleontologist J. Michael Parrish in 1993, although the group is now considered to encompass more reptiles than his original definition intended. The most recent definition of Paracrocodylomorpha, as defined by Sterling Nesbitt in 2011, is "the least inclusive clade containing Poposaurus and Crocodylus niloticus (the Nile crocodile). Most groups of paracrocodylomorphs became extinct at the end of the Triassic period, with the exception of the crocodylomorphs, from which crocodylians such as crocodiles and alligators evolved in the latter part of the Mesozoic.

== History and definition ==
Parrish (1993) defined Paracrocodylomorpha as the last common ancestor of "Poposauridae" and Crocodylomorpha and all of its descendants. He believed that Poposaurus and its allies were among the closest relatives of crocodylomorphs. Therefore, his definition was intended to exclude various groups of heavily-built Triassic pseudosuchians, collectively known as "rauisuchians". Weinbaum & Hungerbühler (2007) hypothesized that the relations of Pseudosuchians were reversed to those hypothesized by Parrish. They claimed that "rauisuchians" such as Postosuchus, Batrachotomus, and Saurosuchus were closer to crocodylians than Poposaurus was. They erected a subgroup within Paracrocodylomorpha which they called Paracrocodyliformes. This subgroup contained all pseudosuchians closer to those three "rauisuchians" (as well as the Nile crocodile) rather than Poposaurus.

Nesbitt (2011) introduced the most recent and common definition of Paracrocodylomorpha in his broad phylogenetic analysis. His results supported Weinbaum & Hungerbühler (2007)'s claim that "rauisuchians" were closer to crocodylians than Poposaurus was. In fact, he found that crocodylomorphs were actually descended from the "rauisuchian" group, thus rendering "Rauisuchia" a paraphyletic grade of various reptiles leading to crocodylomorphs. Moreover, the name "Paracrocodyliformes" used by Weinbaum & Hungerbühler (2007) was assigned a new name, Loricata.

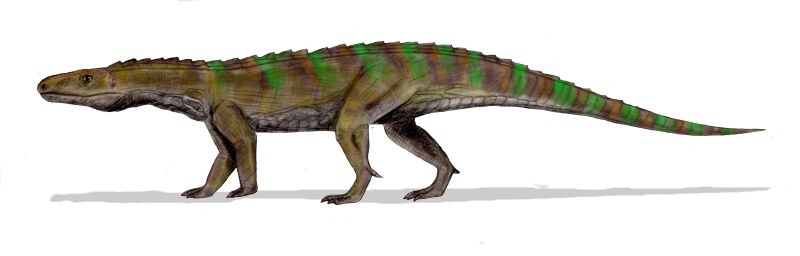
Ticinosuchus, the sister taxon to paracrocodylomorphs under Nesbitt (2011)'s methodologies

The name "Paracrocodylomorpha" was re-defined by Nesbitt in his study, reacquiring a name similar to its original usage by Parrish (1993). Nesbitt found that poposauroids formed the sister group to loricatans, and that the clade encompassing poposauroids and loricatans required a new name. Therefore, he used Paracrocodylomorpha to connect Poposaurus and Crocodylus, and all descendants of their common ancestor. Unlike Parrish's vision for the clade, Nesbitt's Paracrocodylomorpha included the "rauisuchians", which were members of Loricata. The only "rauisuchian" not found to belong to Paracrocodylomorpha with absolute confidence was the former "prestosuchid" Ticinosuchus. Nesbitt found that his most parsimonious results indicated that this genus was the sister taxon of the paracrocodylomorphs, rather than an internal component of the group. However, due to its crushed skeleton obscuring crucial anatomical details, it is also conceivable that Ticinosuchus may actually belong inside Paracrocodylomorpha pending new info. This result has already been recovered by Da-Silva et al. (2019), which places Ticinosuchus as the basalmost loricatan while also sometimes having the recently described suchian Mandasuchus lie outside of the group.

== Description ==
=== Unambiguous synapomorphies ===
Under Nesbitt (2011)'s revised interpretation of the clade's components, only two unambiguous synapomorphies (derived distinguishing traits) were found for Paracrocodylomorpha. The tip of each pubis (forward-pointing hip bone) expands into a structure known as a pubic boot. In addition, metatarsal II (the foot bone which connects to the second-innermost toe) is at least as long if not longer than metatarsal IV (the foot bone which connects to the outermost toe). More basal pseudosuchians such as aetosaurs, ornithosuchids, Gracilisuchus, and Ticinosuchus lack these two traits.

=== Ambiguous synapomorphies ===
'Pillar-erect' hip joints (right) may have evolved at the base of Paracrocodylomorpha, or in an earlier common ancestor with aetosaurs

Various paracrocodylomorphs share a few other derived traits, although it is not entirely clear if these features evolved precisely at the base of Paracrocodylomorpha and thus characterize the group. Some of these traits cannot be proven or disproven to exist in the crushed skeleton of Ticinosuchus. If they are present in Ticinosuchus, they evolved prior to Paracrocodylomorpha, but if not present in that genus, they can also be considered to be synapomorphies for Paracrocodylomorpha.

For example, the inner face of the jaw joint possesses a spur that projects downwards and inwards in loricatans and basal poposauroids, although this trait is unknown in Ticinosuchus and lost in advanced poposauroids such as Poposaurus and shuvosaurids. A similar trait is the fact that the ilium (upper hip plate) leans outwards. This forces the acetabulum (hip socket) to face downwards, leading to a 'pillar-erect' hip posture. This posture is well known in loricatans (apart from sprawling crocodylomorphs) and basal poposauroids, but it is also known in aetosaurs. Aetosaurs may have acquired this posture independently, but if not, it cannot be considered a synapomorphy of Paracrocodylomorpha. Advanced poposauroids lack an outward-leaning ilium, but also possess a specialized supraacetabular crest which forces the acetabulum to face downward, resulting in the retention of a 'pillar-erect' posture. Some paracrocodylomorphs also have a pubis which contacts the ischium (rear-pointing hip bone) only slightly compared to earlier pseudosuchians. In poposauroids other than Qianosuchus and Lotosaurus, this trait is exaggerated to the point that the two bones don't even touch each other.

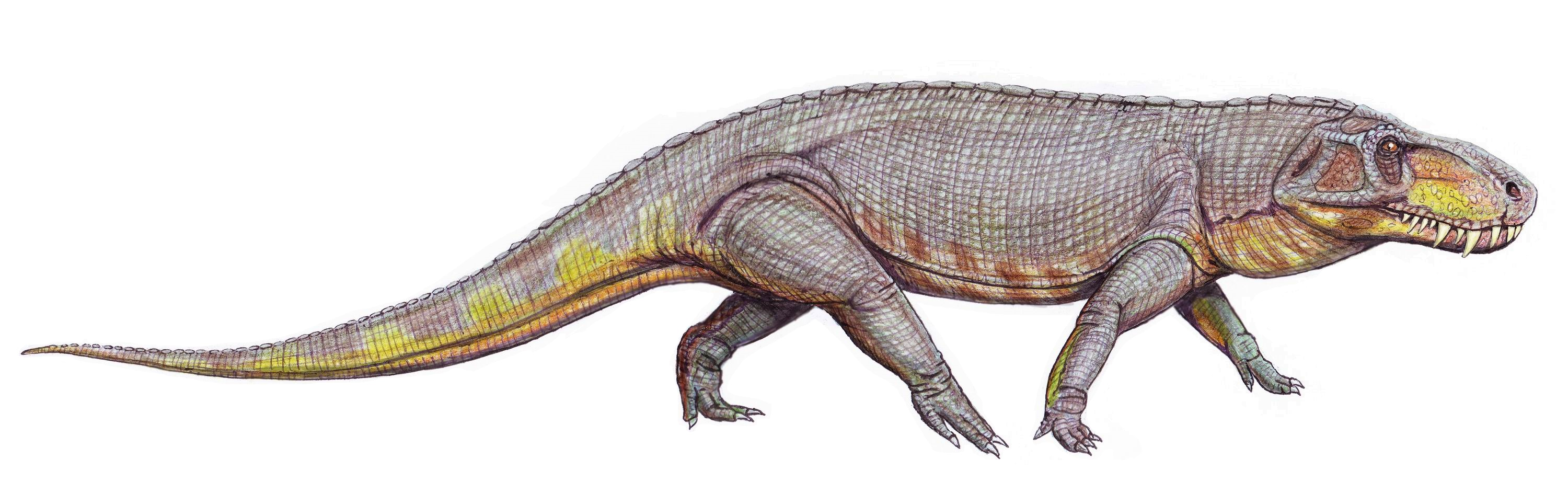
Prestosuchus, a basal loricatan likely very similar to the ancestral paracrocodylomorph

Various paracrocodylomorphs possess a pit on the snout, between the premaxilla and maxilla bones. This pit, termed a 'subnarial foramen' was found by Nesbitt (2011) to be present only in loricatans at least as derived as Batrachotomus. However, a restudy of Prestosuchus by Da-Silvia et al. (2016) showed that the pit was present in basal loricatans as well as poposauroids. They proposed that a subnarial foramen may have been an additional synapomorphy of Paracrocodylomorpha, although it is unknown in Ticinosuchus.

The proximal portion of the femur (thigh bone) in some paracrocodylomorphs also possessed derived features compared to earlier taxa. Like many other archosaurs, the femoral head is tilted about 45 degrees outwards and backwards. The inner/rear face of the head possesses two large bumps (tubera), one more inward than the other. In non-paracrocodylomorph pseudosuchians, the more outward/rearward one (the posteromedial tuber) is larger, but in poposauroids and most loricatans, they are equal in size. However, Prestosuchus, one of the most basal loricatans, had a larger posteromedial tuber. Nevertheless, even more basal loricatans such as Mandasuchus had tubera of equal sizes, indicating that the situation in Prestosuchus was an anomaly. The femoral head may also have possessed a straight groove on its upper side in the earliest paracrocodylomorphs. This final trait is known in poposauroids and a few loricatans more basal than Fasolasuchus, but it is also unknown in Ticinosuchus and present in Nundasuchus so it may have predated Paracrocodylomorpha.

== Phylogeny ==
According to Parrish (1993), this clade was nested within Rauisuchia, a group of crurotarsans that once included only extinct Triassic forms but is now generally regarded as paraphyletic. Rauisuchia traditionally included the families Rauisuchidae and Poposauridae to the exclusion of Crocodylomorpha, but Parrish found Poposauridae more closely related to Crocodylomorpha than to Rauisuchidae. This close relationship was recognized since the 1980s. The genus Gracilisuchus was also found to be a close relative of crocodylomorphs and poposaurids but was not placed within Paracrocodylomorpha. Below is a cladogram showing the phylogenetic relationships in Parrish's 1993 study:

- Crurotarsi
  - Ornithosuchidae
  - Crocodylotarsi
    - Parasuchia
    - Suchia
      - Prestosuchidae
      - Rauisuchiformes
        - Aetosauria
        - Rauisuchia
          - Rauisuchidae
          - - Gracilisuchus
            - Paracrocodylomorpha
              - Poposauridae
              - Crocodylomorpha

However, more recent analyses have doubted the idea that poposaurids (and by extension other poposauroids) were grouped with crocodylians to the exception of other groups. For example, a 2007 phylogenetic study by Weinbaum & Hungerbühler, found the rauisuchian families Rauisuchidae and Prestosuchidae to be more closely related to Crocodylomorpha than was Poposauridae. The authors erected the clade Paracrocodyliformes for the clade including Rauisuchidae, Prestosuchidae, and Crocodylomorpha. In addition, several putative poposaurids such as Postosuchus and Teratosaurus were found to be rauisuchids. Sterling J. Nesbitt in 2011 found a similar topology, including Rauisuchidae and "Prestosuchidae" ( the latter of which he found to be polyphyletic) within Paracrocodylomorpha. The closest relative of Paracrocodylmorpha to not qualify as a member of the clade is Ticinosuchus, a large predator once considered to qualify as a prestosuchid. The composition of Paracrocodylomorpha generally follows the analysis of Nesbitt (2011) in other recent studies.

- Archosauria
  - Avemetatarsalia
  - Pseudosuchia
    - Ornithosuchidae
    - Suchia
      - Gracilisuchus
      - Turfanosuchus
      - - Revueltosaurus
        - Aetosauria
      - - Ticinosuchus
        - Paracrocodylomorpha
          - Poposauroidea
          - Loricata
            - Prestosuchus
            - - Saurosuchus
              - - Batrachotomus
                - - Fasolasuchus
                  - - Rauisuchidae
                      - Rauisuchus
                      - - Polonosuchus
                        - Postosuchus
                    - Crocodylomorpha
