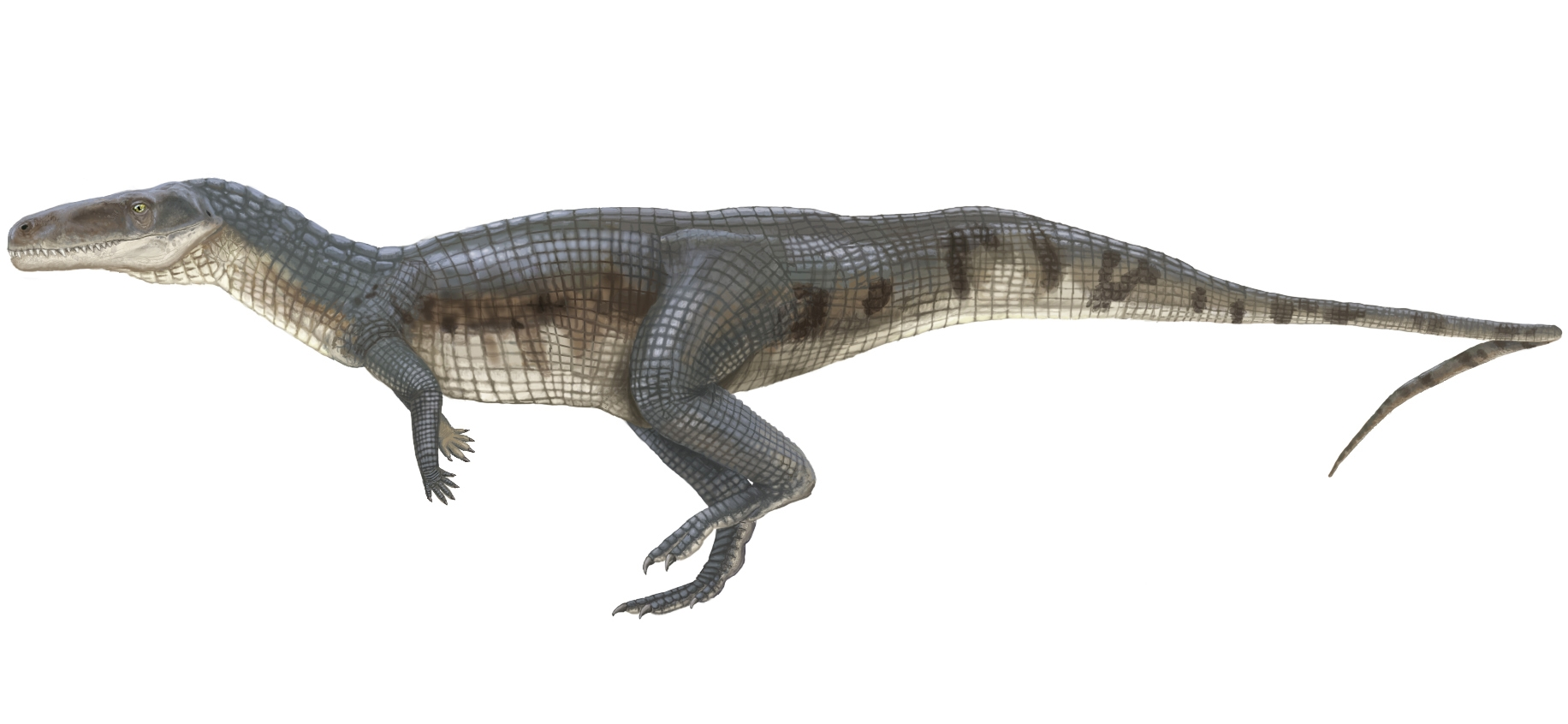
- Poposaurus gracilis

Scientific classification
- Kingdom: Animalia
- Phylum: Chordata
- Class: Reptilia
- Clade: Archosauria
- Clade: Pseudosuchia
- Clade: †Poposauroidea
- Family: †Poposauridae; Nopcsa, 1923

Genera
- †Dolichobrachium; †Poposaurus

= Poposauridae =

Poposauridae Temporal range: Late Triassic

Extinct family of reptiles

Poposauridae is a family of large carnivorous archosaurs which lived alongside dinosaurs during the Late Triassic. They were around 2.5 to 5 metres (8 ft 2 in to 16 ft 5 in) long. Poposaurids are known from fossil remains from North and South America. While originally believed to be theropod dinosaurs (they mirrored the theropods in a number of respects, such as features of the skull and bipedal locomotion), cladistic analysis has shown them to be more closely related to crocodiles.

An early cladistic analysis of crocodylotarsan archosaurs included Poposaurus, Postosuchus, Teratosaurus, and Bromsgroveia within Poposauridae. However, later studies found Teratosaurus to be a rauisuchid. All recent phylogenetic analyses place Postosuchus either as a rauisuchid or a prestosuchid.

== Genera ==
Genus	Status	Age	Location	Description	Images
†Dolichobrachium	Nomen dubium.	Late Triassic	North America		
†Lythrosuchus	Junior synonym.			Junior synonym of Poposaurus	
†Poposaurus	Valid.	Late Triassic	North America.		
