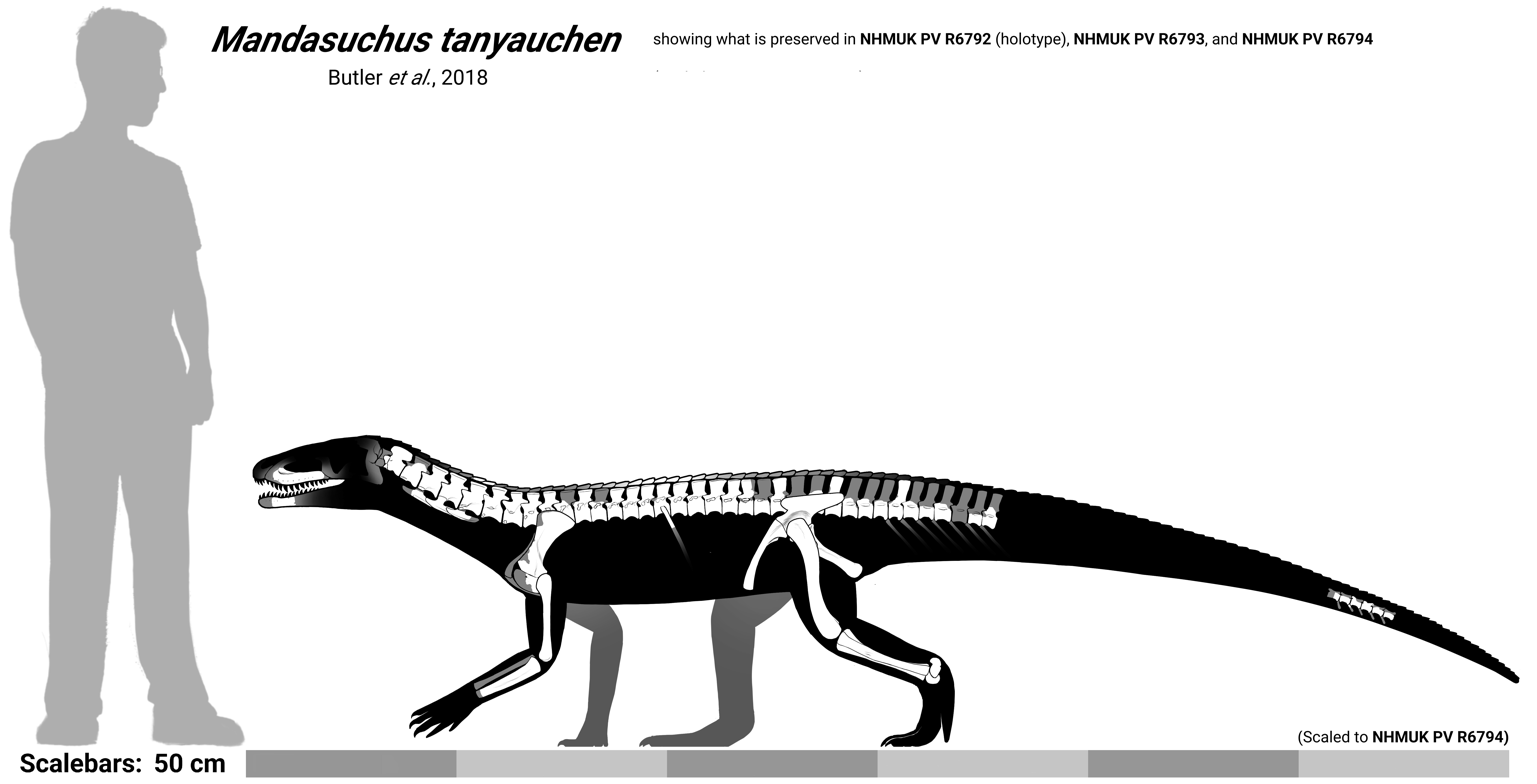
- Skeletal reconstruction of the known remains (in white), silhouette is scaled to the biggest specimen

Scientific classification
- Kingdom: Animalia
- Phylum: Chordata
- Class: Reptilia
- Clade: Archosauria
- Clade: Pseudosuchia
- Clade: Loricata
- Genus: †Mandasuchus; Butler et al., 2018

Type species
- Mandasuchus tanyauchen Butler et al., 2018

= Mandasuchus =

Mandasuchus Temporal range: Anisian ~247–242 Ma

Extinct genus of reptiles

Mandasuchus is an extinct genus of loricatan pseudosuchian from the Manda Formation of Tanzania, which dates back to the Anisian stage of the Middle Triassic. It was a quadrupedal carnivore with a relatively long neck. Although this genus was first mentioned by Alan Charig in 1956, a formal description was not published until 2018.

== History ==
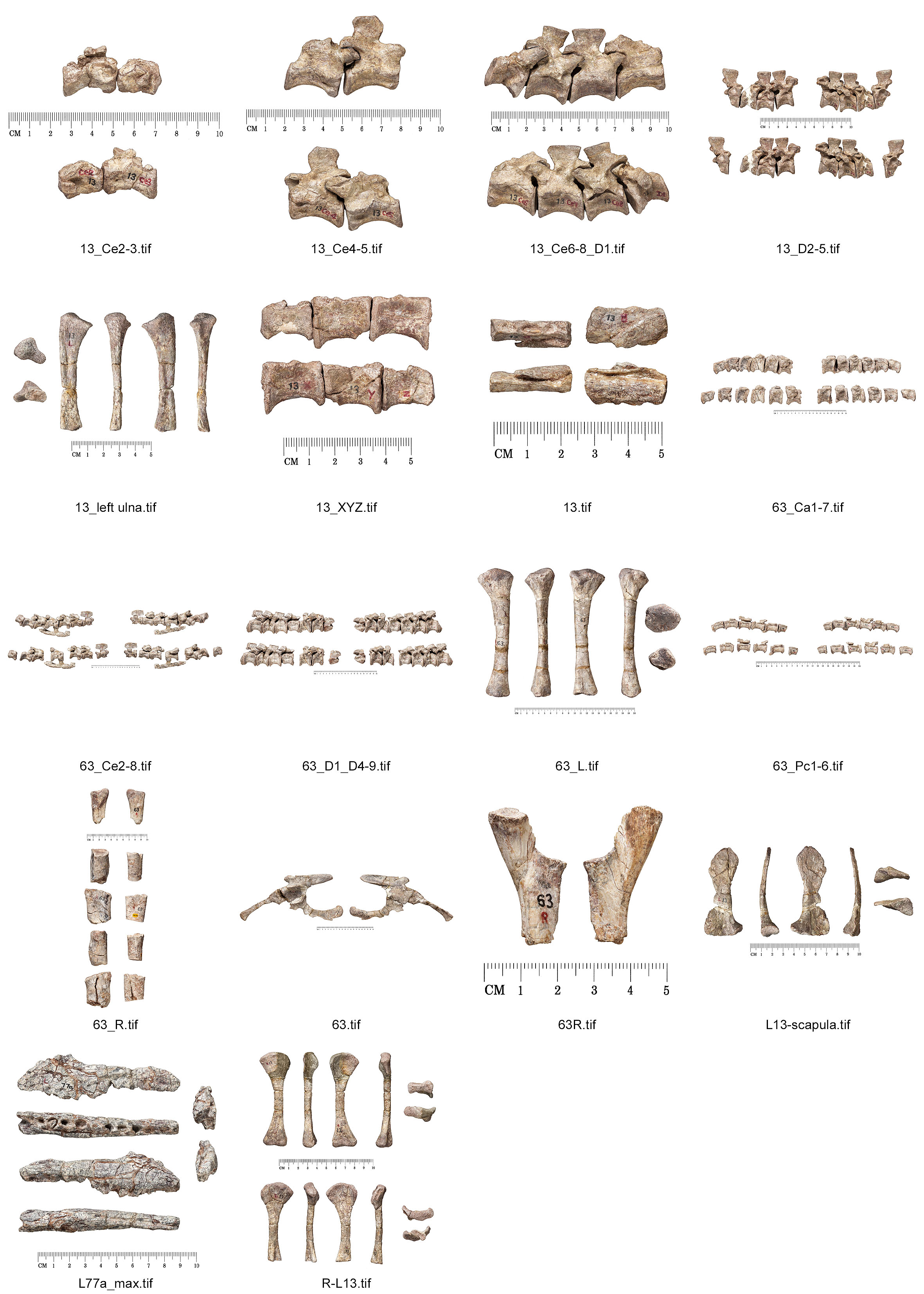
Fossils from referred specimens

The name was first used in a 1956 doctoral dissertation by Alan J. Charig of the University of Cambridge, along with Teleocrater, an archosaur formally named in 2017. Several well preserved specimens have been found, although there is little cranial material.

The family Prestosuchidae was erected in 1967 by Alfred Romer to include Mandasuchus and three other formally named genera of "rauisuchians". Charig and two coauthors suggested in a 1965 study dealing with saurischians that Mandasuchus was a possible ancestor of the "prosauropods" (basal sauropodomorphs), without explanation. In his 1993 study of the phylogeny of Crocodylotarsi (croc-line archosaurs, now known as Pseudosuchia), J. Michael Parrish argued that Mandasuchus was not a distinct genus. He proposed that it was in the same genus as the European archosaur Ticinosuchus ferox due to the similarity of some homologous postcranial bones, but withheld final taxonomic determination of Mandasuchus until Charig provided a published description of the material. However, Charig died in 1997 without publishing on many of the archosaurs he discovered. Mandasuchus was finally formally described in 2018 by Richard J. Butler and colleagues, as part of a multinational investigation into the fossils of Triassic rift systems in Tanzania and Zambia. A phylogenetic analysis recovered it as a loricatan more basal than Prestosuchus and not synonymous with Ticinosuchus, albeit not too distantly related either.

== Description ==
=== Skull ===
Skull material for Mandasuchus is limited to maxillae and part of a dentary. The maxilla is low, with an elongated antorbital fenestra and at least 12 tooth sockets separated by discrete interdental plates. The antorbital fenestra is surrounded by an inset basin, the antorbital fossa, as with other archosaurs. However, Mandasuchus has a restricted and weakly differentiated antorbital fossa compared to other loricatans and Ticinosuchus. The ascending (or dorsal) process of the maxilla, which lies in front of the antorbital fenestra, is short and very thin. This process is also uniquely diagonally oriented when seen from above, with its rear edge set inwards from the front edge. The only preserved tooth is thin and serrated. The dentary fragment is incomplete, but seemingly slender and similar to the maxilla.

=== Postcrania ===
The centrum (main spool-shaped component) of Mandasuchus's longest cervical (neck) vertebrae are about 1.8 times longer than high. This is similar to Ticinosuchus and intermediate between other loricatans (which have shorter vertebrae) and poposauroids (which have longer vertebrae). Smaller specimens have slightly shorter cervical vertebrae. The lower edge and sides of the cervicals are concave while the rib facets (dia- and parapophyses) and articular processes (pre- and post-zygapophyses) are stout. A long ridge runs along the base of the neural spine while smaller ridges connect the articular processes to the front and rear edges of the neural spines, defining deep pockets in the process. The neural spines themselves are short and expanded at their upper extent to form "spine tables", with those near the shoulder resembling rearward-pointed teardrops when seen from above. Cervical ribs are thick and slightly contact each other. Dorsal (back) vertebrae are taller, wider, and their parapophyses gradually shift upwards, but dorsals are otherwise similar to the cervicals. Dorsal neural spines overhang the rear of their respective vertebrae and possess elliptical spine tables. The single known sacral (hip) vertebra is small, simple, and poorly preserved, but it seems to retain a small rear pocket. The caudal (tail) vertebrae gradually lengthen and simplify down the tail, they gain chevrons starting at the fifth caudal, and their neural spines gradually shorten. The neural spines have small spine tables, less distinct than those of the cervicals and dorsals. Osteoderms (bony plates) extended down the back in two rows which were "staggered". i.e. offset from each other so that the armor is asymmetrical. Individual osteoderms were short, thick, and overlapped the pointed front extent of succeeding osteoderms.

The scapula expands towards its upper extremity (more so than Ticinosuchus) and has concave front and rear edges. A small muscle scar is present on the rear edge near the glenoid (shoulder socket), similar to one observed in Batrachotomus, albeit less distinct. The humerus is narrow and has prominent and well-developed muscle attachments, while the ulna is shorter and quite robust.

The ilium is low and similar to that of Ticinosuchus, with muscle scars for two sacral ribs on its inner surface and no vertical ridge on its outer surface. The pubis is somewhat elongated, with its base forming part of the acetabulum and possessing a small perforation known as an obturator fenestra. The tip of the pubis slightly expands into a bulbous pubic boot resembling that of other basal loricatans. The ischium is only slightly shorter than the pubis and also possesses a three-dimensional expansion at its tip. Although the left and right ischia would have contact each other extensively like those of Ticinosuchus and paracrocodylomorphs, this contact was apparently weak enough that the bones were separated during fossilization.

The femur has many archosaurian hallmarks near the hip, such as enlarged proximal tuberosities, a mound-like fourth trochanter, and possibly a groove on the upper surface of the femoral head. It also possessed a scar for the iliofemoralis muscle and a distinct oval pit on its rear edge, which is not known in other pseudosuchians. The tibia is straight and possesses typical pseudosuchian features, while the incomplete fibula has a knob-shaped iliofibularis scar in its upper half. Although no foot bones are preserved, Mandasuchus does have two well-preserved proximal tarsals (ankle bones): the astragalus and calcaneum. Mandasuchus has a "crocodile-normal" or "crurotarsal" ankle, with a prominent peg on the astragalus fitting into a shallower pit on the calcaneum. The ankle has many suchian features, including a flexed (albeit indistinct) tibial facet on the astragalus, and a wide, expanded calcaneal tuber offset from the calcaneum's contact with the fourth distal tarsal.
