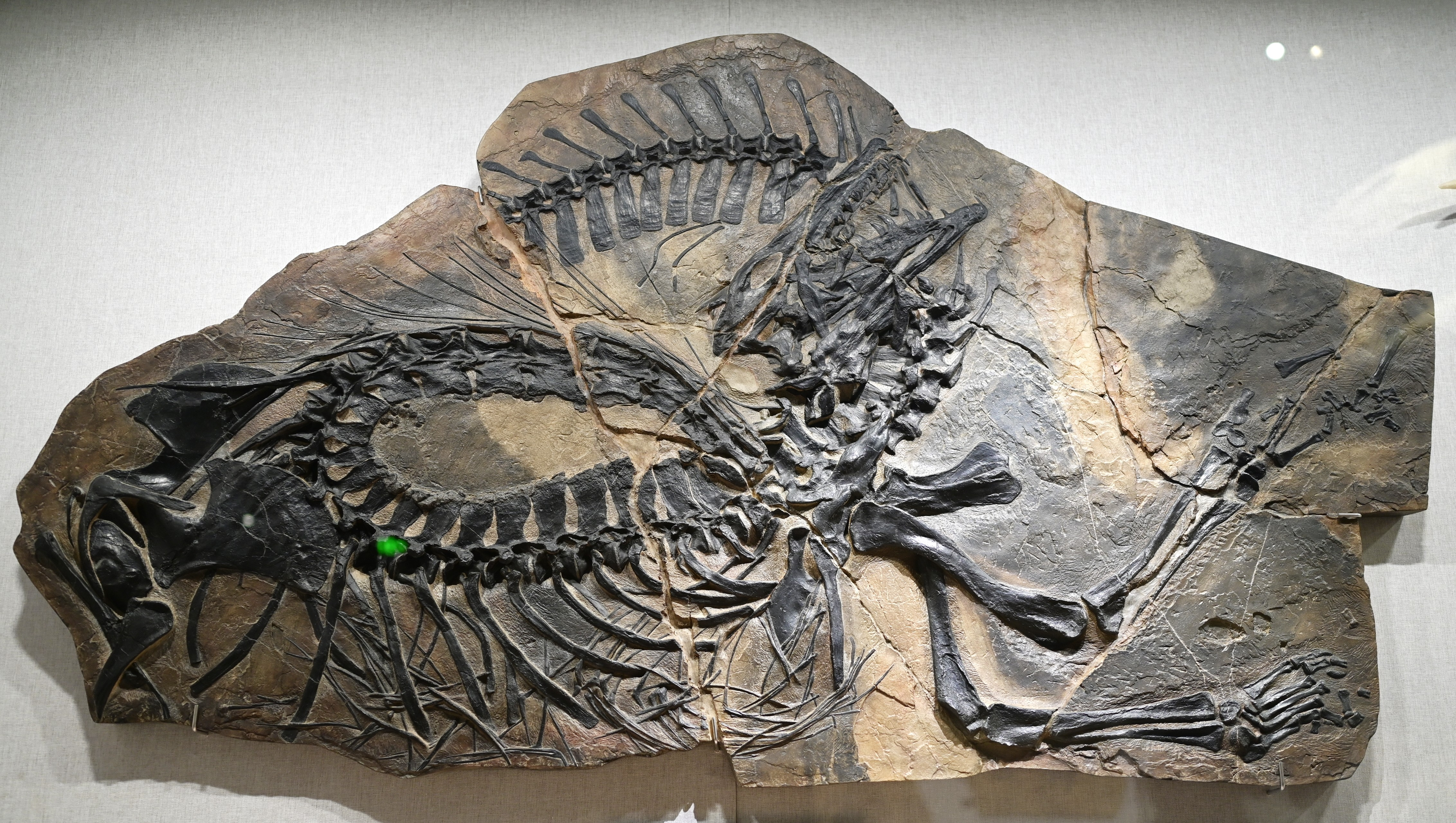
- Cast of Q. mixtus holotype skeleton (IVPP V13899), Baoding Natural History Museum
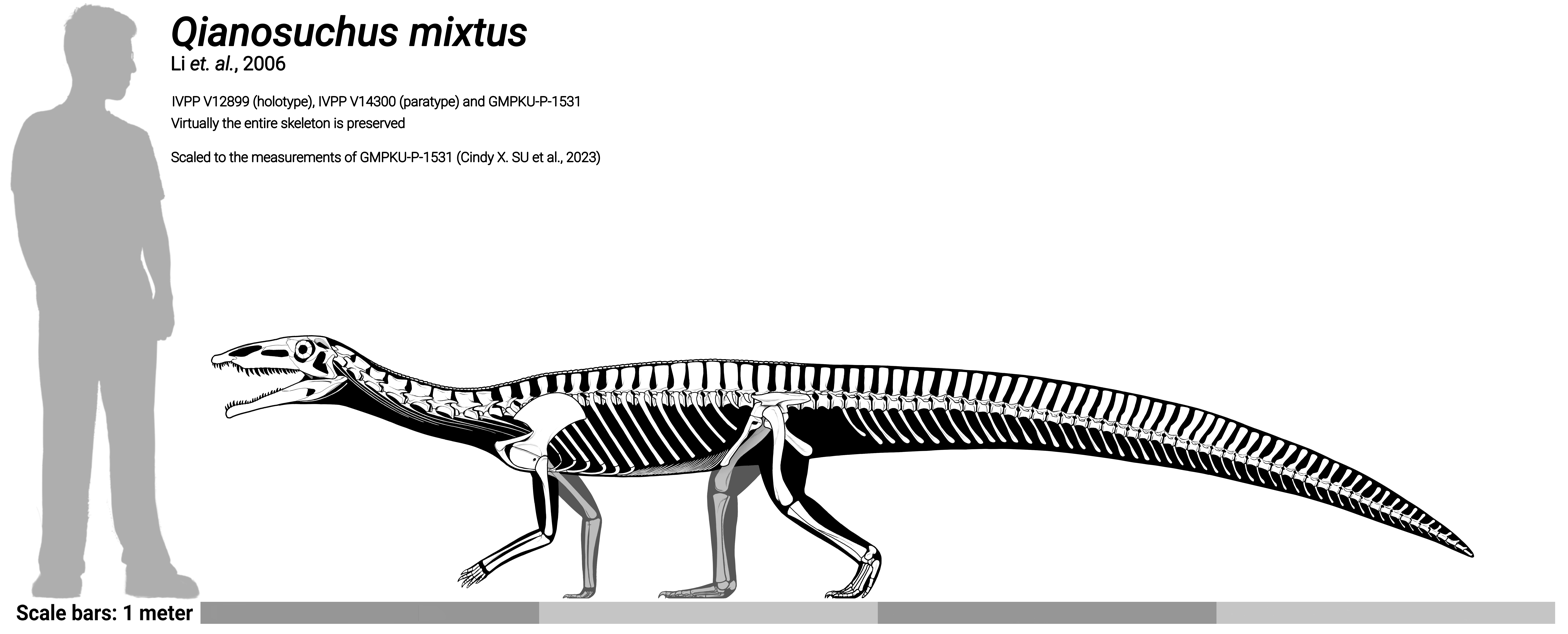
- Skeletal reconstruction and size comparison

Scientific classification
- Kingdom: Animalia
- Phylum: Chordata
- Class: Reptilia
- Clade: Pseudosuchia
- Clade: Suchia
- Clade: Paracrocodylomorpha
- Clade: †Poposauroidea
- Genus: †Qianosuchus; Li C. et al., 2006

Species
- Q. mixtus Li C. et al., 2006 (type)

= Qianosuchus =

Qianosuchus Temporal range: Middle Triassic, Anisian

Extinct genus of reptiles

Qianosuchus is an extinct genus of aquatic poposauroid archosaur from the middle Triassic (Anisian) Guanling Formation of Pan County, China. It is represented by two nearly complete skeletons and a crushed skull preserved in the limestone. Qianosuchus was more than 3 metres long, and had several skeletal adaptations which indicate a semi-marine lifestyle, similar to modern-day saltwater crocodiles. These adaptations have not been seen in any other archosaur from the Triassic.

== Description ==
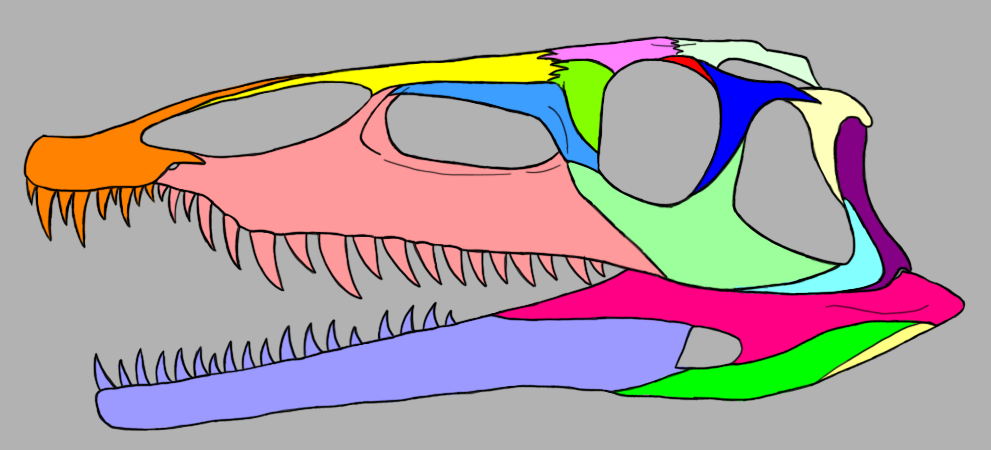
Color-coded diagram of the skull: Premaxilla Maxilla Nasal Lacrimal Prefrontal Frontal Jugal Postorbital Postfrontal / Pareital Squamosal Quadrate Quadratojugal Surangular / Articular Prearticular Angular Dentary

Paratype skeleton (IVPP V14300), National Natural History Museum of China

Qianosuchus possessed an elongated snout. The rostrum formed by the premaxilla is shallow at the front of the skull but deepens posteriorly. Each premaxilla has nine long teeth, and the maxillae bear eighteen teeth each. All the teeth are laterally compressed, curved backwards and serrated, like those of most other carnivorous archosaurs. The nares are expanded and elongated and almost collide with the antorbital fenestrae, meaning that the septum (bony wall) between them is thin and lightweight. Unusually, the jugal forms no part of the border of the antorbital fenestra. Each orbit had a large and well-developed scleral ring in it, which would have reinforced the eyeball under pressure when Qianosuchus was diving. The frontal bones have deep fossae (depressions) on their upper surface, which stretch backwards to the sutures with the parietals. Another such fossa is present between the two parietals themselves. The dentary turns down very slightly at the tip; a specimen described in 2023 shows that it possessed 22 teeth on each side of the lower jaw. The hyoid bones are long and slender, with slightly expanded ends. Qianosuchus had nine cervical, fifteen dorsal, two sacral and more than fifty caudal vertebrae with large neural spines, giving it an unusually long and expanded tail. The neural spines grow taller posteriorly (further down the tail), making the caudal vertebrae tall. The first 23 caudal vertebrae have transverse processes, but these processes are lost further back. The vertebral centra grow shorter posteriorly, making the tail more flexible than the neck. Many of the anterior caudal vertebrae have long chevron bones ventral to them which also increase the height of the tail. The osteoderms are very small and numerous, and they are only present on top of the neck and torso, precluding their subsequent disappearance in later poposauroids. The cervical ribs are extremely elongate and thin, at least four times the length of their corresponding centra, and may have had strong muscles attached enabling it to create suction in its throat while lunging forward at prey by expanding the oesophagus. The dorsal ribs are expanded and pachyostotic at their distal ends. Qianosuchus' scapulae were thin, and had an extremely broad dorsal blade. Its coracoid bones were oval-shaped and quite thin, while its clavicles articulated almost at right angles with the interclavicle to form an L-shaped outline from the side. The forelimbs were slender and lightly built, and almost totally straight, and the specimen described in 2023 shows diminute metacarpals and manual phalanges

The pelvic girdle is similar to that of closely related but more terrestrial archosaurs, with the large posterior process and small anterior process on the ilium, which also possessed a prominent crest of bone above the acetabulum, characteristic of poposauroids. The pubis had a deep foramen close to the proximal end, while the distal end of the thinner and shorter ischium was slightly expanded. The femur was weakly sigmoid, and the fibula and tibia were almost exactly the same length. The calcaneum had a hemicylindrical condyle and a broad calcaneal tuber, while the astragalus had a convex facet for the tibia. Five metatarsals and two tarsals are known, with the fifth metatarsal hooked, as in many other archosauromorphs.

== Paleobiology ==
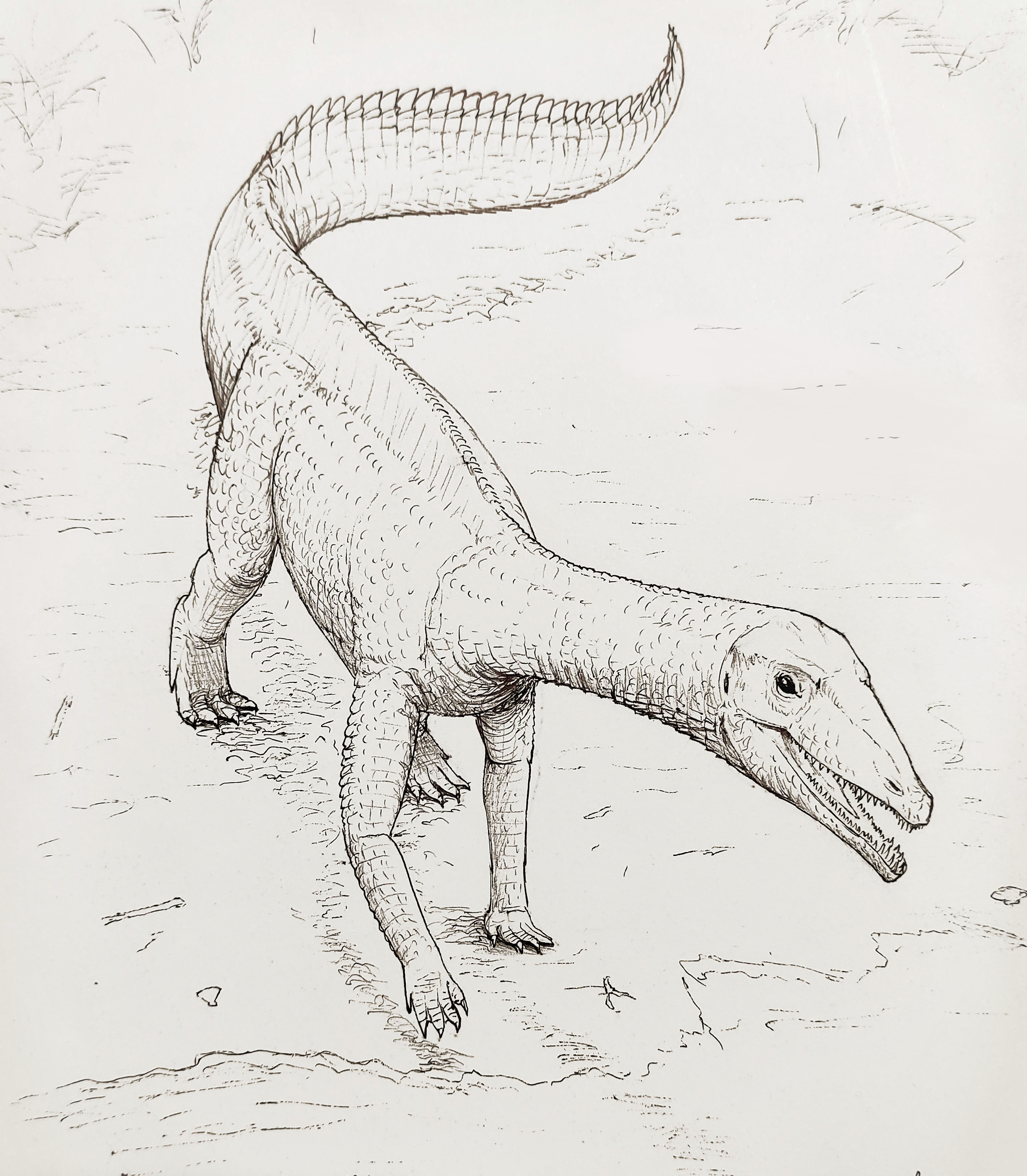
Life restoration, pen on paper.

Qianosuchus was well adapted to a semi-marine lifestyle, with a long, laterally compressed tail and tall neural spines providing a greater surface area, indicating an animal reliant on its undulating tail for propulsion. Its tail is actually more expanded than those of several other marine reptiles such as Hupehsuchus and the modern marine iguana, so Qianosuchus was almost certainly a competent swimmer. The thin scapulae and coracoids are also seen in many marine reptiles such as ichthyosaurs and mosasaurs, while the long neck and reduced dermal armour are seen in marine reptiles such as Tanystropheus. However, its pelvic girdle and large, relatively unspecialized legs would have allowed Qianosuchus to walk around on land as well, and may well have had an erect or semi-erect posture, based on the ankle joint. All this suggests that Qianosuchus lived a semi-aquatic lifestyle in and around the shallow seas where it lived, hunting either on water or on land.
