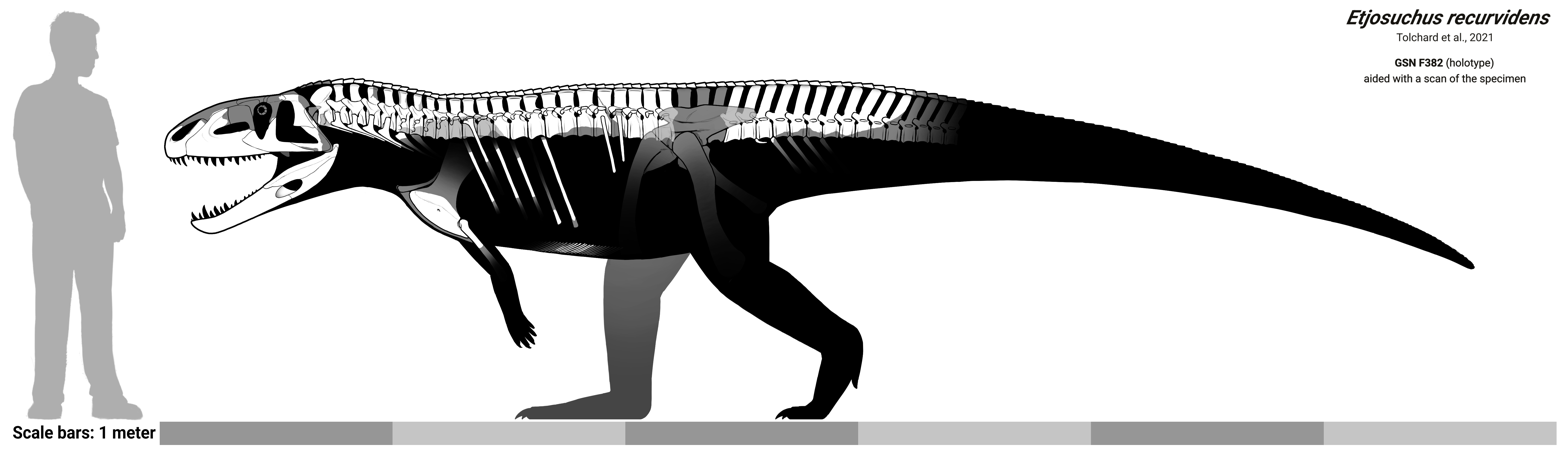
- Skeletal reconstruction and size comparison of Etjosuchus recurvidens, preserved bones in white.
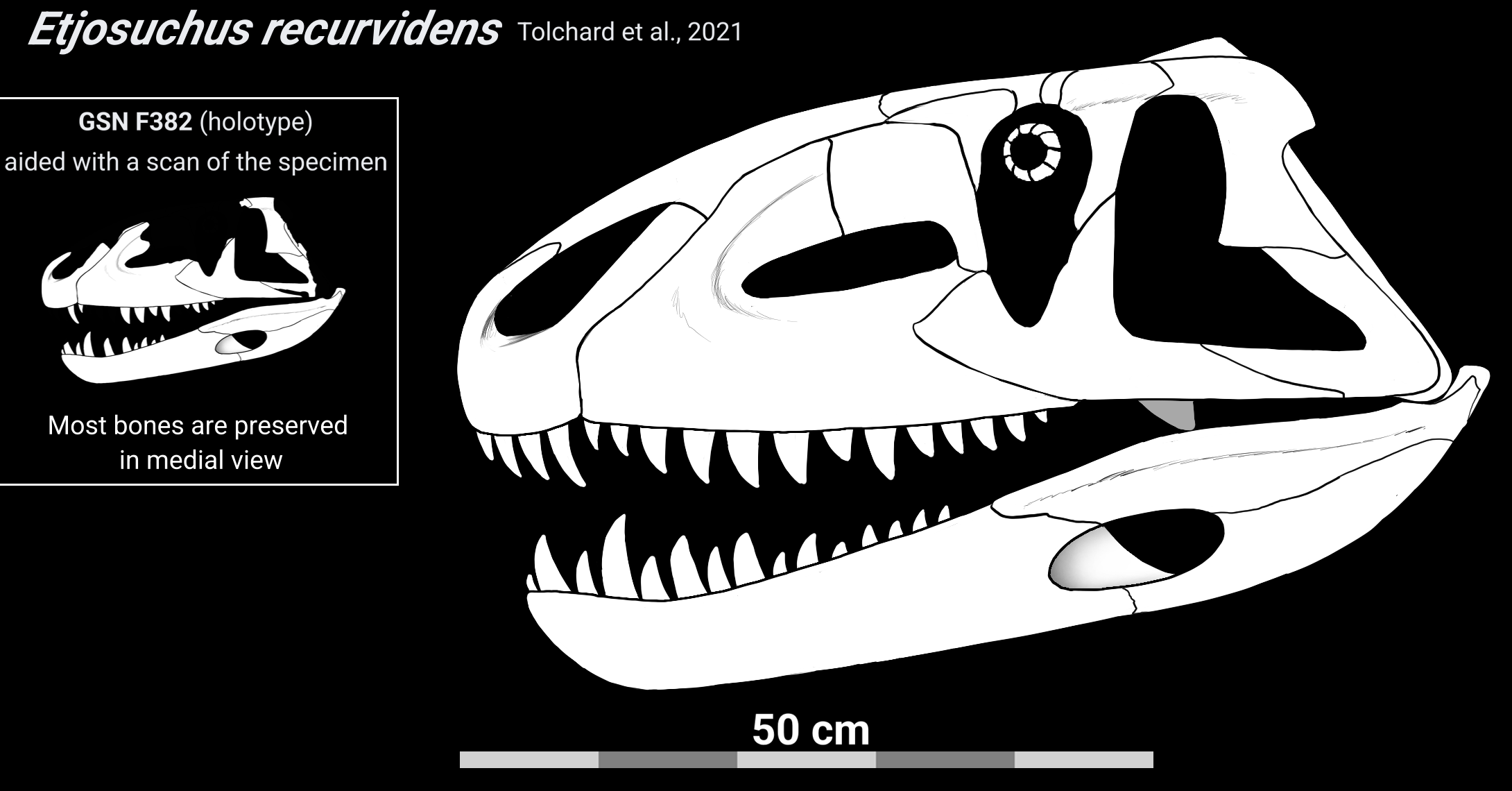
- Skull diagram

Scientific classification
- Kingdom: Animalia
- Phylum: Chordata
- Class: Reptilia
- Clade: Pseudosuchia
- Clade: Loricata
- Genus: †Etjosuchus; Tolchard et al., 2021

Type species
- Etjosuchus recurvidens Tolchard et al., 2021

= Etjosuchus =

Etjosuchus Temporal range: Middle-Late Triassic, Ladinian–Carnian

Extinct genus of pseudosuchians

Etjosuchus is an extinct genus of carnivorous "rauisuchian" (loricatan) archosaur from the Triassic of Namibia. It is known from a single species, Etjosuchus recurvidens, which is based on a partial skeleton from the Ladinian to Carnian-aged Omingonde Formation.

== Discovery and history ==
The holotype of Etjosuchus, GSN F382, was discovered in the early 1990s by Thomas Löffler in outcrops of the Omingonde Formation in the bed of the Omingonde River near Mount Etjo. The specimen comprises a partially complete skeleton, preserving most of the vertebral column in articulation, a coracoid, both partial humeri, articulated cervical ribs, disarticulated dorsal ribs, partial gastralia, many articulated and disarticulated osteoderms, and both lateral halves of the skull and jaws, which are split in half in the sagittal plane. The specimen was figured and provisionally identified as Erythrosuchus africanus by Martin Pickford in 1995, and excavated throughout the course of a study of the formation that released in 2002.

It wasn't until 2021 that a detailed anatomical description of the specimen identified it as a new genus of pseudosuchian. The generic name, Etjosuchus, combines a reference to the discovery of the specimen near Mount Etjo with the Greek word suchus (from the Greek name for the Egyptian god Sobek). The specific name, recurvidens, combines "recurved" with the Latin dens ("tooth"), referencing the morphology of the teeth.

== Description ==
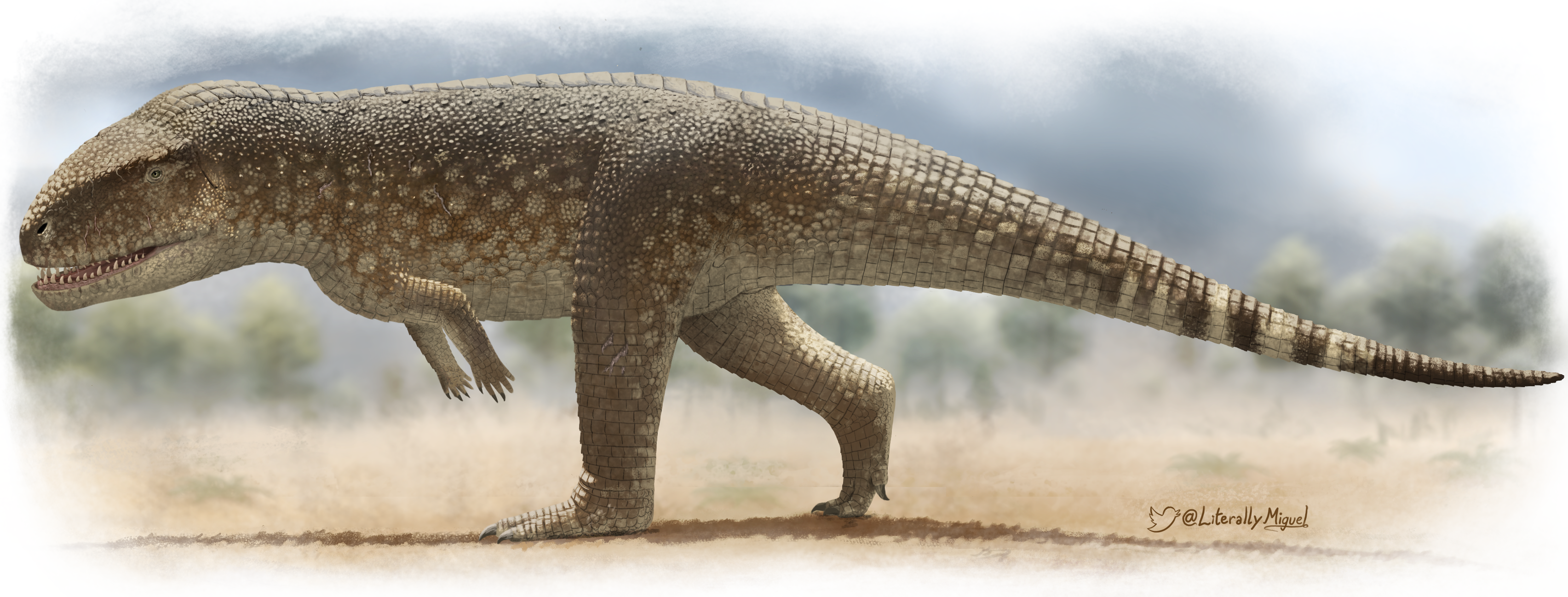
Life reconstruction

Etjosuchus was a large-bodied carnivorous pseudosuchian. Its robust skull is more than 70 centimetres (28 in) long, with sharp, recurved, serrated teeth. While Etjosuchus has proportionately large scapulocoracoids compared to its relatives, the circumference of the preserved partial humeri (and likely the size of its front limbs) are extremely small for its size, with a humeral head width of 65 mm. For reference, Postosuchus kirkpatricki; a smaller bipedal relative, has a humeral head width of 110 mm. As such, Etjosuchus likely walked only on its hind legs, being one of the few loricatans confidently thought to be bipedal.

=== Osteoderms ===
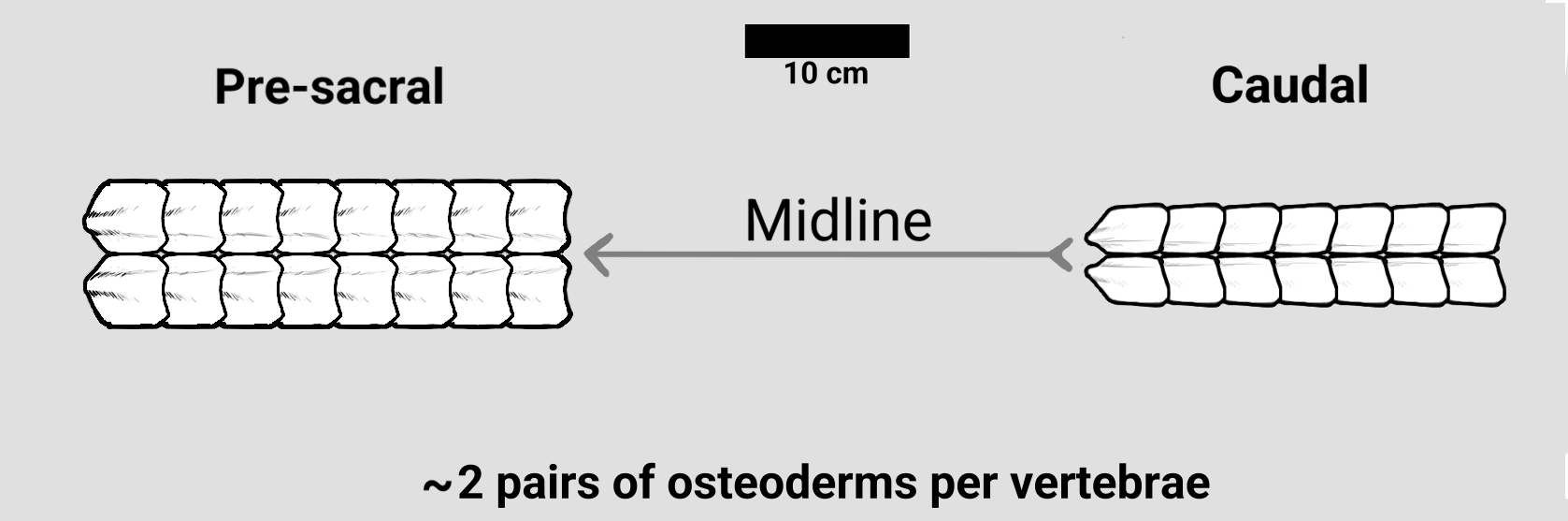
Detail of the articulated dermal armor in dorsal view, osteoderms to scale with each other

As with many other pseudosuchians, Etjosuchus has two rows of osteoderms (dermal bony armor) tightly positioned along the dorsal midline; these were arranged in pairs adjacent to the neural spines across the animal's back, from neck to tail. The shape of each osteoderm is roughly rectangular, with one small anterior projection and two on the posterior, and a slight raised ridge. These closely articulate and overlap on top of each other from front to back. There is roughly two pairs of osteoderms per vertebra, as in many other loricatans like Saurosuchus or Prestosuchus.

== Classification ==
To evaluate the phylogenetic position of Etjosuchus, Tolchard et al. (2021) coded it into a phylogenetic matrix derived from the work of Nesbitt (2011). The phylogenetic analysis was run with several levels of implied weighting (from no weighting to k=1, 3, and 6), a strategy to minimize the effects of homoplasy (convergent evolution). With no weighting, Etjosuchus is resolved as a basal loricatan closer to crocodylomorphs than Luperosuchus, but not as close as a Heptasuchus + Batrachotomus clade. These results are displayed in the cladogram below.

At k=1, its position shifts crownward towards crocodylomorphs, and Etjosuchus may clade with Fasolasuchus and/or Rauisuchus. Increasing the weighting further strengthens a connection with Rauisuchus, crownward of Fasolasuchus. This would indicate that the family Rauisuchidae is a paraphyletic grade rather than a clade; Postosuchus and Polonosuchus—other proposed rauisuchids—were closer to crocodylomorphs than to Rauisuchus in this configuration.

- Loricata
  - Saurosuchus
  - - Prestosuchus chiniquensis
    - - Luperosuchus
      - - Etjosuchus
        - - - Heptasuchus
            - Batrachotomus
          - - Fasolasuchus
            - - - Rauisuchus
                - - Postosuchus alisonae
                  - Postosuchus kirkpatricki
                  - Polonosuchus
              - - Crocodylomorpha
