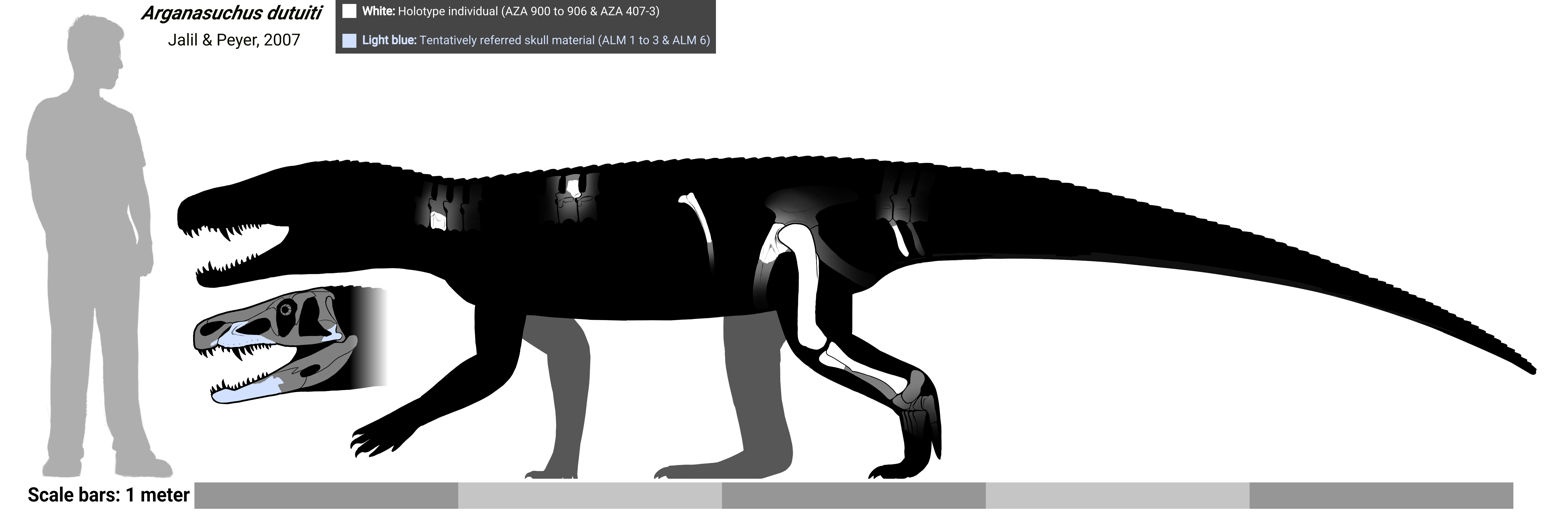
- Skeletal reconstruction of the known remains, including referred specimens
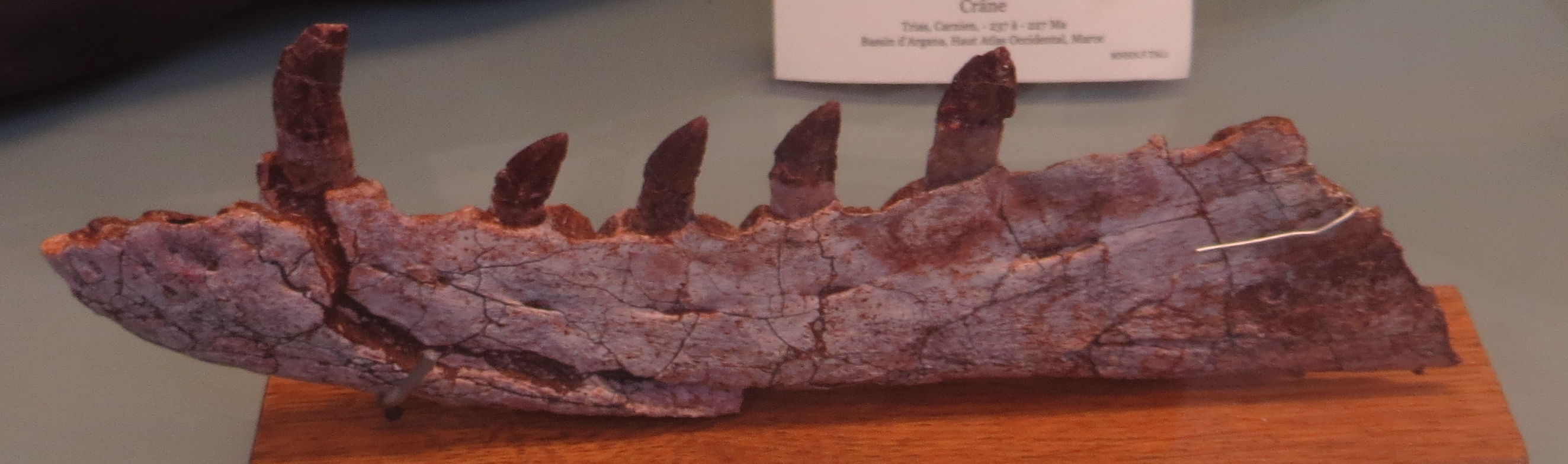
- Left mandible, referred specimen ALM 2

Scientific classification
- Kingdom: Animalia
- Phylum: Chordata
- Class: Reptilia
- Clade: Archosauria
- Clade: Pseudosuchia
- Clade: Loricata
- Genus: †Arganasuchus; Jalil & Peyer, 2007

Type species
- Arganasuchus dutuiti Jalil & Peyer, 2007

= Arganasuchus =

Arganasuchus Temporal range: Carnian

Extinct genus of reptiles

Arganasuchus is an extinct genus of "rauisuchian" (loricatan) archosaur. It is known from a single species, Arganasuchus dutuiti. Fossils of this genus have been found in Upper Triassic rocks of the Argana Basin, Morocco. Though its remains were initially referred to Ticinosuchus when discovered during the 1970s, in 2007 it was identified as a distinct genus with unique features of the pubis and maxilla. Arganasuchus also had several anatomical details in common with Batrachotomus, Fasolasuchus, and Postosuchus, though its relations with other loricatans remains unresolved. Arganasuchus is considered a carnivore due to its large, knife-shaped teeth.

== Discovery ==
Fossils of Arganasuchus were first reported by Jean-Michel Dutuit in 1979, who referred a maxilla, dentary, femur, and fibula to Ticinosuchus. These fossils were found in the lower part of unit T5 (the Irohalene Member) of the Timezgadiouine Formation. This geological formation, which is found in the Argana Basin of Morocco, may have been deposited in the Carnian stage of the Late Triassic period.

Arganasuchus dutuiti was named and described in 2007 by Nour-Eddine Jalil and Karin Peyer. Its name translates to "Dutuit's Argana crocodile" in honor of its discoverer and place of discovery. The genus was based on the holotype AZA 904, a partial pubis bone found at a fossil site near the village of Azarifen. And other postcrania fossils found in close association (and thus, likely from the same individual) include ribs and a chevron (AZA 903-1-3, and 407-1-5), teeth (AZA 408-1-3), a femur (AZA 900), a fibula (AZA 901), part of a cervical vertebra (AZA 902), part of a neural arch (AZA 905), and part of a tibia (AZA 906). Skull bones have been found at a different locale, the Alili n’yifis site near the village of Alma. These skull bones include a maxilla (ALM 1), and several lower jaws (ALM 2, 3, 5, 6, and 7). One of the jaws, ALM 2, connected to a small angled bone tentatively identified as a quadratojugal. The referral of the skull fossils to Arganasuchus is uncertain but likely considering their "rauisuchian" identity and similar size and occurrence.

== Description ==
=== Skull ===
The maxilla has a straight lower edge with at least 12 large, knife-like teeth set in deep sockets and covered by interdental plates. A longitudinal ridge runs along the inner portion of the maxilla and is continuous with a low facet for the palatine bone. This continuity is seemingly unique to Arganasuchus. The maxilla as a whole is Y-shaped like Batrachotomus and Fasolasuchus. It has a long and tapering posterior process (rear branch) and a shorter ascending process (upper branch) separated by a triangular antorbital fenestra which forms a 40 degrees angle. The maxilla also has an unusually long anterior process (forward branch), forming the "stem" of the Y shape. It is uncertain whether the front edge of the maxilla formed part of the naris (like Batrachotomus) or contacted the premaxilla (like other loricatans). The possible quadratojugal fossil is thick and sharply angled, apparently contacting a long jugal but not the quadrate, unlike its relatives. The front of the lower jaw is narrow and taper towards the chin, resembling that of Saurosuchus in most respects. Although the rear of the lower jaw is unknown, enough of the front half was preserved to indicate that at least 14 teeth were present. Arganasuchus has an alternating tooth replacement scheme, like many other archosaurs.

=== Postcrania ===
The single known vertebra is a spool-shaped cervical (neck) centrum with a low keel running along its underside. A partial neural arch is also preserved, though the low inclination of the postzygapophyses indicates that it may belong to a dorsal (back) vertebra. The rib is similar to those of Saurosuchus (thick, two-headed, with a longitudinal ridge) while the chevron is similar to those of Ticinosuchus (thickened at its tip). The pubis is among the most unusual and unique bones in Arganasuchus. The acetabulum (hip socket) expands down the shaft of the pubis and is delineated from the front by a thick ridge which projects out as a tuberosity at its lower extent. The size and orientation of the acetabulum on the pubis is an autapomorphy (unique defining feature) of Arganasuchus. The femur is large and robust, with a prominent knob-like fourth trochanter overlooking a smaller knob which may be an area of diseased bone. The tibia is thick but incomplete while the fibula is thinner and has a pronounced iliofibularis muscle scar almost halfway down its shaft.

== Classification ==
Arganasuchus is universally considered a "rauisuchian", a grouping of large carnivorous pseudosuchians (crocodile-line archosaurs) from the Triassic. However, "Rauisuchia" is currently considered to be a paraphyletic grade of archosaurs incrementally closer to crocodilians, rather than a clade (a natural grouping defined by shared relations). The most recent cladistic interpretations of archosaur classification are mainly inspired by an analysis by Nesbitt (2011). He split "rauisuchians" (relabeled as Paracrocodylomorpha) into two branches: the unusual poposauroids and a more diverse branch called Loricata, which includes crocodylomorphs and ancestral forms like Postosuchus and Saurosuchus. Although most frequently compared with loricatans, Arganasuchus has yet to be properly incorporated into this newer understanding of crocodilian ancestry, and as a result its classification relative to other "rauisuchians" is poorly understood.

The original description by Jalil & Peyer (2007) made many comparisons between the anatomy of Arganasuchus and other loricatans. The shape of the maxilla was similar to Batrachotomus and Fasolasuchus, the vertebrae were similar to Postosuchus, the femur was comparable to Prestosuchus, and the pubis had a few similarities with both Batrachotomus and Postosuchus. The question of Arganasuchus's relations was left unresolved, partly because its describers were aware of the uncertainty within rauisuchian taxonomy as a whole.

Some phylogenetic analyses have attempted to deal with Arganasuchus, although there is no consensus on its precise affinities. Brusatte et al. (2010) found weak support for a small clade of basal "rauisuchoids" (loricatans) containing Arganasuchus, Fasolasuchus, Stagonosuchus, and Ticinosuchus. França et al. (2011) found that Arganasuchus was an unstable "wildcard" taxon in their analysis, though a connection to Decuriasuchus, Prestosuchus, and Batrachotomus was one possibility.
