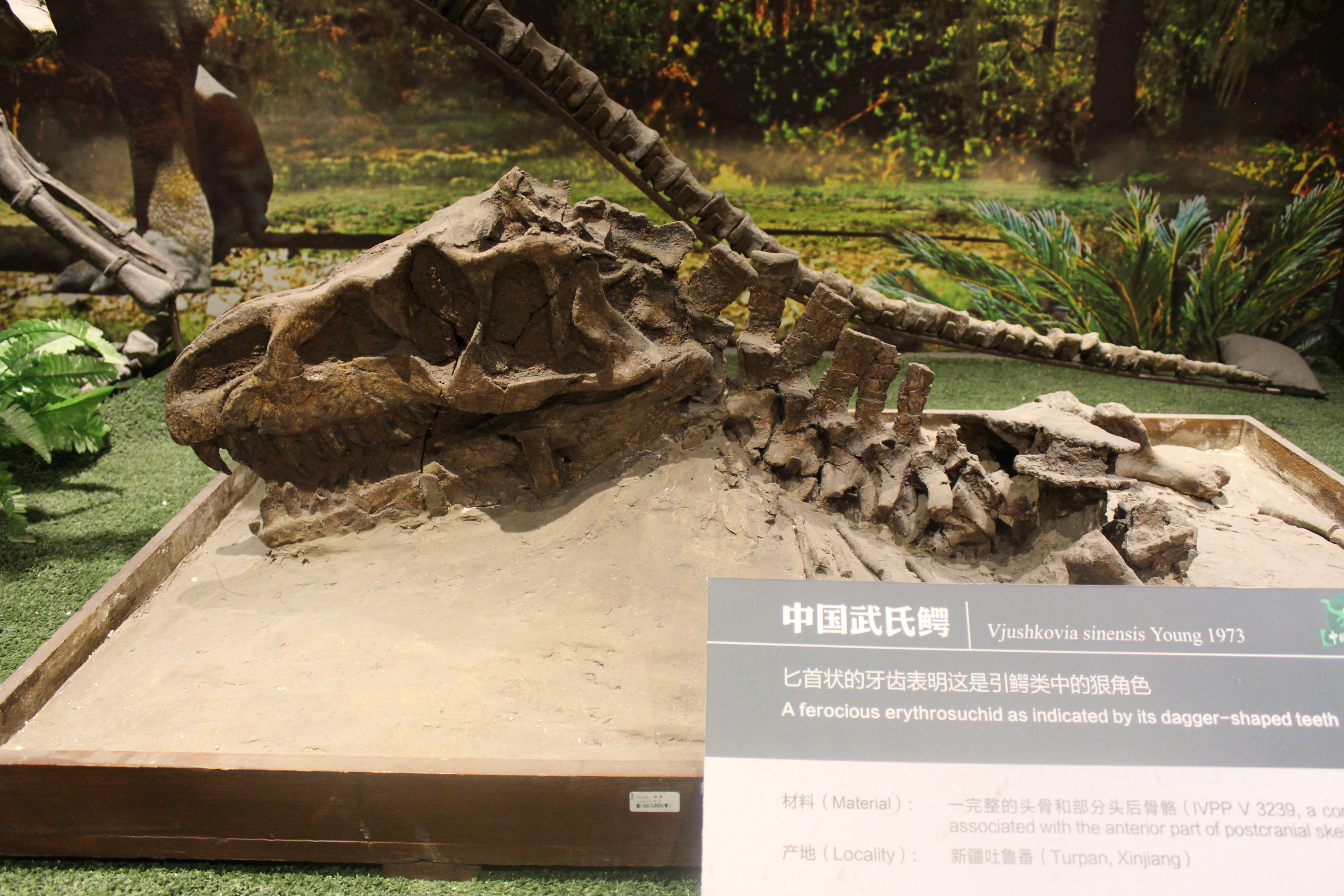
- Holotype, Paleozoological Museum of China
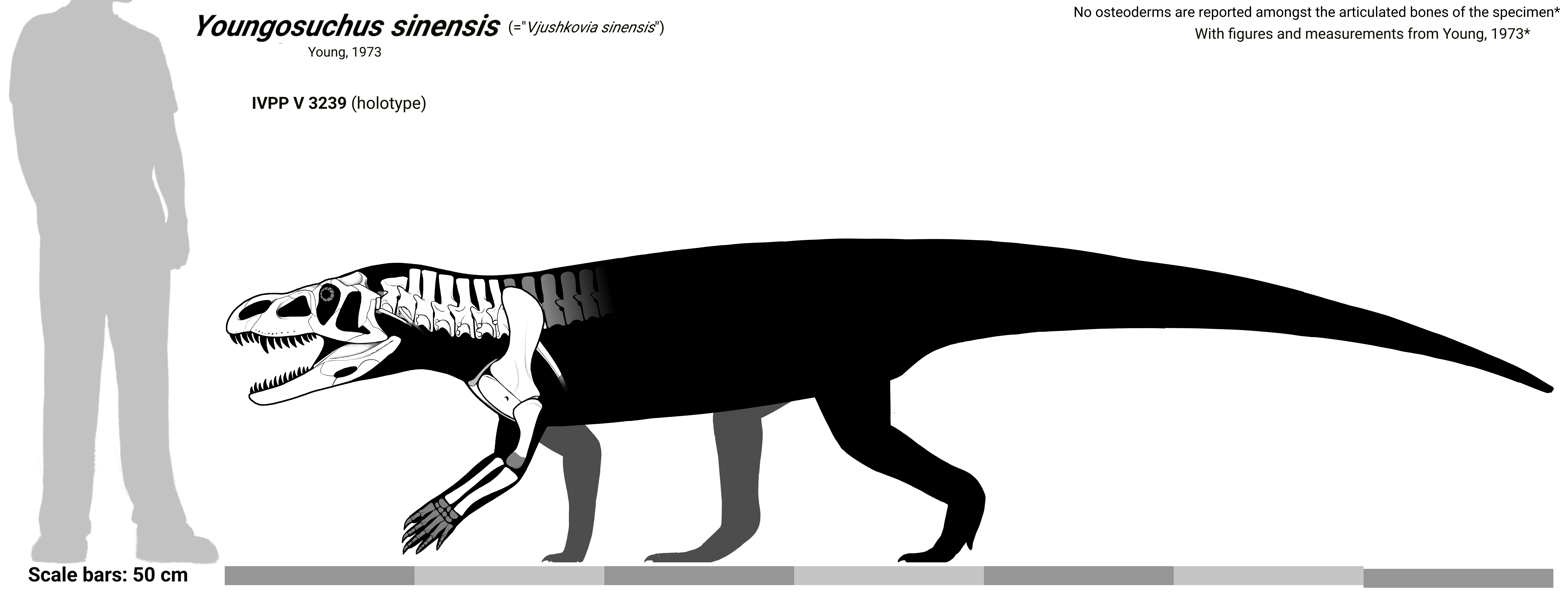
- Skeletal reconstruction and size comparison of the holotype

Scientific classification
- Kingdom: Animalia
- Phylum: Chordata
- Class: Reptilia
- Clade: Pseudosuchia
- Clade: Loricata
- Genus: †Youngosuchus; Kalandadze & Sennikov, 1985

Type species
- †Vjushkovia sinensis Young, 1973

= Youngosuchus =

Youngosuchus Temporal range: Middle Triassic

Extinct genus of reptiles

Youngosuchus is an extinct genus of archosaur from the Middle Triassic of China. The type species is Y. sinensis. Y. sinensis was first described in 1973 as a new species of the erythrosuchid Vjushkovia. In 1985, it was reassigned as its own genus of rauisuchid. A 1992 study supported the original classification of Youngosuchus sinensis as an erythrosuchid, but more recent studies classify it as a "rauisuchian"-grade loricatan archosaur completely unrelated to Vjushkovia, which is most likely a synonym of Garjainia.

== Description ==
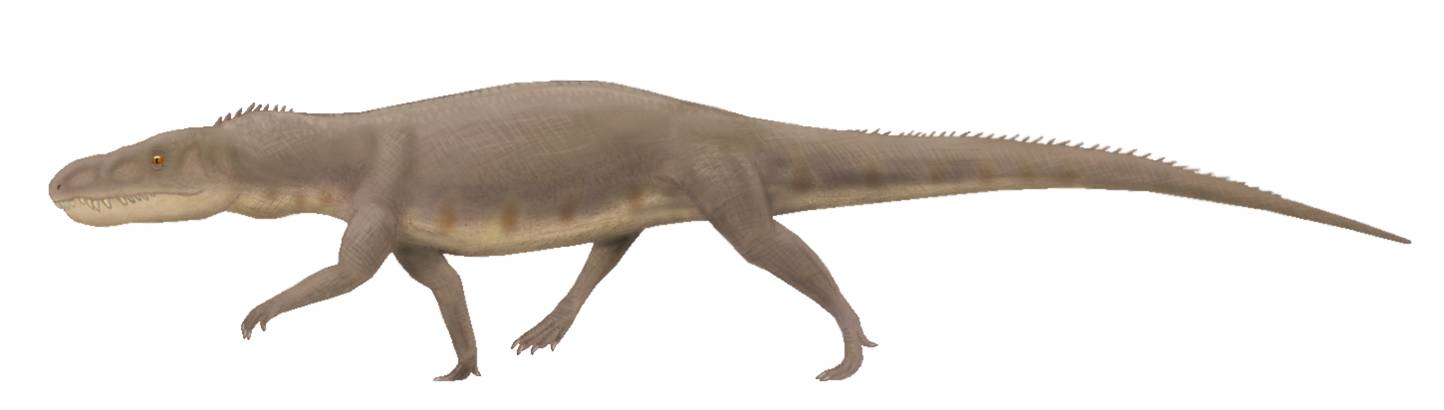
Life restoration

Youngosuchus is known from a well-preserved skeleton recovered from the Kelamayi Formation in the Junggur Basin of Xinjiang, China. The skeleton, referred to as IVPP V 3239, includes a complete skull, cervical vertebrae, ribs, the pectoral girdle, and forelimbs. Youngosuchus has a large, deep skull with sharp recurved teeth. Osteoderms are not present on the skeleton, a possible indication that Youngosuchus did not have the body armor present in other early archosauriforms.

== Classification ==
The skeleton of Youngosuchus was first described in 1973 by Chinese paleontologist Yang Zhongjian, better known as C.C. Young. Young described it as Vjushkovia sinensis, a third species of the erythrosuchid genus Vjushkovia. Erythrosuchids are basal archosauriforms that are closely related to Archosauria, the group that includes living crocodiles and birds. In 1985, Russian paleontologists N.N. Kalandadze and Andreii Sennikov erected Youngosuchus as a new genus for V. sinensis, naming it after Young. They considered the two other species of Vjushkovia to members of the erythrosuchid genus Garjainia, and reclassified Y. sinensis as a rauisuchid. Rauisuchids are more derived than erythrosuchids because they lie within Archosauria, specifically within the clade Pseudosuchia.

Youngosuchus lacks several common erythrosuchid features. The skull table of Youngosuchus is flat, while in erythrosuchids the same region is slightly depressed. The depression of erythrosuchids is a remnant of the pineal foramen that was present in more primitive reptiles. The lack of a depression in the skull table of Youngosuchus suggests that it belongs to a more derived group than erythrosuchids. Another difference between Youngosuchus and erythrosuchids can be seen in the antorbital fenestra, a hole in the skull in front of the eyes. In Youngosuchus, the fenestra is large and triangular, but lacks the depressed upper and front margins seen in the skulls of erythrosuchids.

The assignment of Youngosuchus to Rauisuchidae was not widely accepted initially. Paleontologist J. Michael Parrish kept Y. sinensis as a species of Vjushkovia in his 1992 study of erythrosuchids, and continued to recognize Vjushkovia as a valid taxon distinct from Garjainia. Sennikov, along with paleontologist David J. Gower, rejected Parrish's conclusions in 2000 by considering V. triplocostata, the type species of Vjushkovia, a junior synonym of Garjainia prima. In his 2000 overview of rauisuchians, Gower did not consider Y. sinensis to be a synonym of G. prima, instead suggesting that it was a rauisuchid. Martin Ezcurra (2016)'s study of archosauromorph classification placed Youngosuchus as a close relative of the loricatan Batrachotomus, positioned far away from Garjainia (which was considered indistinguishable from Vjushkovia).
