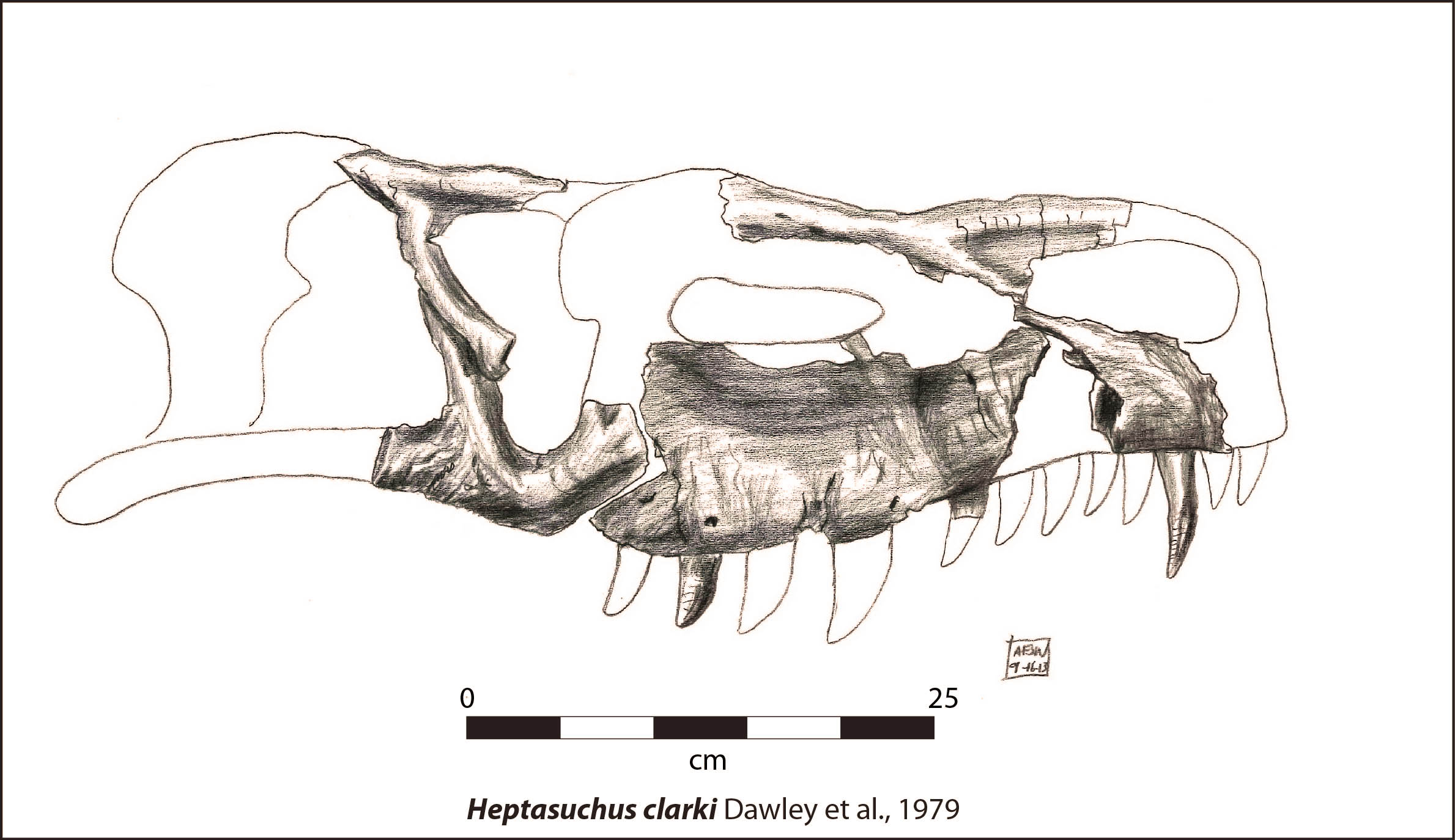
- Diagram of known skull elements

Scientific classification
- Kingdom: Animalia
- Phylum: Chordata
- Class: Reptilia
- Clade: Pseudosuchia
- Clade: Loricata
- Genus: †Heptasuchus; Dawley et al., 1979

Type species
- †Heptasuchus clarki Dawley et al., 1979

= Heptasuchus =

Heptasuchus Temporal range: Middle - Late Triassic, 238–230 Ma

Extinct genus of reptiles

Heptasuchus is an extinct genus of loricatan pseudosuchian known from the Middle or Late Triassic upper Chugwater Group of Wyoming, United States. It contains a single species, Heptasuchus clarki, the first formally recognized "rauisuchian" or loricatan pseudosuchian from North America.

== Discovery and history ==
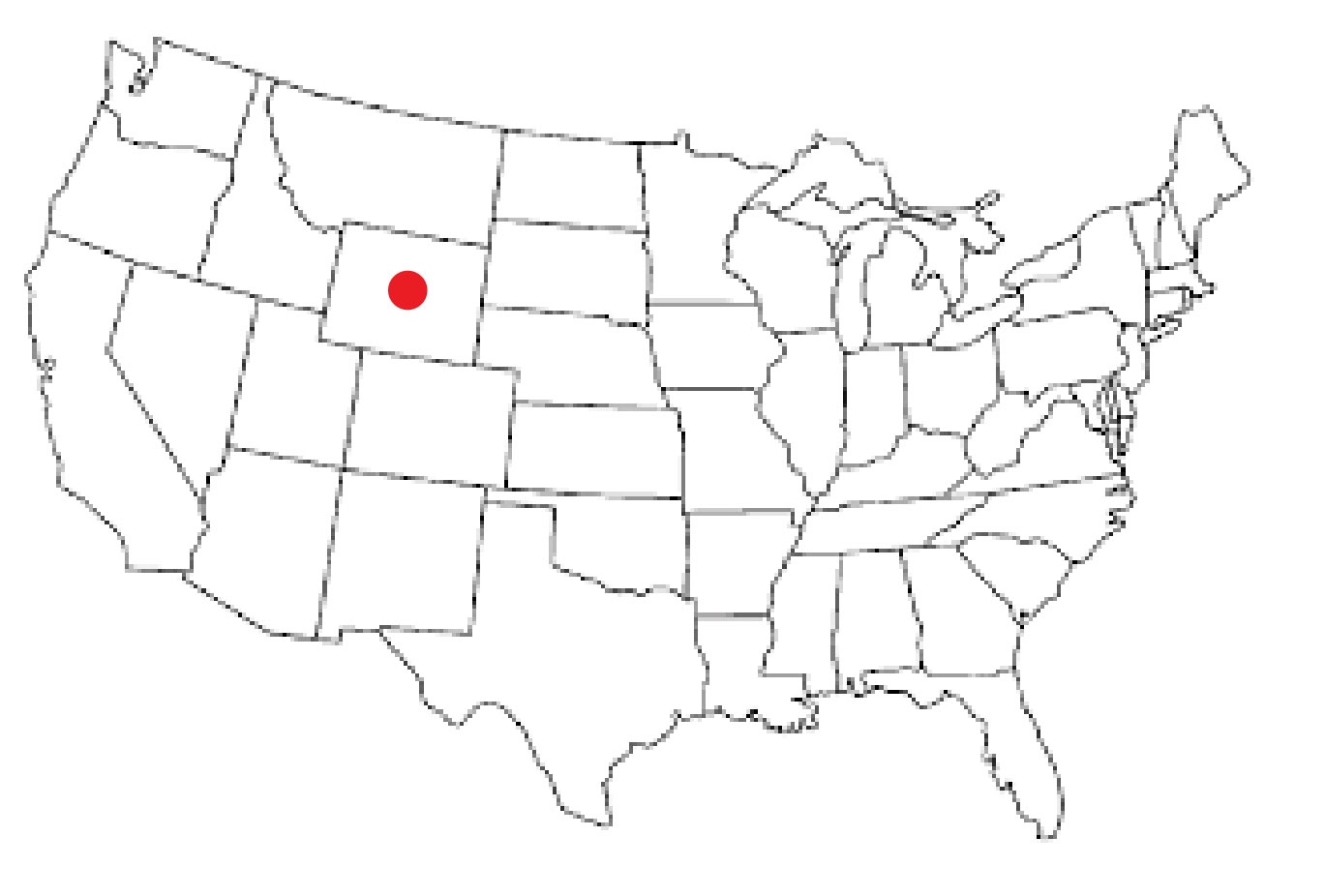
The Clark locality in Wyoming, where fossils of Heptasuchus have been discovered.

Collected in the summer of 1977 at the newly discovered Clark locality northwest of Casper Wyoming, the specimens assigned to H. clarki were described in a brief article and two master's theses at Wayne State University, Detroit. Heptasuchus was first formally described and named by Robert M. Dawley, John M. Zawiskie and J. W. Cosgriff in 1979 and the type species is Heptasuchus clarki. The generic name is derived from epta (ἑπτά), "seven" in Ancient Greek, and suchus (συχος) which is the Latinised form of the Ancient Greek word for the crocodile god of ancient Egypt. The specific name honors George Clark of Casper for discovering the type locality of Heptasuchus. UW 11562, a partial skull and associated postcranial skeleton was designed as the holotype and UW 11563 through UW 11565, representing partial cranial and postcranial remains not associated with the holotype were designed as paratypes. Little research followed the initial report, although Heptasuchus has been listed in various publications summarizing fossils of Wyoming and the Triassic. Thought to be lost until 1997, most of the specimens now reside at the University of Wyoming, although some elements are still unaccounted for.

The type locality of H. clarki occurs within a succession of red beds and carbonates above the Crow Mountain Formation which in turn overlies the Alcova Limestone within the Chugwater Group. The Chugwater Group is exposed as an outcrop belt along the trend of the Casper Arch flanking the southeastern Big Horn Mountains. The age of the type locality is not precisely known, but since it is lithostratigraphically equivalent to the lower Popo Agie Formation, though possibly chronostratigraphically older, it is probably Carnian or late Ladinian. Zawiskie et al. (2011) suggested that all of the pseudosuchian elements collected at the locality belong to Heptasuchus and the taxon is not a chimera as previously suggested by Wroblewski (1997). About 50% of the osteology of the taxon is preserved from a minimum of four individuals with overlapping skeletal elements.

=== Taphonomy ===
The remains of Heptasuchus accumulated at the base of a muddy sheet flood deposit that includes intraformational carbonate-rich conglomerate co-mingled with the skeletal elements, at what was once thought to be the base of the Popo Agie Formation in a silty, sandy matrix overlain by an oxidized mudstone. The fossil locality probably represent a drought assemblage since the specimens are weathered, disarticulated, and confined to a small area that later served as a locus for deposition of water and sediment. Thoroughly disarticulated and showing signs of subaerial weathering, the remains of Heptasuchus occur alongside those of small, unidentified archosaurs and phytosaurs (represented by teeth and possible skeletal elements or in the case of the small archosaur, a nearly complete series of vertebral centra).

== Description ==
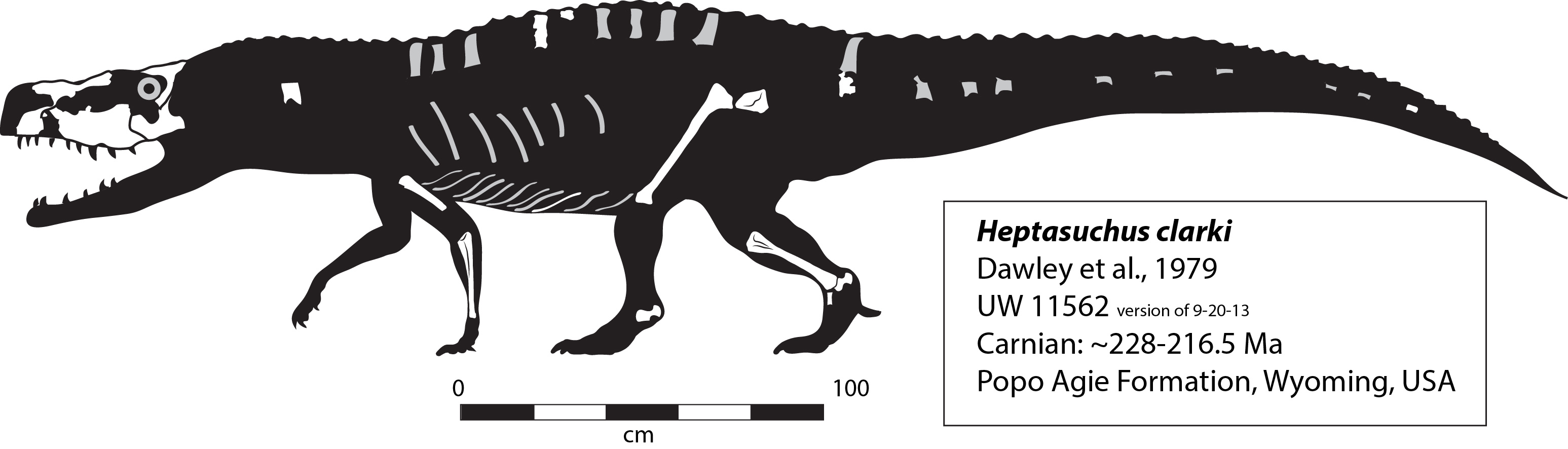
Skeletal reconstruction of Heptasuchus holotype showing bones in white where specimens are figured or in collections, and those in grey that have been reported but not figured or available at the time of illustration

Heptasuchus was a medium-sized archosaur, with a skull about 65 cm (26 in) long and an estimated total length of about 4.9–5.2 meters (16–17 ft) based on comparisons to Batrachotomus and 18–23 feet based on Dawley et al.'s restoration. It is unknown whether this taxon was an obligate quadruped or faculative biped and the only limb elements represented are a fragmentary humerus, an ulna, a tibia, calcanea, possible metapodials, and some phalanges that may be referable. No complete skull is known, but preserved elements indicate a taxon very similar to Batrachotomus from Germany with an arched nasal, large naris, and a postorbital bar that enters the orbit. Reconstructions of Heptasuchus depicting this taxon with unusually large premaxillary teeth are based on a single premaxillary tooth that has partially slipped out of its socket. The hip had a long, straight pubis which was curved in anterior view and had a pubic boot. The ulna was gracile and lacks a strong olecranon process seen in Postosuchus. Vertebrae are represented by cervical centra, some neural spines from the dorsals or caudals, and caudal centra. Fragments of ribs, gastralia, and possible osteoderms (bony scutes) were collected as well, but have not been formally described or illustrated.

Zawiskie et al. (2011) diagnosed Heptasuchus based on two autapomorphies, anatomical features that differentiate it from all other known archosaurs: the presence of large, posteriorly directed flanges on the parabasisphenoid and a distinct, orbit-overhanging postfrontal.

== Classification ==
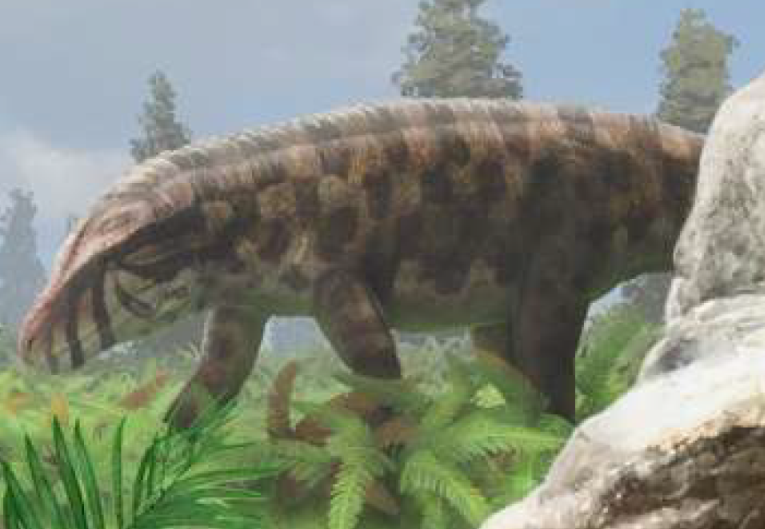
Life reconstruction

Heptasuchus was originally assigned to Rauisuchidae, based on similarities and traits shared with taxa like Prestosuchus, Postosuchus and Saurosuchus. It was suggested that Heptasuchus may prove to be synonymous with Poposaurus since they were both thought to be from the Popo Agie Formation, but this hypothesis has since been refuted. Early cladistic studies divided "rauisuchian" taxa between the two families of Rauisuchia; the Rauisuchidae and the Prestosuchidae. Subsequent phylogenetic analyses, that excluded Heptasuchus, found Rauisuchia and Prestosuchidae to be non-monophyletic, placing "prestosuchids" and some taxa previously assigned to Rauisuchidae outside the clade containing Rauisuchidae and Crocodylomorpha. A phylogenetic analysis of archosaurs presented in an abstract found sister taxon relationship between Heptasuchus and Batrachotomus within Loricata, with a strong support of at least six shared discrete character states.

== Paleoecology ==
Heptasuchus may have shared its environment with other taxa similar to ones recovered from Popo Agie Formation outcrops along the Wind River Range. These include the phytosaurs Angistorhinus and Paleorhinus, the poposaurid Poposaurus, the dicynodont Eubrachiosaurus and trematosaurian amphibians of the family Metoposauridae. Indeterminate specimens of possible archosauriformes have also been collected from the site, but their identity remains unknown. Heptasuchus was a hypercarnivore and may have hunted or scavenged these animals and any others it came across.

Since several individuals are represented by the type and referred material in a single locality, it has been suggested that Heptasuchus may have lived in groups. Such aggregations are common among other loricatan genera (e.g. Batrachotomus, Decuriasuchus and Postosuchus) and predators in general (e.g. Allosaurus, dire wolf and modern alligators), suggesting that these animals, being hypercarnivores, may have dominated dwindling water supplies during drought before later succumbing to the drought themselves. Similar aggregations of predators include the famous Allosaurus concentration at the Cleveland-Lloyd dinosaur quarry in the Morrison Formation of Utah and the asphalt pits at Rancho LaBrea from the Pleistocene of Los Angeles.
