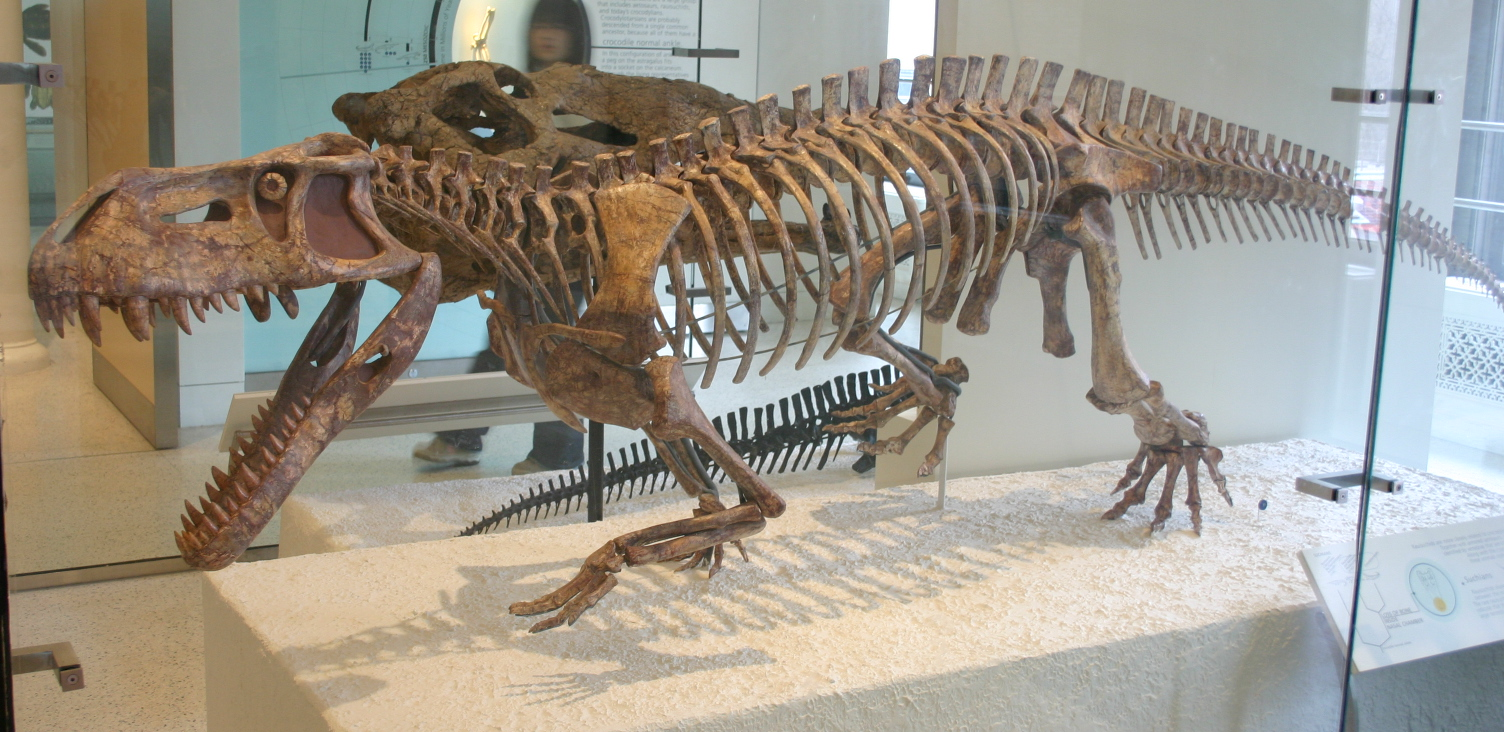
- Skeleton of Prestosuchus chiniquensis, an early loricatan.

Scientific classification
- Kingdom: Animalia
- Phylum: Chordata
- Class: Reptilia
- Clade: Pseudosuchia
- Clade: Paracrocodylomorpha
- Clade: Loricata; Merrem, 1820

Subtaxa
- †Apatosuchus; †Arganasuchus; †Batrachotomus; †Dagasuchus; †Decuriasuchus; †Etjosuchus; †Fasolasuchus; †Heptasuchus; †Mandasuchus?; †Youngosuchus; †Prestosuchidae (paraphyletic?); †Rauisuchidae; Crocodylomorpha

= Loricata =

Loricata Temporal range: Olenekian - Recent, 247–0 Ma

Clade of reptiles

Loricata is a clade of archosaur reptiles that includes crocodilians and some of their Triassic relatives, such as Postosuchus and Prestosuchus. More specifically, Loricata includes Crocodylomorpha (the persistent archosaur subset which crocodilians belong to) and most "rauisuchians", a paraphyletic grade of large terrestrial pseudosuchians which were alive in the Triassic period and ancestral to crocodylomorphs.

Loricata is one branch of the group Paracrocodylomorpha; the other branch is the clade Poposauroidea, an unusual collection of strange "rauisuchians" including bipedal, herbivorous, and sail-backed forms. The vast majority of typical "rauisuchians", which were usually quadrupedal predators, occupy basal (early-branching) rungs of Loricata leading up to crocodylomorphs.

== History and classification ==
Loricata was initially named in a completely different context by German naturalist Blasius Merrem in his 1820 Versuch eines Systems der Amphibien. Merrem considered it to be one of three groups of Pholidota (reptiles), the other two being Testudinata (turtles) and Squamata (lizards and snakes). Loricata was an early name for the order that includes crocodiles, alligators, and gharials. That order is now referred to as Crocodilia (or Crocodylia), the crocodilians.

The name Loricata gained a new phylogenetic definition in 2011. In his study of early archosaur phylogeny, paleontologist Sterling J. Nesbitt defined it as the most inclusive clade containing Crocodylus niloticus (the Nile crocodile), but not Poposaurus gracilis, Ornithosuchus longidens, or Aetosaurus ferox, all of which were extinct species of Triassic archosaurs closer to crocodilians than to dinosaurs.

Nesbitt considered the following features to be synapomorphies (distinguishing features) of Loricata:

- Four teeth in the premaxilla (the toothed bone at the tip of the snout).
- A ridge on the surface of the lower branch of the squamosal (the multi-pronged bone forming the upper rear corner of the skull).
- A projection on the squamosal which encroaches the infratemporal fenestra (the boxy hole on the side of the skull behind the eye socket)
- A tall, narrow orbit (eye socket).
- A ridge for the attachment of the iliofibularis muscle positioned halfway down the length of the fibula (outer shin bone).
- A distinct gap on the calcaneum (heel bone) between the articulation for the fourth distal tarsal bone and the tip of the calcaneal tuber.
- A projection at the base of the fifth metatarsal of the foot which is separated from the end of the bone by a concave gap.

Nesbitt's phylogenetic analysis placed Crocodylomorpha and an array of "rauisuchians" within Loricata. Rauisuchidae was found to be a small clade, forming the sister taxon of Crocodylomorpha. Prestosuchidae, on the other hand, was reconfigured into a paraphyletic grade, forming a series of more basal loricatans. Loricata is the sister taxon of Poposauroidea, a group of unusual Triassic rauisuchians. Below is a cladogram of Loricata from Nesbitt (2011):

- Paracrocodylomorpha
  - Poposauroidea †
  - Loricata
    - Prestosuchus †
    - - Saurosuchus †
      - - Batrachotomus †
        - - Fasolasuchus †
          - - Rauisuchidae †
            - Crocodylomorpha

França, Langer and Ferigolo (2011) found that, when added to Nesbitt's analysis (2011), Decuriasuchus was recovered as the basalmost loricatan. Its addition influenced the phylogenetic placement of Ticinosuchus as well; in Nesbitt's original analysis it was recovered outside Loricata, but when Decuriasuchus was included in the analysis, Ticinosuchus was recovered as a basal member of Loricata.

Prior to 2011, poposauroids were sometimes viewed as closer relatives of crocodylomorphs than rauisuchids and "prestosuchids" were. The clade Paracrocodylomorpha was named in 1993 to include poposaurids and crocodylomorphs. Although Paracrocodylomorpha was originally designated to exclude rauisuchids and "prestosuchids", Nesbitt (2011) found that most members of those groups are closer to crocodylomorphs than poposauroids are. Thus, Paracrocodylomorpha was redefined into a two-pronged group, one prong containing poposauroids and the other (i.e., Loricata) including crocodylomorphs, rauisuchids, and "prestosuchids". Loricata is considered to be a subgroup of Paracrocodylomorpha according to this redefinition.

A clade called Paracrocodyliformes was erected in 2007 in which rauisuchids and prestosuchids were more closely related to Crocodylomorpha, and poposauroids were the most basal group. This usage is similar to Loricata.
