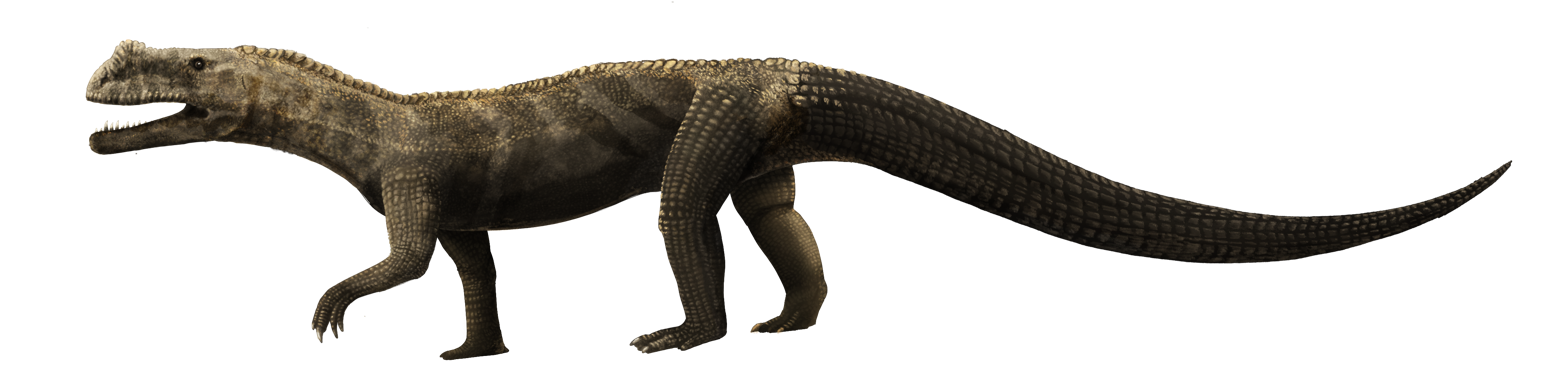
- Life restoration of D. quartacolonia.
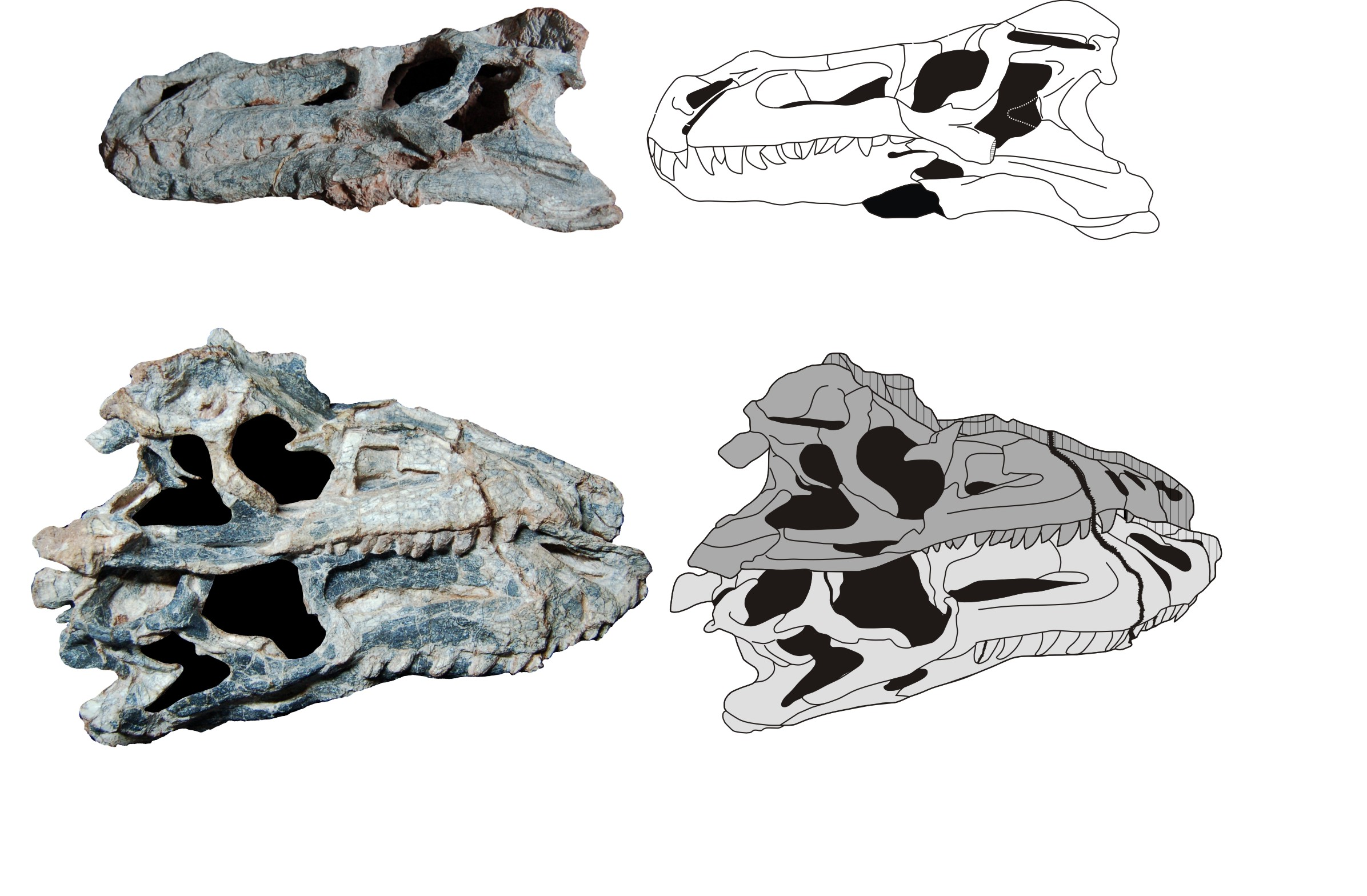
- Skulls of D. quartacolonia.

Scientific classification
- Kingdom: Animalia
- Phylum: Chordata
- Class: Reptilia
- Clade: Archosauria
- Clade: Pseudosuchia
- Clade: Paracrocodylomorpha
- Clade: Loricata
- Genus: †Decuriasuchus; França et al., 2011

Type species
- †Decuriasuchus quartacolonia França et al., 2011

= Decuriasuchus =

Decuriasuchus Temporal range: Middle Triassic, 240–235 Ma

Extinct genus of reptiles

Decuriasuchus is an extinct genus of loricatan from the Middle Triassic period (Ladinian stage). It is a carnivorous archosaur that lived in what is now southern Brazil, in Paleorrota. It was first named by Marco Aurélio G. França, Jorge Ferigolo and Max C. Langer in 2011 and the type species is Decuriasuchus quartacolonia. The generic name means "unit of ten crocodiles" in Latin and Greek in reference to the ten known specimens and the animal's possible group behavior. The specific name refers to the Quarta Colonia region where the fossils were collected.

== Description ==
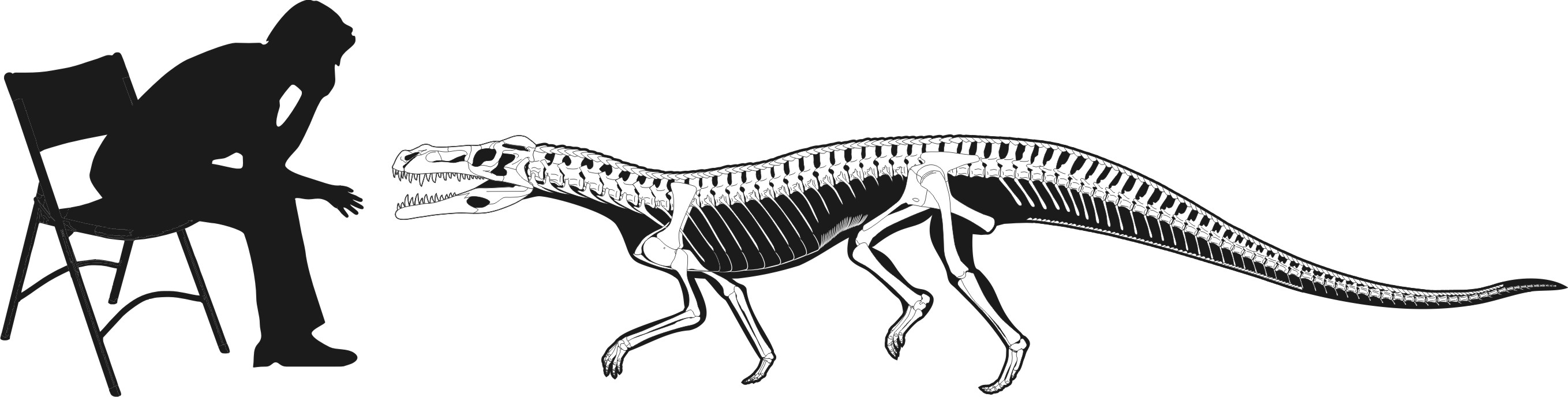
Size of Decuriasuchus in comparison to a human

Decuriasuchus is known from ten specimens, including nine articulated and associated skeletons, three of which have nearly complete skulls. All known specimens represent immature individuals. The holotype MCN PV10105a consists of an articulated partial skeleton, lacking scapular girdle and limbs. Eight specimens associated with the holotype, MCN PV10105b-i, and the tenth specimen (MCN PV10004), consists of cranial remains from a different spot in the same locality. The specimens were found in the Alemoa Member of the Santa Maria Formation, Rosário do Sul Group. The discovery locality is Rio Grande do Sul, Brazil.

Like other rauisuchids, Decuriasuchus was a quadrupedal carnivore that was one of the top predators of its environment. The specimens known are around 2.5 metres (8.2 ft) in length.

== Classification ==
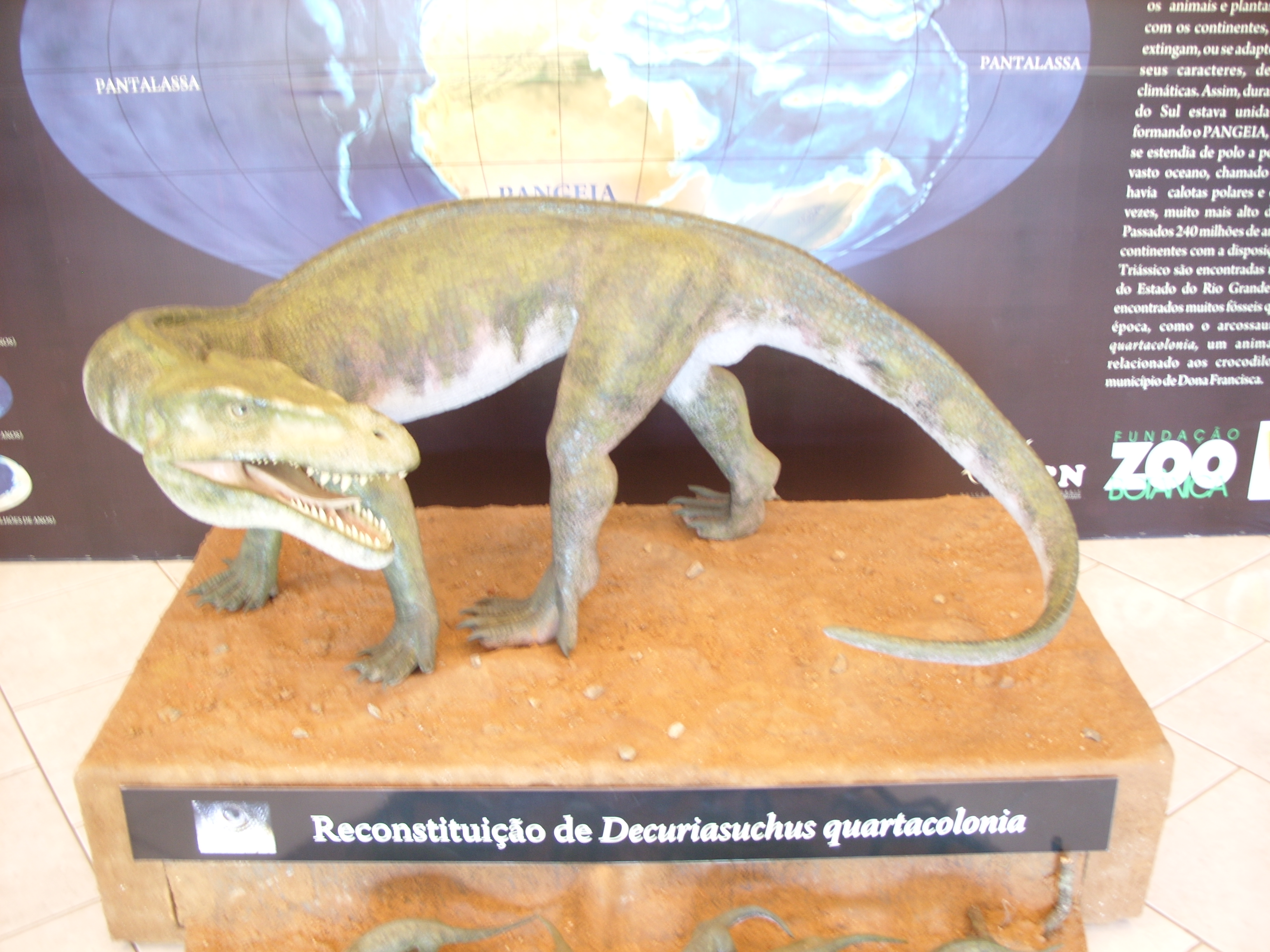
Decuriasuchus at the Museu de Ciências Naturais da Fundação Zoobotânica

Decuriasuchus is closely related to the genera Prestosuchus and Batrachotomus. An initial phylogenetic study of the genus placed it in the family Prestosuchidae, but found the group "Rauisuchia" to be paraphyletic. The study was based on an earlier 2010 analysis of archosaurs. A later study involved adding Decuriasuchus to a 2011 analysis of archosaur relationships; D. quartacolonia was recovered as the basalmost member of the clade Loricata (the most inclusive clade containing Crocodylus niloticus but not Poposaurus gracilis, Ornithosuchus longidens or Aetosaurus ferratus), with Ticinosuchus as the next most primitive taxon. As a rauisuchian, Decuriasuchus is a distant relative of modern crocodilians.

== Paleobiology ==
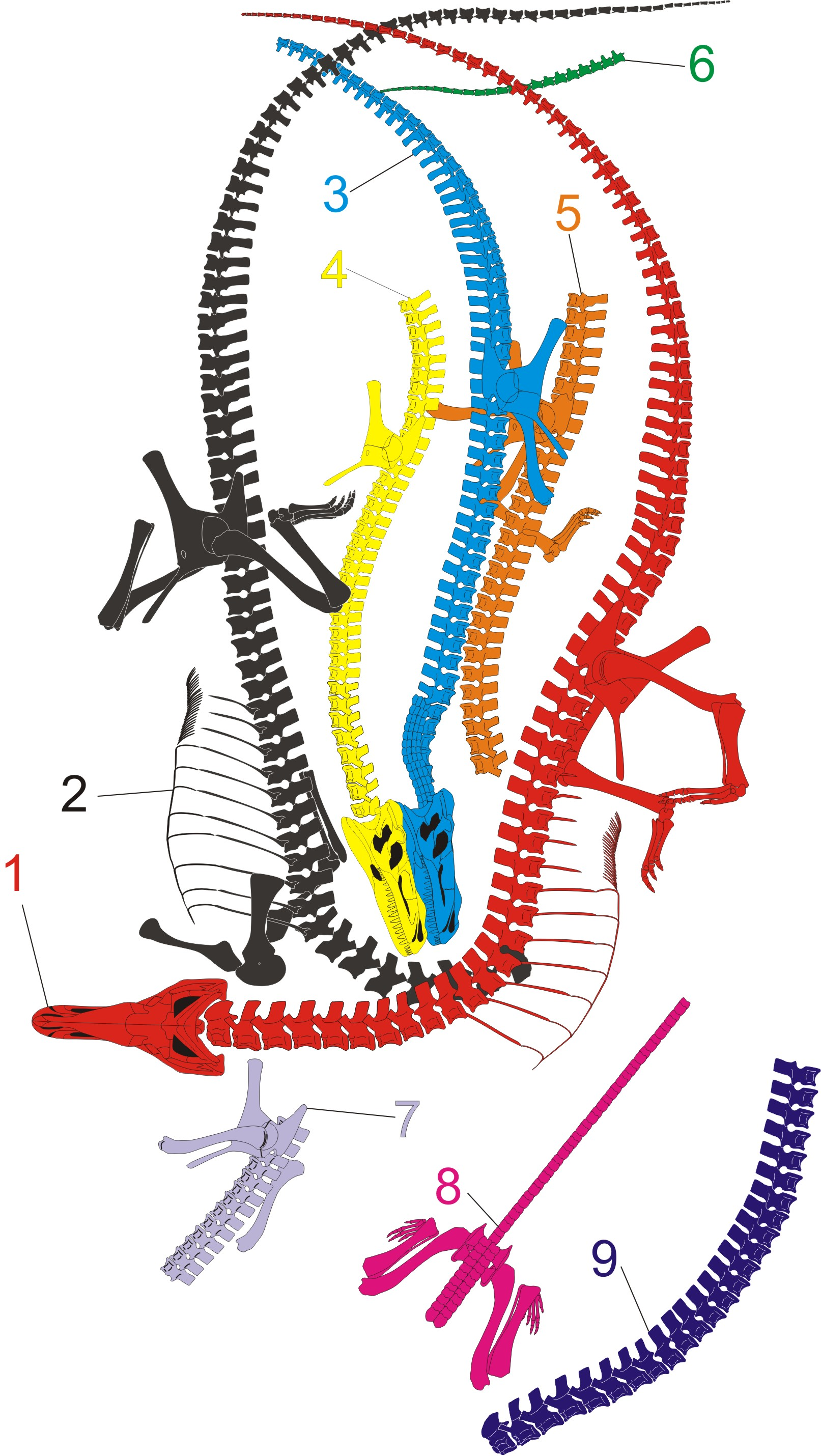
Diagram of the nine associated skeletons

Nine specimens of Decuriasuchus were found in close proximity to each other. A study of the taphonomy of the site (the conditions under which the skeletons became fossilized) indicates that the assemblage represents the single burial of multiple individuals rather than the collection of unrelated remains in one spot over a longer period of time. The congregation of nine individuals in one area suggests that they may have been traveling in a group. If this were the case, Decuriasuchus would be the earliest known archosaur to exhibit group behavior.

== Ontogeny and Relation to Prestosuchus ==
As Decuriasuchus is known only from immature individuals, estimates of the animal's adult life appearance are difficult. The specimens known all come from a single outcrop which also contains adult Prestosuchus remains. Young archosaurs grow rapidly and cyclically, meaning adult Decuriasuchus may have reached sizes comparable to adult Prestosuchus. This, in combination with their similar skull morphology (the only part of the specimens which has been described in detail) has led some paleontologists to hypothesize the taxa may be closely related, or even the same species. A major point of support for this hypothesis is that the distinguishing traits (autapomorphies) which separate Decuriasuchus from its contemporaries may be the result of its immaturity. Traits like its small size and limited fusion of the skull bones could change as the animal matures, and specimens of adult Prestosuchus with described skull material share several diagnostic traits with Decuriasuchus. The primary obstacle to the effective comparison of these two taxa is the limited description and preparation of the Decuriasuchus holotype and associated skeletons. Currently, the only diagnostic traits for Decuriasuchus are those of the skull and teeth, which often changes throughout development in archosaurs. This makes comparison to Prestosuchus difficult and frustrates efforts to answer questions regarding the identity of the specimens.

Despite its complicated taxonomy, the Decuriasuchus bonebed is highly informative regarding early diverging archosaur ontogeny and social behavior. Many living pseudosuchians exhibit 'juvenile cluster behavior,' a tendency to gather in groups before reaching maturity. This, observed behavior, in combination with similar assemblages of other juvenile fossil archosaurs, supports the hypothesis that the individuals of Decuriasuchus were associated prior to their death and burial and likely lived together at the time of death. The growth of Decuriasuchus has largely been studied through osteohistology, a technique common in vertebrate paleontology. A similarity in growth rate was observed between the juvenile Decuriasuchus in the bonebed and archosaur Batrachotomus, and if this rate estimation was correct an adult Decuriasuchus would reach a size well within the range of known Prestosuchus specimens, 6 metres (20ft.) Decuriasuchus-like rapid growth in certain archosaur taxa is well-documented, but others, like Aetosaurs and derived crocodyliforms grew more slowly.
