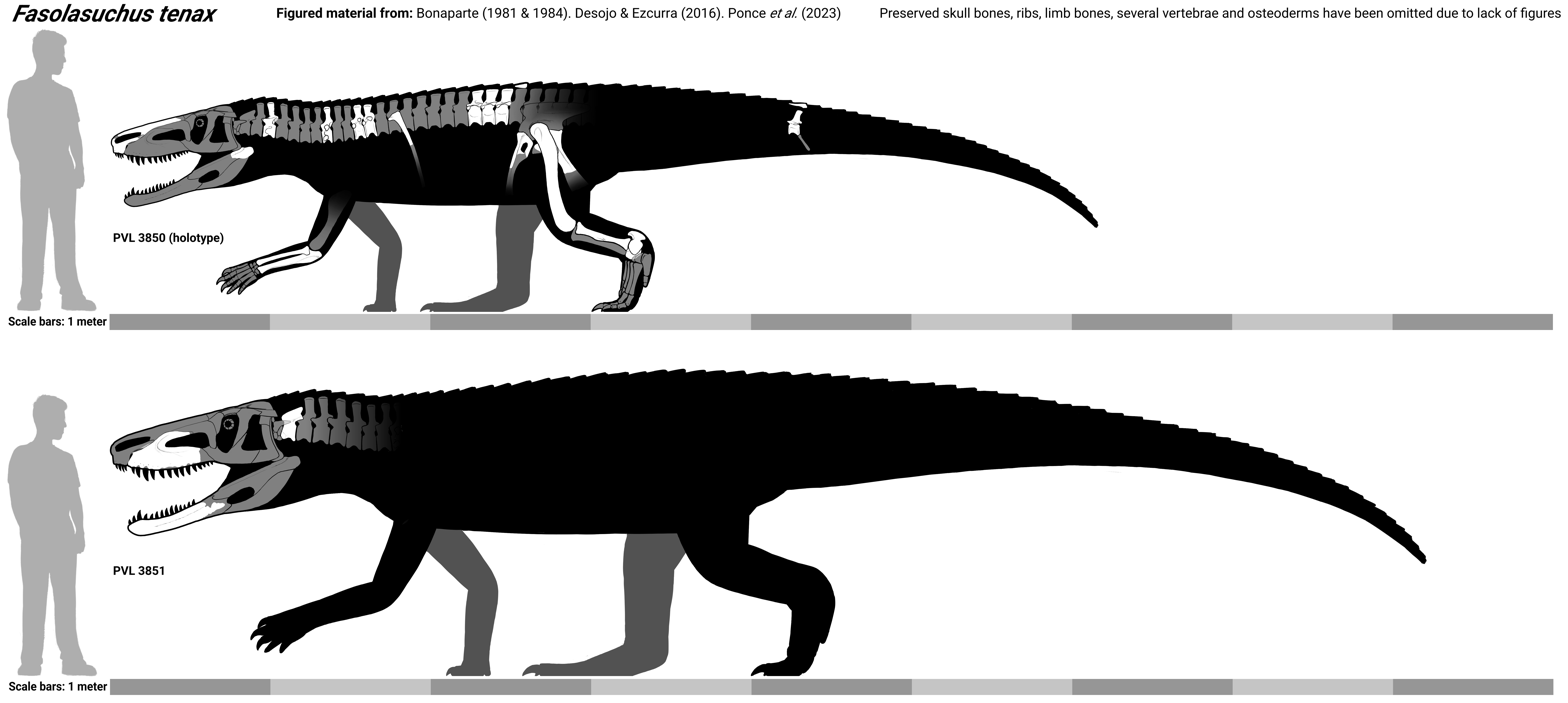
- Skeletal reconstruction and size comparison of both known specimens. More bones are preserved than those showcased, but they're unfigured in the literature
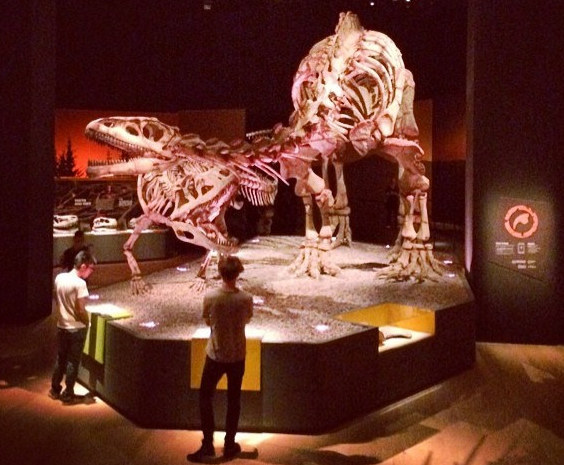
- Fasolasuchus in front of the sauropod Lessemsaurus, in Singapore

Scientific classification
- Kingdom: Animalia
- Phylum: Chordata
- Class: Reptilia
- Clade: Pseudosuchia
- Genus: †Fasolasuchus; Bonaparte, 1981
- Species: †F. tenax

Binomial name
- †Fasolasuchus tenax Bonaparte, 1981

= Fasolasuchus =

Fasolasuchus Temporal range: Norian ~220–213 Ma

Extinct genus of reptiles

Fasolasuchus is an extinct genus of loricatan. Fossils have been found in the Los Colorados Formation of the Ischigualasto-Villa Unión Basin in northwestern Argentina that date back to the Norian stage of the Late Triassic, making it one of the last rauisuchians (an informal grouping of large pseudosuchians) to have existed before rauisuchians became extinct at the end of the Triassic. Fasolasuchus exceeds the size of other large "rauisuchians" and very large sebecids like Barinasuchus, making it the largest non-dinosaurian terrestrial predator known. It is known from two individuals of different sizes, found very close to each other, these represent partial cranial and postcranial remains.

== Description ==
Fasolasuchus is likely the largest known rauisuchian, with an estimated length of 8–10 m (26–33 ft) This would make Fasolasuchus the largest terrestrial predator to have ever existed save for large theropods, surpassing the Cenozoic Barinasuchus, the rauisuchian counterpart Saurosuchus at 7 m (23 ft), and many medium-sized theropods as large as Ceratosaurus. It had two rows of osteoderms along its back; these were likely in a one-to-one ratio with the vertebrae, but like Saurosuchus, it had only a single row on the tail, unusual among rauisuchians. It also had a hyposphene-hypantrum articulation that gave the vertebral column extra rigidity. This feature is also seen in several other rauisuchians such as Postosuchus as well as saurischian dinosaurs.

In the smaller individual (the holotype), the femur is 70 cm (28 in) in length, double that of the fibula.

== Paleobiology ==
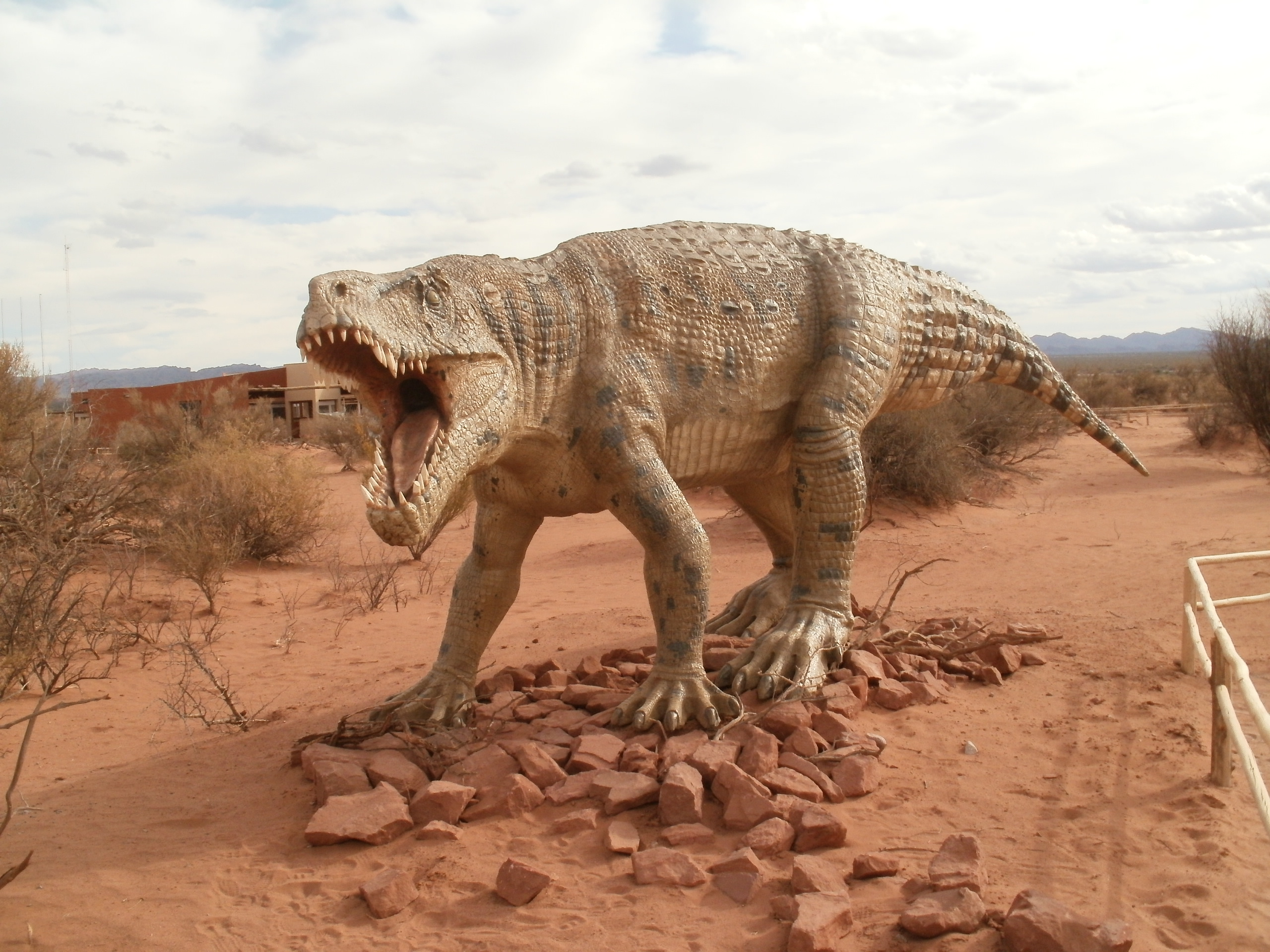
A model of Fasolasuchus at Talampaya National Park

A study on bone microstructure determined that Fasolasuchus had a relatively fast growth rate, similar to most other rauisuchians, with the exception of Prestosuchus. The same study also determined that the specimen was somatically and skeletally mature, but it wasn't possible to determine sexual maturity: this may be due to taphonomic causes, however the bone cortex was mostly preserved and didn't show the changes in bone matrix or in vascularization that would be expected if the specimen was sexually mature. Alternatively, Fasolasuchus attained sexual maturity contemporaneously to or slightly later than somatic and skeletal maturity (although this growth pattern is today only found in birds, not crocodilians), or there were differences in the timing of maturity of different bones in the same individual, as reported in the tuatara and in some dinosaurs.

== Phylogeny ==
Cladogram after the analysis of Nesbitt (2011):

- Paracrocodylomorpha
  - Poposauroidea
  - Loricata
    - Prestosuchus
    - - Saurosuchus
      - - Batrachotomus
        - - Fasolasuchus
          - - Rauisuchidae
            - Crocodylomorpha

== See also ==
- Razanandrongobe
