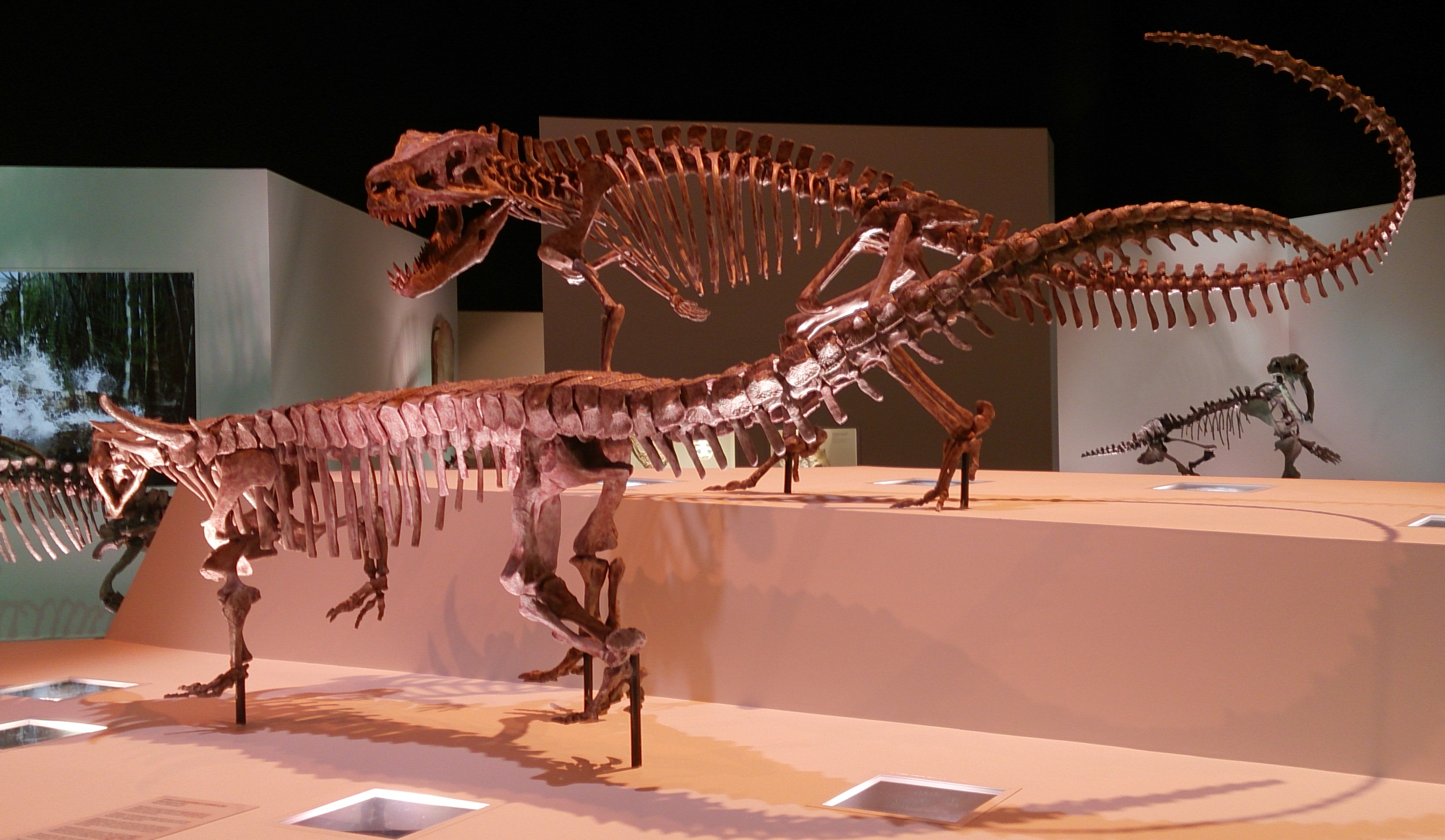
- Postosuchus (Rauisuchidae) and Desmatosuchus (Aetosauria)

Scientific classification
- Kingdom: Animalia
- Phylum: Chordata
- Class: Reptilia
- Clade: Archosauria
- Clade: Pseudosuchia; Zittel, 1887

Subgroups
- †Dasygnathoides; †Ornithosuchidae; †Phytosauria?; Suchia

Synonyms
- Crocodylotarsi Benton & Clark, 1988

= Pseudosuchia =

Pseudosuchians Temporal range: Early Triassic–Present, 248–0 Ma

Clade of reptiles

Pseudosuchia (from Ancient Greek ψεύδος (pseúdos), meaning "false", and Σοῦχος (Soûkhos), meaning "Sobek") is one of two major divisions of Archosauria, including living crocodilians and all archosaurs more closely related to crocodilians than to birds. Pseudosuchians are also informally known as "crocodilian-line archosaurs", in contrast to the "bird-line archosaurs" or Avemetatarsalia. Despite Pseudosuchia meaning "false crocodiles", the name is a misnomer as true crocodilians are now defined as a subset of the group.

The clade Pseudosuchia is potentially equivalent to another term, Crurotarsi, even though the latter has a different, node-based definition: "all taxa the least inclusive clade containing Rutiodon carolinensis (Emmons, 1856), and Crocodylus niloticus (Laurenti, 1768)." Many paleontologists of the late 20th century took this proposal for granted, using Crurotarsi as the term for crocodilian ancestors. In 2011, a major revision of Triassic archosaur relations proposed that Rutiodon's group, Phytosauria, was not as closely related to other traditional "crurotarsans", at least compared to avemetatarsalians such as pterosaurs and dinosaurs. Under that interpretation, Crurotarsi would be a much broader clade than Pseudosuchia. Other recent studies continue to support a more traditional phylogeny with phytosaurs as an early branch of Pseudosuchia. If the traditional interpretation is maintained, Pseudosuchia and Crurotarsi are roughly equivalent categories.

Contrary to popular belief, crocodilians differ significantly from their ancestors and distant relatives, as Pseudosuchia contains a staggering diversity of reptiles with many different lifestyles. Early pseudosuchians were successful in the Triassic period. They included giant, quadrupedal apex predators such as Saurosuchus, Prestosuchus, and Fasolasuchus. Ornithosuchids were mid-sized predators, while erpetosuchids and gracilisuchids were small, light-footed predators. A few groups acquired herbivorous diets, such as the heavily armored aetosaurs, and several were bipedal, such as Poposaurus and Postosuchus. The bizarre, ornithomimid-like shuvosaurids were both bipedal and herbivorous, with toothless beaks.

Many of these Triassic pseudosuchian groups went extinct at or before the Triassic–Jurassic extinction event. However, one group, the crocodylomorphs, survived the major extinction. Crocodylomorphs themselves evolved a diverse array of lifestyles during the Jurassic and Cretaceous periods, although living pseudosuchians only include crocodiles, alligators, caimans, and gavialids.

== Origin, decline, and re-use of the clade name Pseudosuchia ==
The name Pseudosuchia was originally given to a group of superficially crocodile-like prehistoric reptiles from the Triassic period, but fell out of use in the late 20th century, especially after the name Crurotarsi was established in 1990 to label the clade (evolutionary grouping) of archosaurs encompassing most reptiles previously identified as pseudosuchians. By this time, Pseudosuchia had also been defined as a clade, but it was not widely embraced until 2011.

In 2011 paleontologist Sterling Nesbitt proposed that Crurotarsi, as it was then defined, must include not only crocodilian-line archosaurs, but all other archosaurs including birds, non-avian dinosaurs, and pterosaurs. The clade Pseudosuchia as originally defined could still be used to identify crocodilian-line archosaurs, and since many recent studies support Nesbitt's findings, Pseudosuchia is again commonly used.

== Taxonomic history ==
The name Pseudosuchia was coined by Karl Alfred von Zittel in 1887–1890 to include three taxa (two aetosaurs and Dyoplax) that were superficially crocodilian-like, but were not actually crocodilian. Hence the name "false crocodiles".

In mid-20th century textbooks, like Alfred Sherwood Romer's Vertebrate Paleontology and Edwin H. Colbert's Evolution of the Vertebrates, Pseudosuchia constitutes one of the suborders of the now-abandoned order Thecodontia. Zittel's aetosaurs were placed in their own suborder, Aetosauria. Colbert considered small, lightly built archosaurs, such as Ornithosuchus and Hesperosuchus—both of which were at the time reconstructed as theropod dinosaur-like bipeds—to be typical pseudosuchians. These small forms were assumed to be the ancestors of all later archosaurs. The name Pseudosuchia became a wastebasket taxon into which all thecodonts that did not fit in the other three suborders could be placed. Even Sharovipteryx and Longisquama, two enigmatic Triassic reptiles that bear little resemblance to archosaurs, have been regarded as pseudosuchians.

Gauthier and Padian (1985) and Gauthier (1986) became the first to establish the name Pseudosuchia in a phylogenetic context, using it as a branch-based taxon for all archosaurs more closely related to crocodilians than to birds. This made the name Pseudosuchia somewhat ironic because true crocodiles (i.e. members of Crocodylia) were now included in the group. Phylogenetic definitions of Pseudosuchia include "Crocodiles and all archosaurs closer to crocodiles than to birds" (Gauthier and Padian), "Extant crocodiles and all extinct archosaurs that are closer to crocodiles than they are to birds" (Gauthier, 1986), and more recently "the most inclusive clade within Archosauria that includes Crocodylia but not Aves" (Senter, 2005). As a branch-based clade, Pseudosuchia is the sister taxon of another branch-based clade, the Avemetatarsalia. Avemetatarsalians are bird-line archosaurs, including pterosaurs and dinosaurs (the latter including birds).

A different definition was suggested by Benton and Clark, 1988: the node-based taxon including the last common ancestor of Rauisuchidae and aetosaurs and all of its descendants. Benton and Clark also named a group called Crocodylotarsi, which includes most taxa now considered pseudosuchians.

In 1990, Paul Sereno erected the clade Crurotarsi to supplant Pseudosuchia. However, Sereno defined Crurotarsi as a node-based clade, relying on the inclusion of groups such as Phytosauria, Aetosauria, and Crocodylomorpha. It is not equivalent to Pseudosuchia, which by definition must include all crocodilian-line archosaurs. For many years, Pseudosuchia and Crurotarsi have been considered partial synonyms because the latter clade encompasses all crocodilian-line archosaurs in most phylogenetic analyses. Sterling Nesbitt's 2011 analysis places one crurotarsan group, Phytosauria, outside Pseudosuchia. Since the definition of Crurotarsi relies on phytosaurs, their placement outside Pseudosuchia (and thus Archosauria) means that the clade Crurotarsi includes both pseudosuchians and avemetatarsalians.

== Description ==
Pseudosuchia is one of the two primary "daughter" clades of the Archosauria. The skull is often massively built, especially in contrast to ornithodires; the snout is narrow and tends to be elongated, the neck is short and strong, and the limb posture ranges from a typical reptilian sprawl to an erect stance like those of dinosaurs or mammals, although achieving it a different way. The body is often protected by two or more rows of armored plates. Many crurotarsans reached lengths of three meters or more.

== Evolution ==
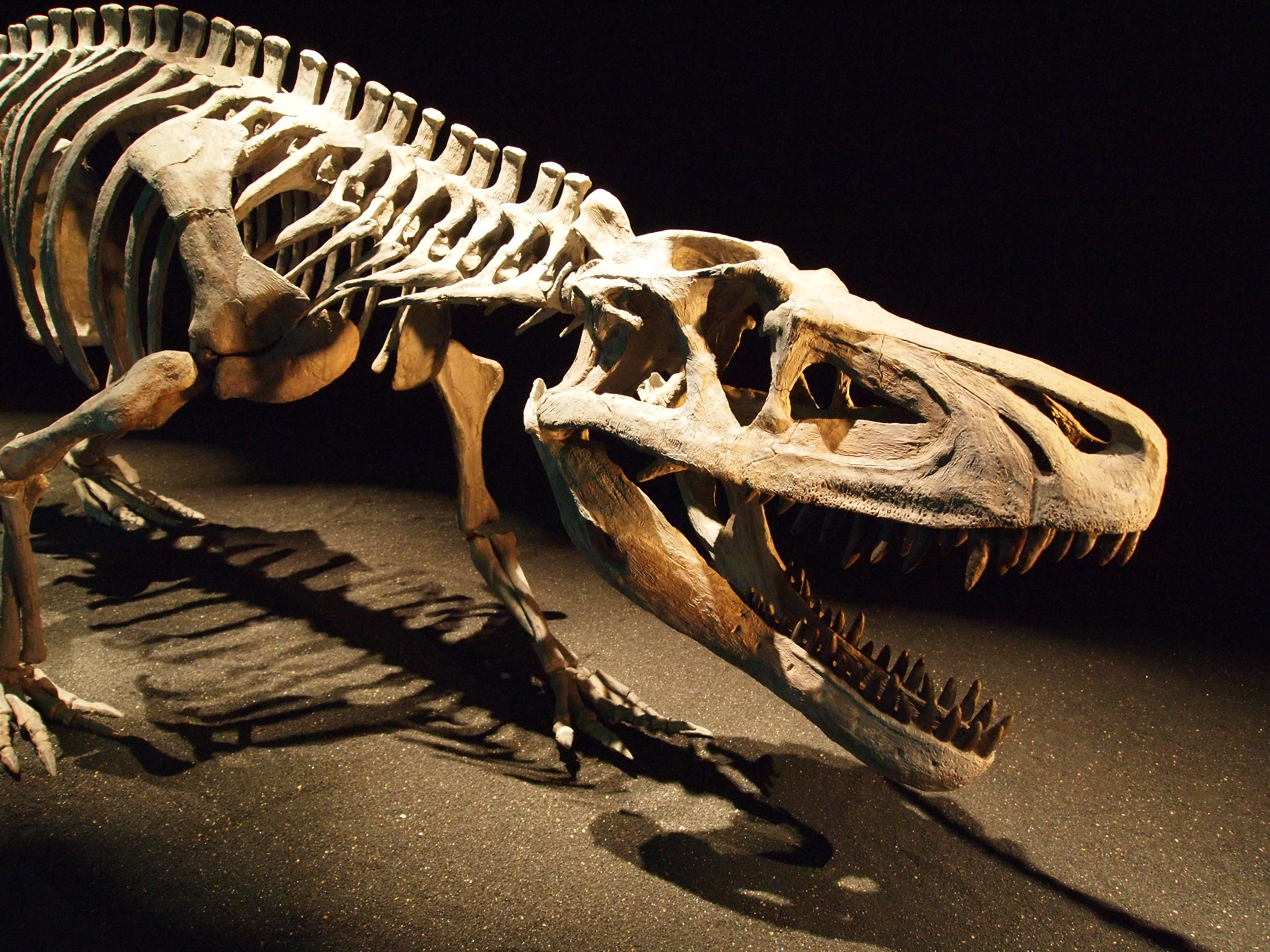
Mounted skeleton of the Triassic loricatan Saurosuchus galilei

Pseudosuchians appeared during the late Olenekian (early Triassic); by the Ladinian (late Middle Triassic) they dominated the terrestrial carnivore niches. Their heyday was the Late Triassic, during which time their ranks included erect-limbed rauisuchians, herbivorous armored aetosaurs, the large predatory poposaurs, the small agile sphenosuchian crocodilians, and a few other assorted groups.

The end-Triassic extinction caused the extinction of all the pseudosuchians with the exception of Sphenosuchia and Crocodyliformes (both Crocodylomorpha), the latter being the ancestors of modern-day crocodiles. A common misconception is that dinosaurs outcompeted the Triassic pseudosuchians, but this is not the case. A study published in 2010 postulates that there is significant evidence that volcanic eruptions changed the climate, causing a mass extinction that wiped out the dinosaurs' main competitors. This allowed the dinosaurs to succeed them as the dominant terrestrial carnivores and herbivores.

As the Mesozoic progressed, the Protosuchia gave rise to more typically crocodile-like forms. While dinosaurs were the dominant animals on land, the crocodiles flourished in rivers, swamps, and the oceans, with far greater diversity than they have today. With the end-Cretaceous extinction, the dinosaurs became extinct, with the exception of the birds, while the crocodilians continued with little change. Today, the crocodiles, alligators, and gharials are the surviving representatives of this lineage.

The Mesozoic range of cranial disparity is higher than the Triassic one, suggesting crocodylomorphs attained a high degree of diversification compared to Triassic pseudosuchians.

== Phylogeny ==
Pseudosuchia was defined as a stem-based clade in 1985. It includes crocodiles and all archosaurs more closely related to crocodiles than to birds. A second clade with a similar definition, Crocodylotarsi, was named in 1988, possibly as a replacement for Pseudosuchia. The name Pseudosuchia, meaning "false crocodiles", has been used for over a century, and traditionally included only non-crocodilians, but when defined as a clade, Pseudosuchia came to include the group Eusuchia ("true crocodiles") as well. Crocodylotarsi may have been named to remove confusion, but as a stem-based clade, it is synonymous with Pseudosuchia. Because Pseudosuchia was named first, it has precedence. A third group, Crurotarsi, traditionally included the same archosaurs as Pseudosuchia, but as a node-based clade it is not synonymous. The scope of Crurotarsi has recently been changed by the phylogenetic placement of phytosaurs. In 2011, Sterling J. Nesbitt found phytosaurs to be the sister taxon of Archosauria, and therefore not crocodile-line archosaurs. Because phytosaurs are included in the definition of Crurotarsi, crurotarsans are not solely crocodile-line archosaurs, but also bird-line archosaurs and phytosaurs. Under this phylogeny, Crurotarsi includes phytosaurs, crocodiles, pterosaurs, and dinosaurs, while Pseudosuchia still contains only crocodile-line archosaurs. Below is a cladogram modified from Nesbitt (2011) showing the new changes (bold terminal taxa are collapsed).

- Archosauriformes
  - †Proterosuchidae
  - - †Erythrosuchus
    - - †Vancleavea
      - - †Proterochampsia
        - - †Euparkeria
          - Crurotarsi
            - †Phytosauria
            - Archosauria
              - Avemetatarsalia (bird-lineage of archosaurs)
              - Pseudosuchia (crocodilian‑lineage of archosaurs)
                - †Ornithosuchidae
                - Suchia
                  - †Gracilisuchus
                  - †Turfanosuchus
                  - - †Revueltosaurus
                    - †Aetosauria
                  - - †Ticinosuchus
                    - Paracrocodylomorpha
                      - †Poposauroidea
                      - Loricata
                        - †Prestosuchus
                        - - †Saurosuchus
                          - - †Batrachotomus
                            - - †Fasolasuchus
                              - - †Rauisuchidae
                                - Crocodylomorpha

The following cladogram is from a slightly older study, Brusatte, Benton, Desojo and Langer (2010). Bold terminal taxa are collapsed. Several results of the study, such as the retention of a monophyletic Rauisuchia, the retention of phytosaurs within Pseudosuchia, and a close relation between aetosaurs and crocodylomorphs, replicate the results of older studies. However, the findings of Nesbitt (2011) have been more widely supported by pseudosuchian-focused analyses published since 2011.

- - †Erythrosuchus
  - - †Euparkeria
    - - †Proterochampsidae
      - Archosauria
        - Avemetatarsalia
        - Crurotarsi Pseudosuchia
          - †Phytosauria
          - Suchia
            - - †Aetosauria
              - Paracrocodylomorpha
                - †Gracilisuchus
                - Bathyotica
                  - †Erpetosuchus
                  - Crocodylomorpha
            - - - †Revueltosaurus
                - †Ornithosuchidae
              - Rauisuchia
                - †Poposauroidea
                - Rauisuchoidea
                  - - †Arganasuchus
                    - - †Fasolasuchus'
                      - - †Stagonosuchus
                        - †Ticinosuchus
                  - - †Rauisuchidae
                    - Prestosuchidae
                      - †Saurosuchus
                      - - †Batrachotomus
                        - †Prestosuchus

== Sources ==
- Gauthier, J. (1986). "Saurischian monophyly and the origin of birds". In Padian, K. (ed.). The Origin of Birds and the Evolution of Flight. Memoirs California Academy of Sciences. Vol. 8. pp. 1–55.
- Senter, P. (2005). "Phylogenetic taxonomy and the names of the major archosaurian (Reptilia) clades". PaleoBios. 25 (2): 1–7.
- Sereno, P. C. 2005. Stem Archosauria—TaxonSearch [version 1.0, 7 November 2005]
