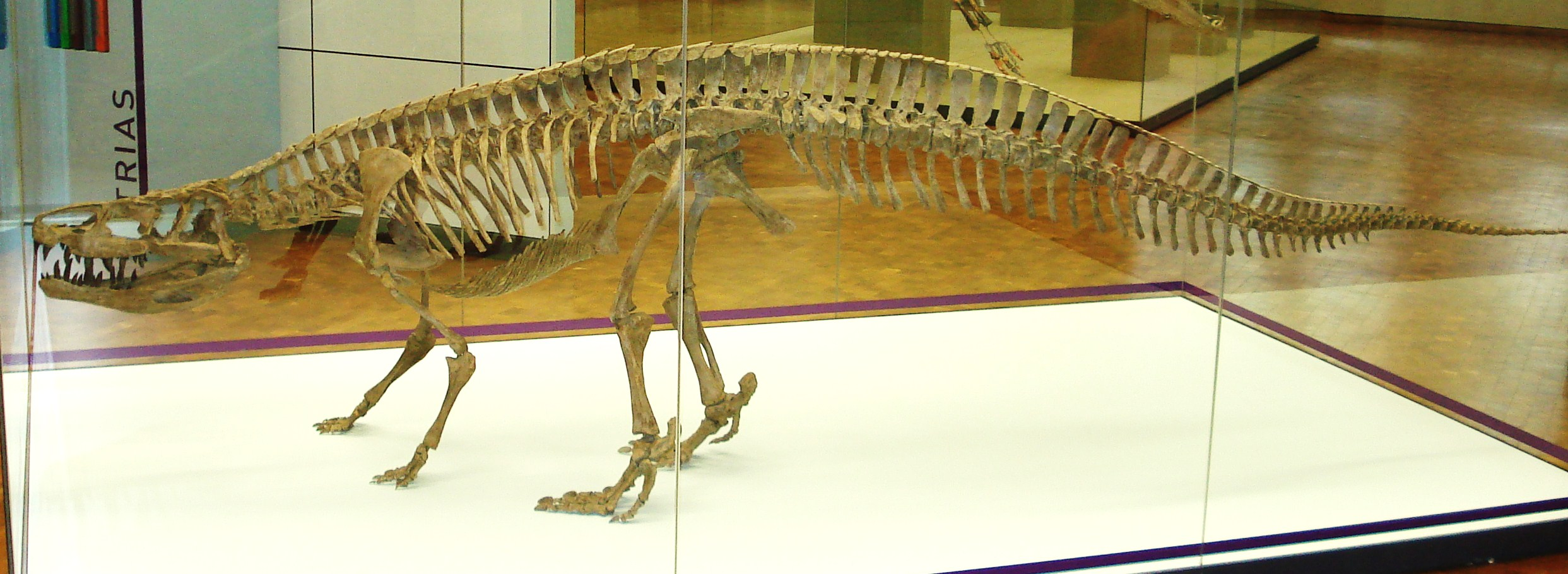
- Skeleton mount at Staatliches Museum für Naturkunde Stuttgart
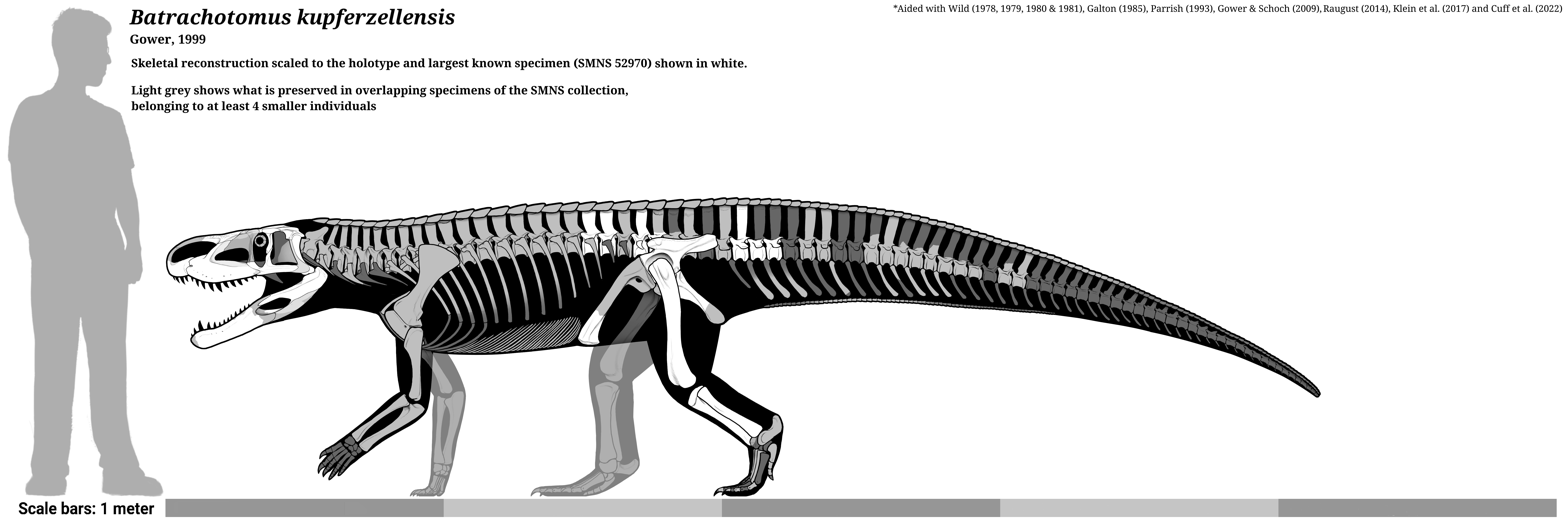
- Skeletal reconstruction and size comparison, scaled to the largest known specimen

Scientific classification
- Kingdom: Animalia
- Phylum: Chordata
- Class: Reptilia
- Clade: Pseudosuchia
- Clade: Loricata
- Genus: †Batrachotomus; Gower, 1999
- Species: †B. kupferzellensis

Binomial name
- †Batrachotomus kupferzellensis Gower, 1999

= Batrachotomus =

Batrachotomus Temporal range: Ladinian, Middle Triassic, 242–237 Ma

Genus of reptiles

Batrachotomus /ˌbætrəˈkɒtoʊməs/ is a genus of prehistoric archosaur. Fossils of this animal have been found in southern Germany and dated from the Ladinian stage of the Middle Triassic period, around 242 to 237 million years ago. Batrachotomus was described by palaeontologist David J. Gower 22 years after its discovery.

The locality where Batrachotomus lived was a swampy region and the name comes from the Greek batrachos/βάτραχος (frog) and tome/τομή (cutting, slicing), which refers to its preying on the large amphibian Mastodonsaurus. In contrast with sprawling reptiles, like crocodiles, this large carnivore was very agile with locomotor superiority due to its erect stance. A remarkable feature seen on its back was a row of paired, flattened bony plates. Batrachotomus was possibly an early relative of Postosuchus, which lived during the dawn of the dinosaurs.

== Description ==
Batrachotomus was a heavily built, large quadrupedal reptile. The holotype and largest known specimen (SMNS 52970), composed of an almost complete skull and partial postcranial skeleton, preserves a 47.8 cm (1.57 ft) long femur, and a ~50 cm (1.6 ft) long skull. A trait that characterized Batrachotomus, compared to other crurotarsans, was a series of paired small plates on its back which were attached to each vertebra. These bony deposits forming scales are called osteoderms. Flattened and leaf-shaped, these extended from behind the head along the column and reducing in size, ended at the tail. There is also evidence that osteoderms were present on the ventral region of the tail, as seen in Ticinosuchus ferox, and even on the flank, belly and limbs.

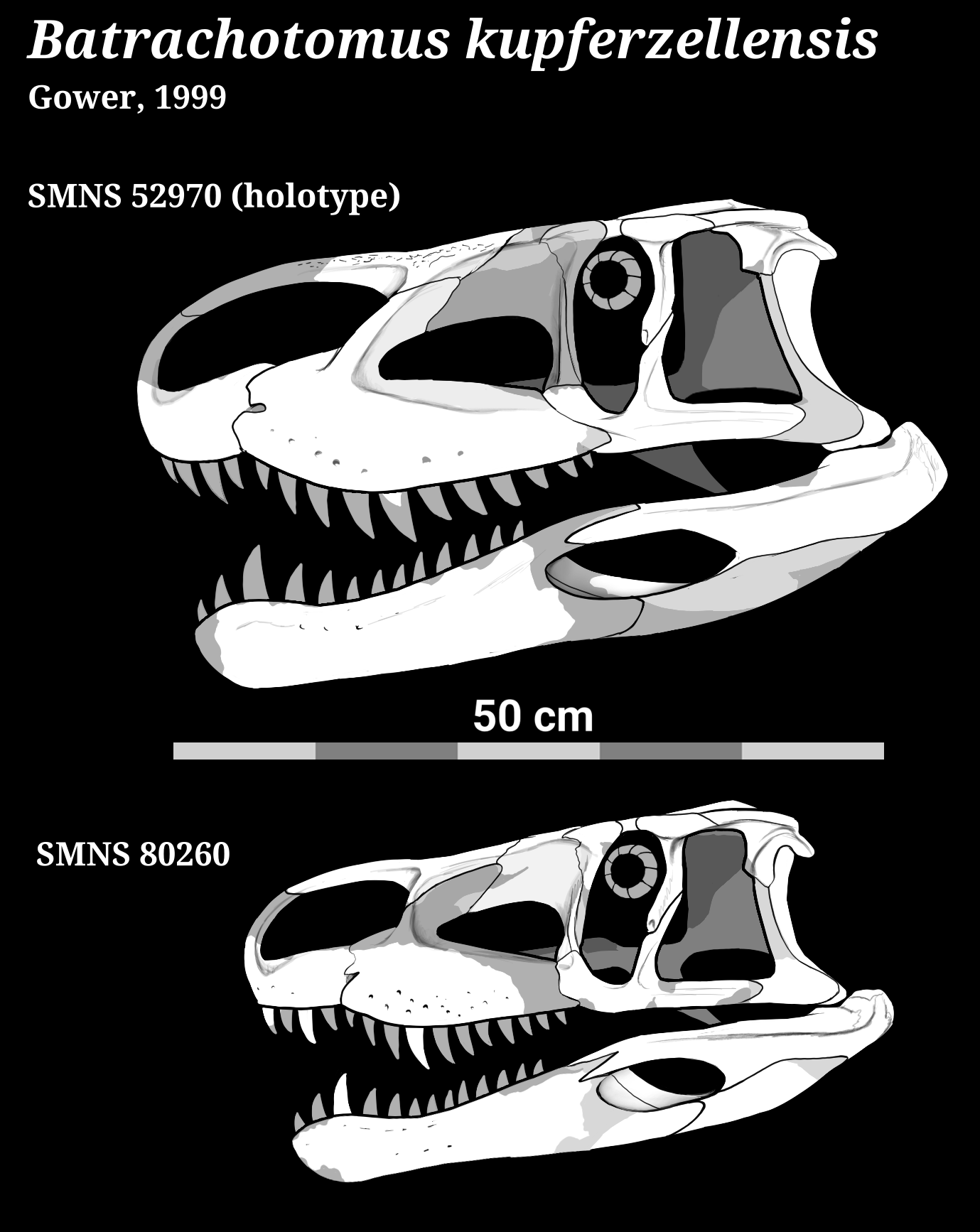
Skull diagram of two specimens

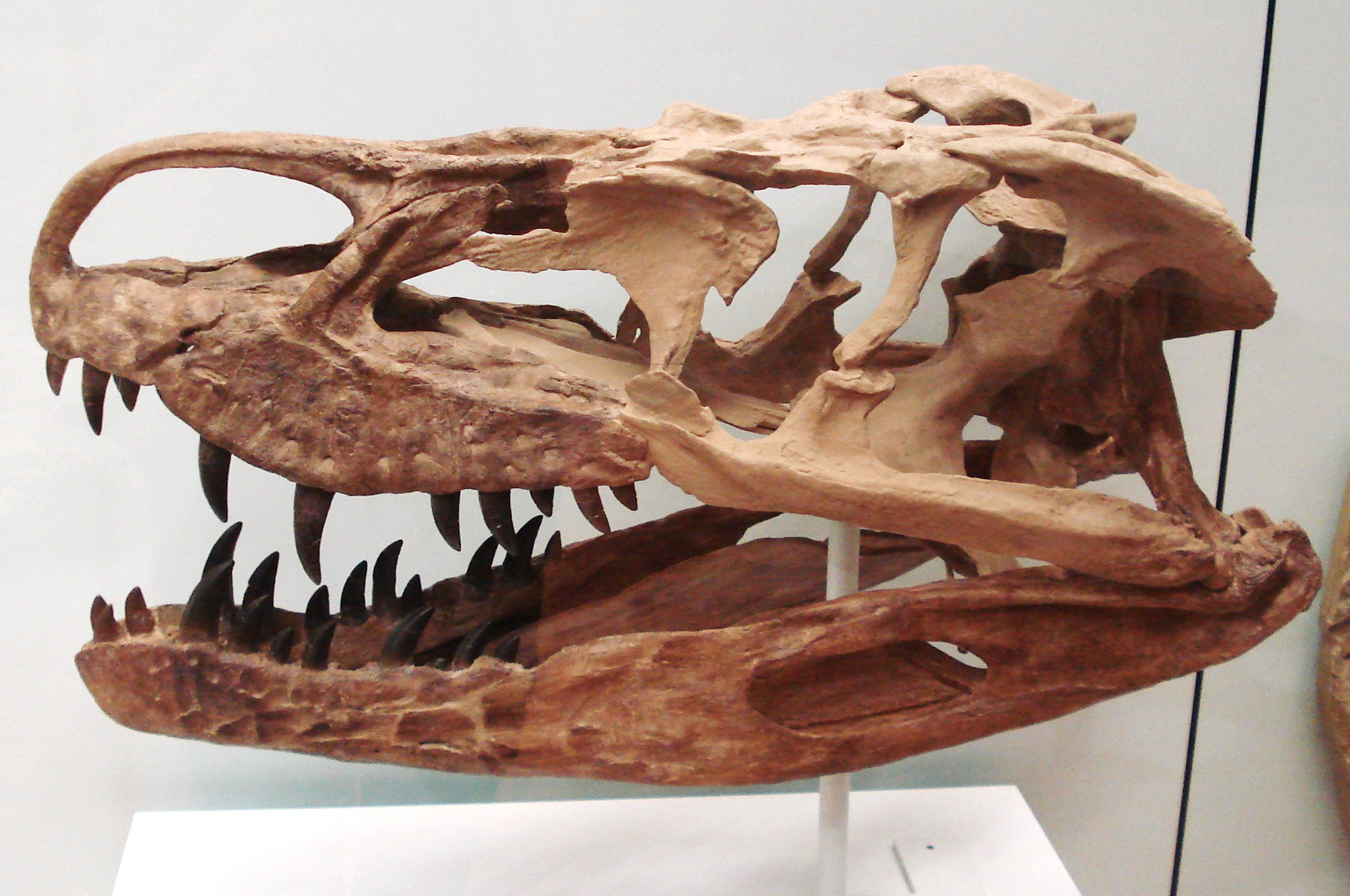
Reconstructed skull of the smaller specimen at the Staatliches Museum für Naturkunde Stuttgart

Like rauisuchians, Batrachotomus walked with an erect posture, although the limbs were not located directly under the trunk. The limbs were not equal in length as the forelimbs were about 70% of the hindlimbs. The toe bones (phalanges) are poorly preserved and the only well known bone is a fifth metatarsal (bone in hindlimbs attached to the toe bones) which was hooked in shape.

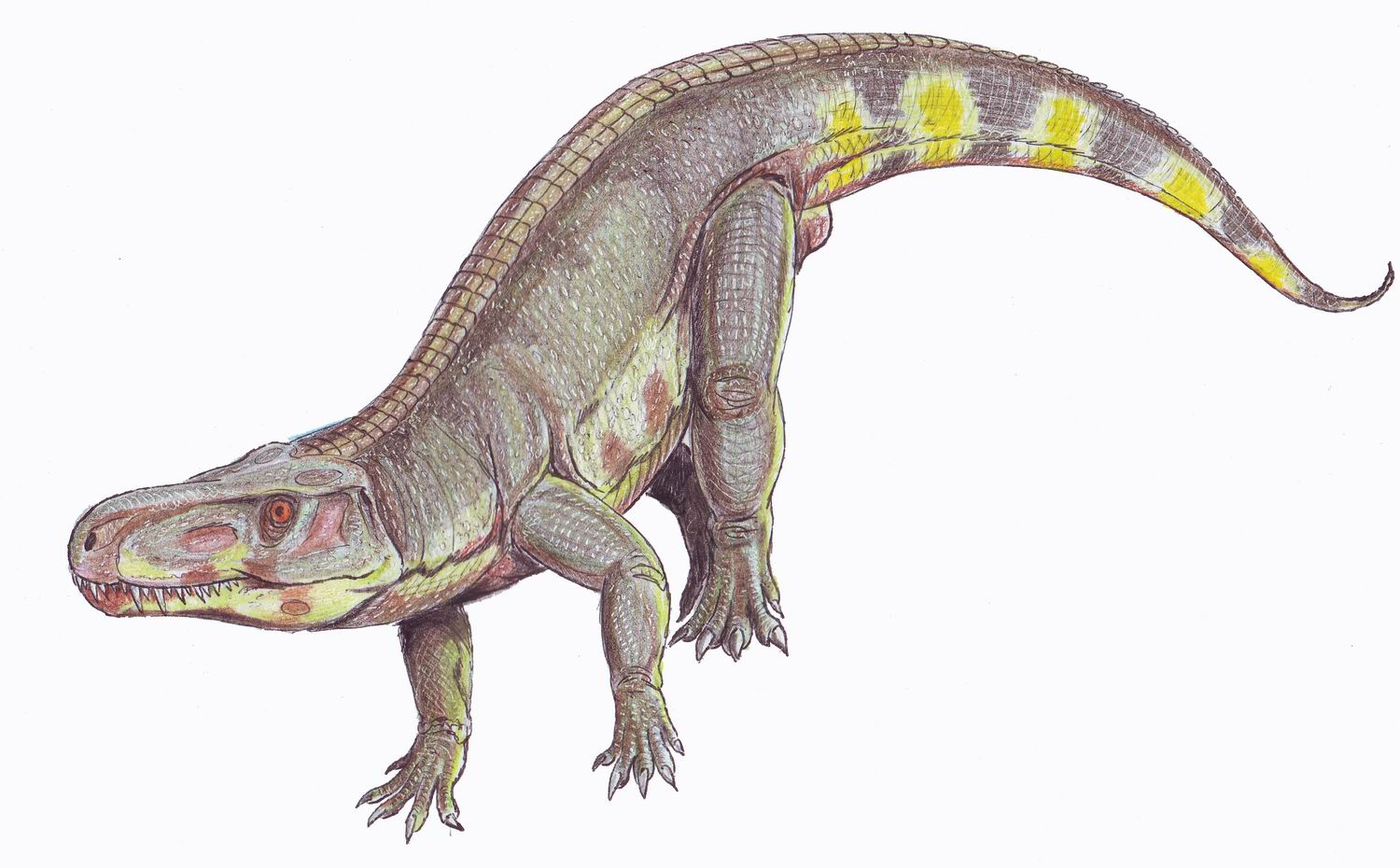
Artist's life restoration

Batrachotomus had a tall and narrow skull which possessed five pairs of fenestrae (skull openings), two pairs of which were for the eyes (called orbits) and the nostrils. Behind the orbits were two temporal fenestrae. These holes probably helped to reduce the weight of the skull and enabled the jaw to open more widely. As a typical archosaur, Batrachotomus had two antorbital fenestrae between the orbits and nostrils, and a fifth pair of small openings at the rear part of the lower jaw.

The jaws contained sharp teeth which were compressed laterally and unequal in size and shape, and this variation of tooth shape is known as heterodonty. The teeth on the premaxillae (bones at the very tip of the upper jaw) were slender, unlike those of the maxillae (the main tooth-bearing bones in the upper jaw) which had a straight posterior edge. The upper jaw bore 30 teeth, with each premaxilla carrying about 4 teeth and each maxilla 11, while the lower jaw held 22 teeth.

== Discovery and history ==
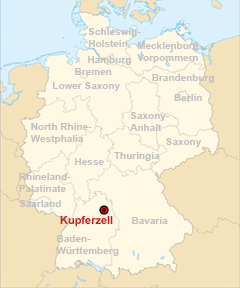
The Kupferzell locality in Germany, where fossils of Batrachotomus have been discovered.

Remains of Batrachotomus have been found in southern Germany, mainly in the Kupferzell fossil locality in northern Baden-Württemberg. Fossil collector Johann G. Wegele discovered the first specimens in a 1977 excavation at the Erfurt Formation, dated from the Longobardian (late Ladinian) age. Other remains attributed to Batrachotomus have been collected in Vellberg-Eschenau, about 10 km east of Schwäbisch Hall, and in Crailsheim. The most notable are from Vellberg-Eschenau, which are represented by well preserved ribs and vertebrae (MHI 1895), and evidence of forelimbs and hindlimbs (SMNS 90018). Batrachotomus today is displayed in the Muschelkalk Museum, Ingelfingen, Baden-Württemberg.

The fossils recovered from a marlstone remained undescribed until 1999 and palaeontologists referred to the genus simply as "rauisuchid" or "Kupferzellia". In 1999, palaeontologist David J. Gower described the holotype (SMNS 52970) from the 1977 excavation, which is the largest specimen of the genus, comprised by incomplete skull and postcranial material. Anatomy of the braincase (SMNS 80260) was made three years later, shedding light on the evolutionary relationships of the poorly known group of Rauisuchia. In 2009, Gower and Rainer R. Schoch reported a detailed reconstruction of the postcranial skeleton for the first time.

== Classification ==
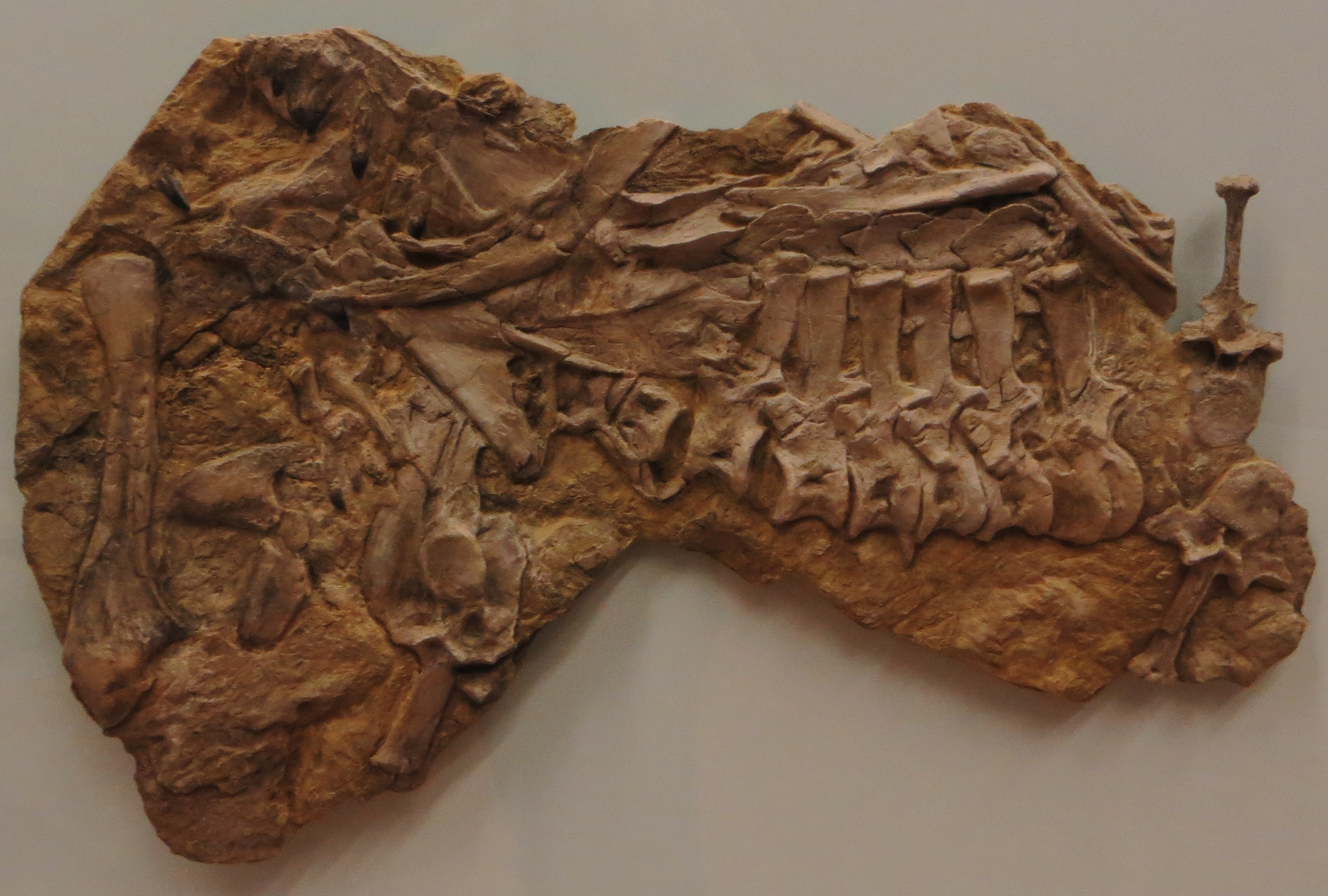
Fossil slab containing articulated cervical vertebrae, osteoderms, and disarticulated skull pieces (Museum am Lowentor, Stuttgart)

Batrachotomus was a prestosuchid, a member of a family of carnivorous archosaurs within the larger group Rauisuchia. The family name "Prestosuchidae" was established in 1966 by American paleontologist Alfred Romer. Prestosuchids were quadrupedal reptiles, medium to large in size, characterized by erect posture, large and narrow skull and large antorbital openings.

Attention was first brought to Batrachotomus in 1993 by Michael Parrish, a palaeontologist at Northern Illinois University. Parrish hypothesized that Batrachotomus (then "Kupferzellia") belonged to the family of Rauisuchidae, another clade of carnivorous reptiles, and species of Rauisuchus. However, the description of the braincase and a revisited cladistic analysis by Benton and Walker, showing the close relationships between Batrachotomus and Prestosuchus, led to the transfer of Batrachotomus to the family Prestosuchidae.

Sterling J. Nesbitt (2011) revised the classification of basal archosaurs, and using the most comprehensive phylogenetic analysis for this group (to date) found Prestosuchidae to be non-monophyletic. The members of this clade were recovered as basal loricatan, of which Batrachotomus was found to be the most derived i.e. most closely related to the clade containing Crocodylomorpha and Rauisuchidae. Subsequent derivatives of this analysis further support this hypothesis. In a yet to be formally published revision of Heptasuchus, a medium/large-sized (~6.5 m long) "rauisuchian" from the upper Chugwater Group of Wyoming, it was recovered as the sister taxon of Batrachotomus using a derivative of Nesbitt (2011) analysis.

The cladogram below follows an analysis by Sterling J. Nesbitt (2011):

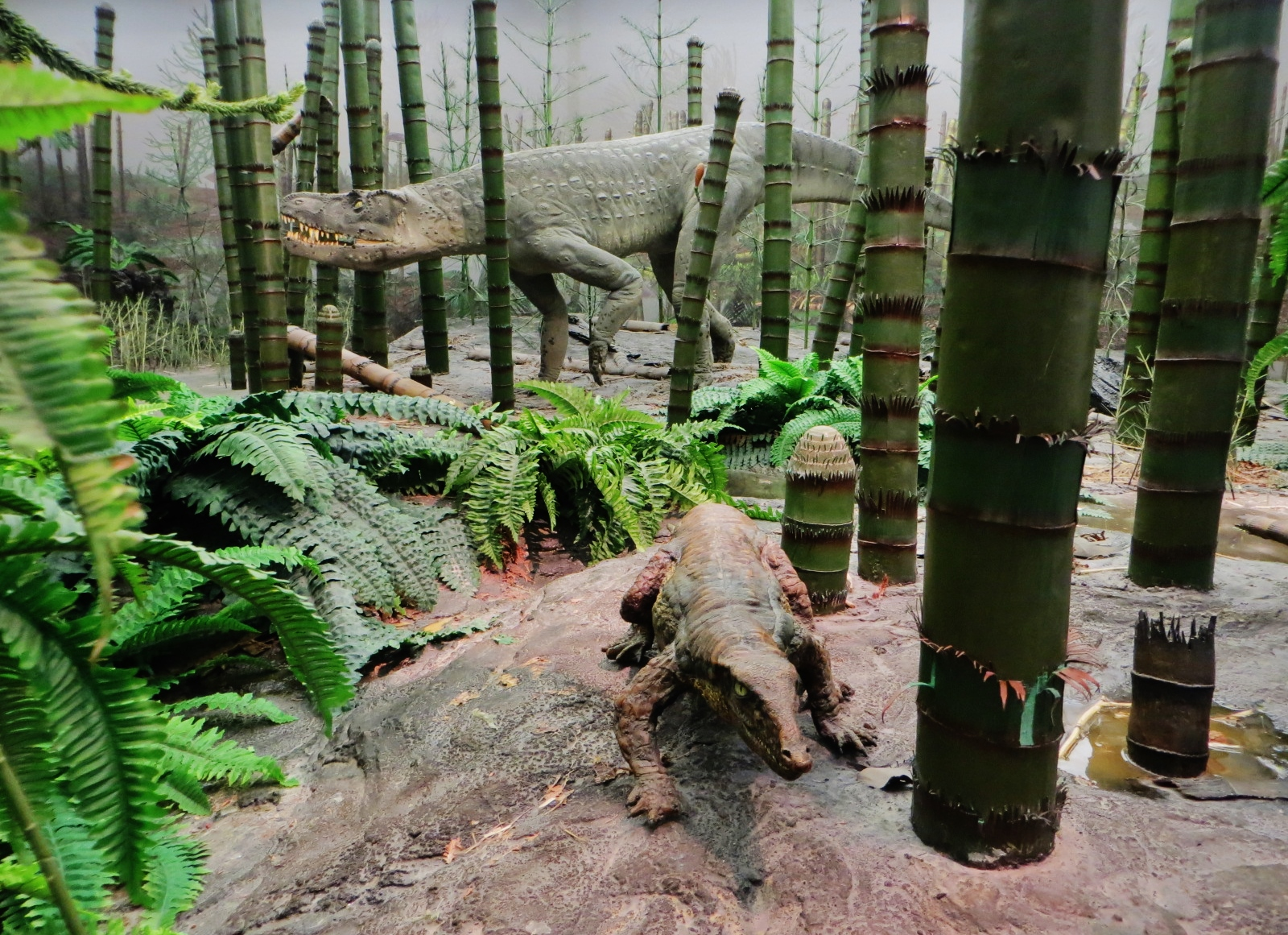
Model (background) in Triassic environment

- Archosauria
  - Avemetatarsalia
  - Pseudosuchia
    - Ornithosuchidae
    - Suchia
      - Gracilisuchus
      - Turfanosuchus
      - - Revueltosaurus
        - Aetosauria
      - - Ticinosuchus
        - Paracrocodylomorpha
          - Poposauroidea
          - Loricata
            - Prestosuchus
            - - Saurosuchus
              - - Batrachotomus
                - - Fasolasuchus
                  - - Rauisuchidae
                      - Rauisuchus
                      - - Polonosuchus
                        - Postosuchus
                    - Crocodylomorpha

== Paleoecology ==
Since 1977, the rich vertebrate fauna found at Baden-Württemberg reflects a moist region of the Middle Triassic in Germany. Along with Batrachotomus, palaeontologists recovered remains of fishes, amphibians, such as Gerrothorax and Mastodonsaurus, and even animals like nothosaurs and the distinct marine reptile Tanystropheus. The flora of the locality consisted of horsetails, ferns, cycads and conifers, suggesting that there was rich vegetation.
