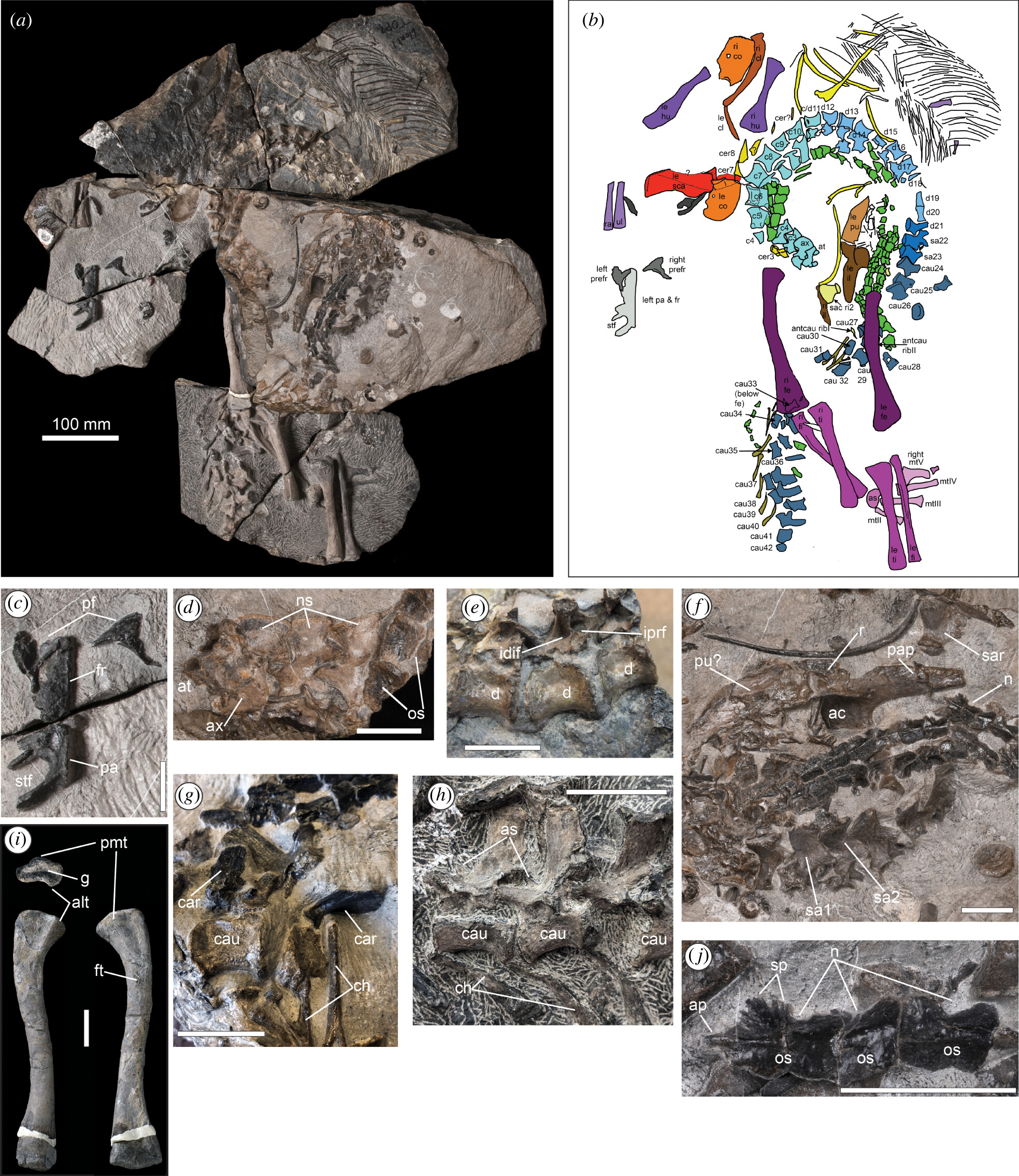
- Holotype of Benggwigwishingasuchus

Scientific classification
- Kingdom: Animalia
- Phylum: Chordata
- Class: Reptilia
- Clade: Pseudosuchia
- Clade: †Poposauroidea
- Genus: †Benggwigwishingasuchus; Smith et al., 2024
- Species: †B. eremicarminis

Binomial name
- †Benggwigwishingasuchus eremicarminis Smith et al., 2024

= Benggwigwishingasuchus =

Benggwigwishingasuchus Temporal range: Middle Triassic Anisian

Extinct genus of reptiles

Benggwigwishingasuchus is a genus of poposauroid pseudosuchian from the Anisian Favret Formation of Nevada. While the animal was found in marine deposits and possibly lived a coastal lifestyle, Benggwigwishingasuchus shows no clear adaptations towards marine life. The genus contains a single species: B. eremicarminis.

== Discovery and naming ==
The fossil remains of Benggwigwishingasuchus were discovered by Elaine Kramer and Monica Shaffer in the outcrops of the Fossil Hill Member of the Favret Formation, located in Pershing County, Nevada. The holotype specimen LACM-DI 158616 consists of a partially articulated skeleton which includes parts of the skull as well as most of the spinal column, limb girdles and limbs.

The genus name of Benggwigwishingasuchus combines the Shoshone term "Benggwi Gwishinga", meaning "to catch fish", with the Greek "suchus", a commonly used suffix among fossil pseudosuchians derived from the Egyptian deity Sobek. The species name meanwhile means "desert song", derived from the Latin "erema" and "carminis", and was chosen to honor the discoverers of the fossil, who are noted for their love of opera.

== Description ==
The skull of Benggwigwishingasuchus is poorly understood, with the holotype specimen only preserving the prefrontal bones, the parietal and the frontal bone. These elements do however showcase some features considered diagnostic for the genus, like the prominent supratemporal fossa. The prefrontals are also well developed, especially the ventral ramus, a peg of bone that is directed downwards and frames the front of the eye sockets. Usually, the lacrimal would also contribute to this area, but in Benggwigwishingasuchus this part of the prefrontal is so well developed that it is likely that it entirely excludes the lacrimals from forming part of the orbits, similar to the condition seen in Litorosuchus. Another diagnostic feature of the prefrontal is a crescent-shaped (semilunate) eminence that is situated down the middle of the ventral ramus.

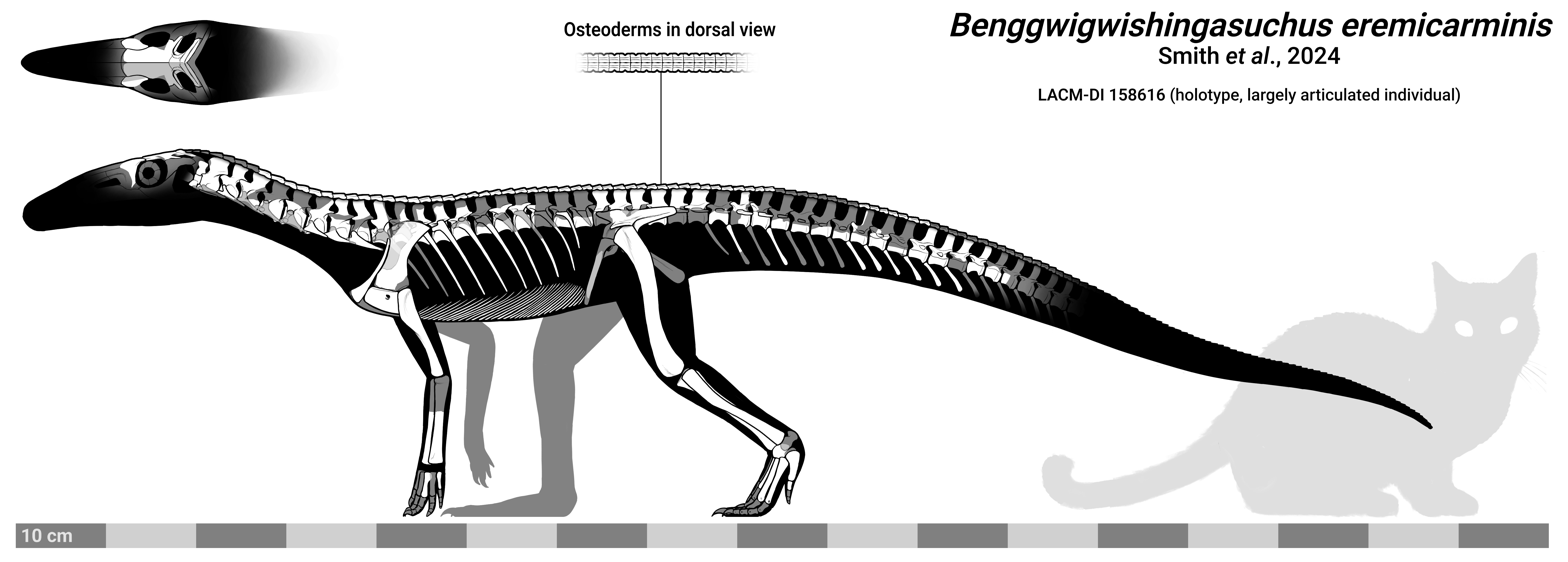
Skeletal reconstruction

Compared to the skull, the axial skeleton is understood much better, in large part due to the completeness of the cervical (neck) and dorsal (torso) vertebrae. Benggwigwishingasuchus has been noted for having both a large number of neck vertebrae and a low number of dorsal vertebrae, both ranging from about 10 to 11 individual bones, the ambiguity stemming from transitional vertebrae that could belong to either series. The neural spine of the axis, the second of the cervical vertebrae, is weakly convex and the middle vertebrae of the neck possess centra that are slightly elongated relative to those of the torso. This elongation is a feature shared not only by other poposauroids but also by members of the Avemetatarsalia (dinosaurs, pterosaurs and relatives). The dorsal vertebrae, though lacking pneumatic foramina, are laterally depressed and possess prominent laminae. These house deep infrazygapophseal and infraprezygapophyseal fossae, which is yet another feature common among poposauroids and avemetatarsalians. The sacral vertebrae are unfused and partially obscured, making it uncertain how many there are. At least two were identified, with the possibility of a third being present. The vertebrae that form the base of the tail are unique among archosaurs since they preserve spatulate ribs that appear asymmetrical when seen from above. Some of the neural spines of the mid-caudal vertebrae possess accessory laminar processes, a feature shared with paracrocodylomorphs and Ticinosuchus. The chevrons have split upper ends, as seen in Qianosuchus, Poposaurus and Gracilisuchus.

As with many other paracrocodylomorphs, the ilium possesses a second crest above the supracetabular crest, though, in the case of Benggwigwishingasuchus, it has been heavily weathered following preservation. The humerus has been noted for its expanded ends, both distal and proximal, and its relative shortness compared to the length of the femur. The femur bears two tubers on its inner (medial) side, one smaller and directed towards the front (a feature seen in the majority of archosaurs) and a second, larger tuber that faces towards the back. The proximal end of the femur, the region closest to the hip, bears a deep groove as in other paracrocodylomorphs and the head itself is oriented at a 45° angle relative to the opposing distal end. The fibula has a weakly sinusoidal shaft and ends in a symmetrical and weakly rounded distal end, a feature that Benggwigwishingasuchus shares with other poposauroids. The metatarsals, the bones that make up the middle of the foot, show some atypical anatomy among archosaurs, with the fourth metatarsal being longer than both the third and second. The fifth metatarsal has a hooked proximal end and its underside features a robust tubercle similar to that of Nundasuchus. The proximal-most phalanx of the fifth toe is robust and roughly as long as it is wide.

Unlike derived poposauroids like Poposaurus, Benggwigwishingasuchus still retains its osteoderm armour, which is arranged in a simple paramedial double-row as in many pseudosuchians. The osteoderm pairs do not correlate 1:1 with the underlying vertebrae and instead, each vertebra is covered by multiple pairs, similar to Ticinosuchus, Qianosuchus and gracilisuchids. The individual osteoderms are exact mirrors of each other and are nearly square up until the sacrum. The edges of the osteoderms in Benggwigwishingasuchus are concave due to prominent indentations that give them an hourglass shape. The edges of the osteoderms are further marked by a series of irregular spikes and crenulations, which bear resemblance to those of some phytosaurs and Litorosuchus.

Benggwigwishingasuchus was a medium-sized paracrocodylomorph, reaching a total body length of approximately 1.5 m (4 ft 11 in).

== Phylogeny ==
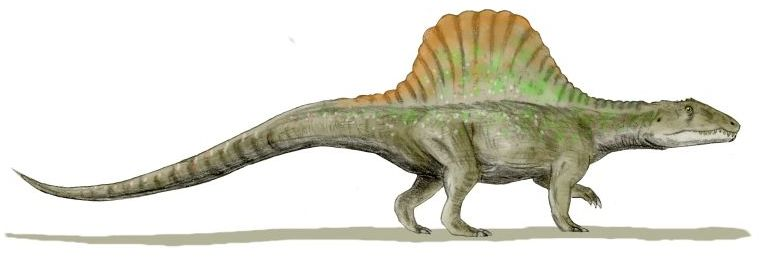
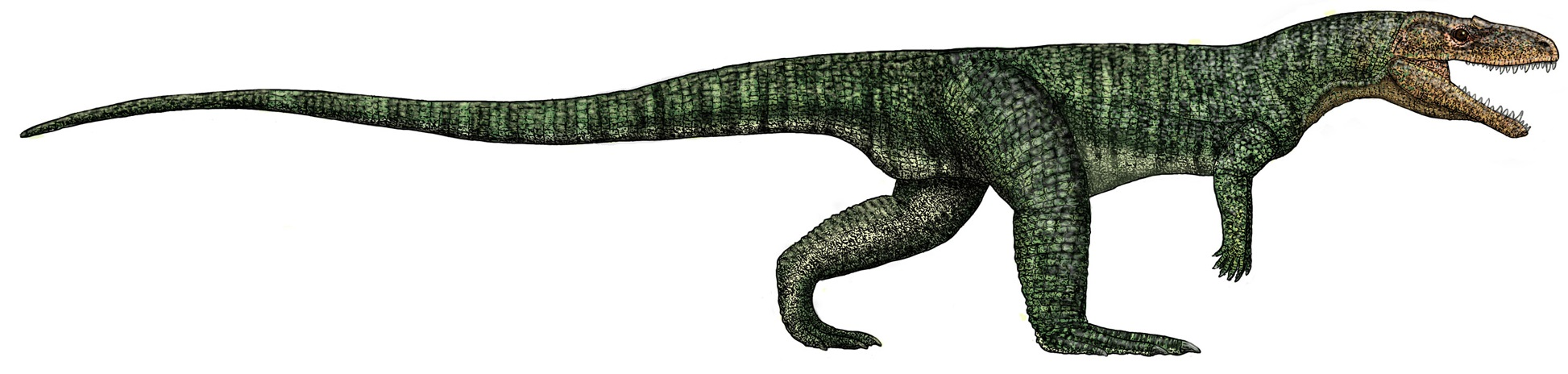
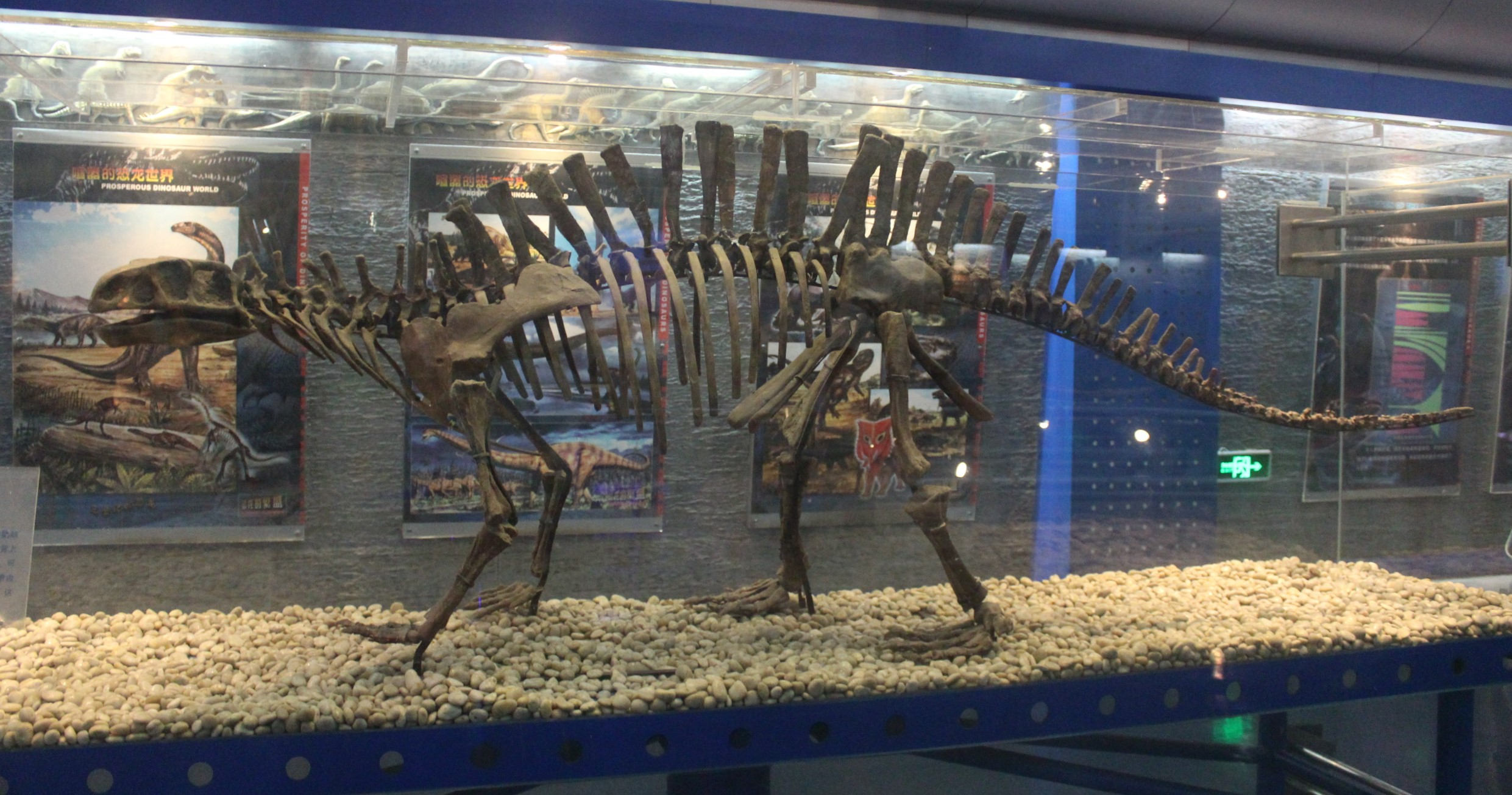
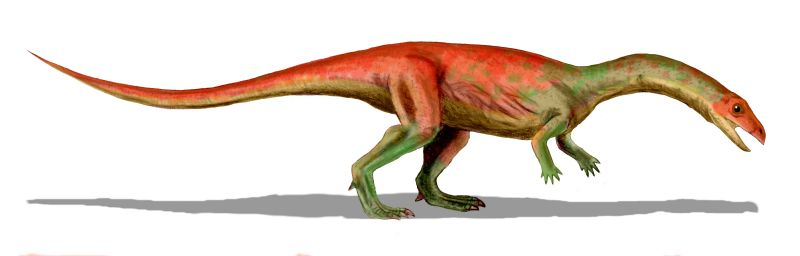
Benggwigwishingasuchus is a basal member of the Poposauroidea, a group that includes taxa like Arizonasaurus, Poposaurus, Lotosaurus and Effigia.

The phylogenetic analysis published in the type description of Benggwigwishingasuchus recovered it as a member of the Poposauroidea, a group of highly diverse paracrocodylomorphs that form the sister clade to Loricata. Nathan Smith and colleagues recovered poposauroids in a polytomy with loricatans as well as the genera Stagonosuchus and Mambawakale, though both of them have been recovered as poposauroids themselves in other phylogenies. Within the clade Benggwigwishingasuchus is recovered as one of the most basal taxa, more derived than Mandasuchus but more basal than Qianosuchus.

- - Paracrocodylomorpha
    - Stagonosuchus
    - Mambawakale
    - Poposauroidea
      - Mandasuchus
      - - Benggwigwishingasuchus
        - - Qianosuchus
          - - - Xilousuchus
              - Arizonasaurus
            - - Poposaurus
              - - Lotosaurus
                - - Sillosuchus
                  - - Shuvosaurus
                    - Effigia
    - Loricata

== Paleobiology ==
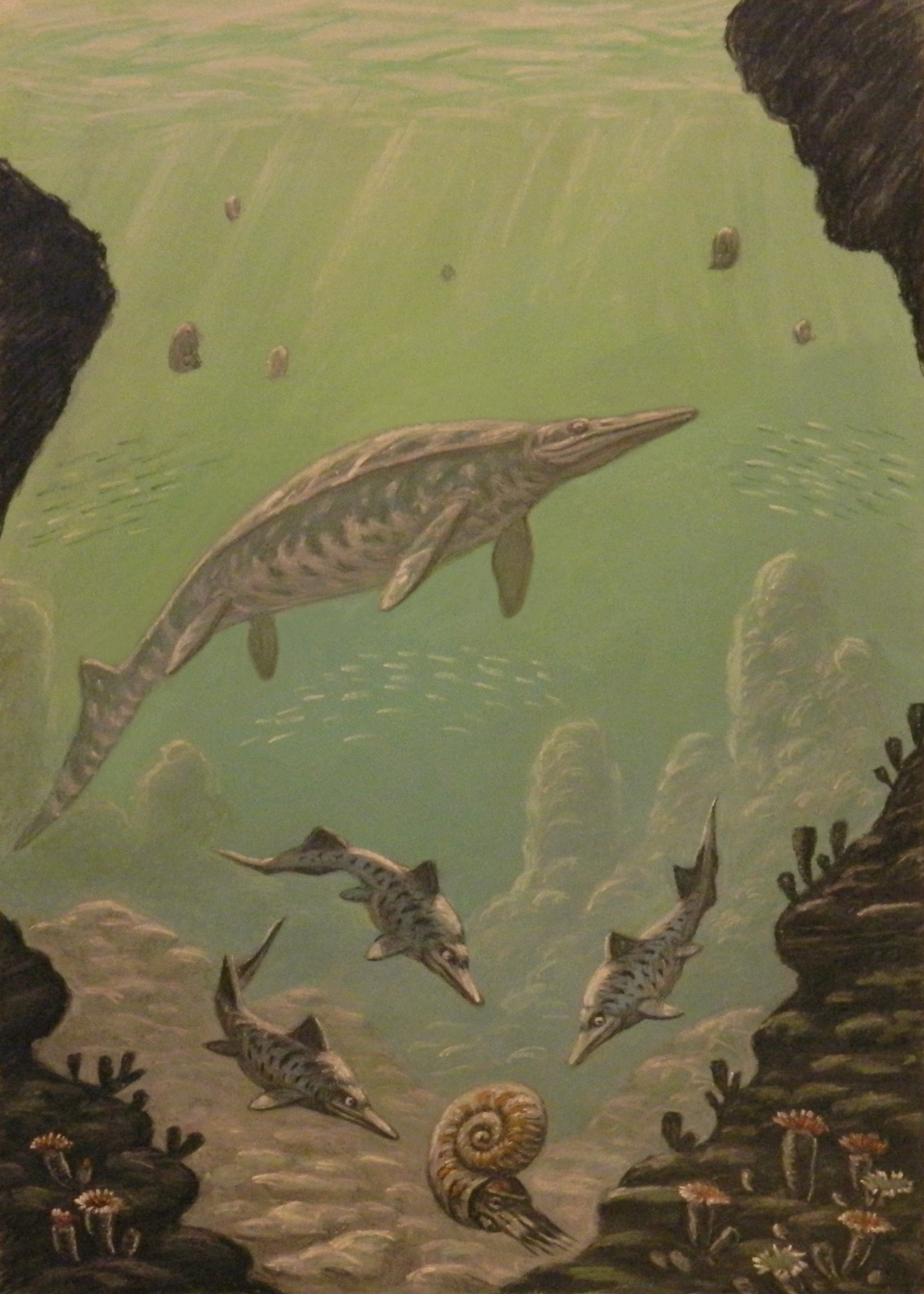
Benggwigwishingasuchus was found in the Fossil Hill Member of Nevada, a rock unit best known for its ichthyosaur fossils.

=== Growth rate ===
The histology of Benggwigwishingasuchus resembles that of crocodylomorphs more so than that of poposauroids, which indicates that it grew rather slowly compared to more derived members of its clade. Evidence further suggests that Benggwigwishingasuchus was ectothermic and that its growth was highly dependant on environmental factors. Given the presence of multiple resting lines in the bone, this would suggest a seasonal environment. The inferred ectothermic metabolism is further supported by the histology, showing that the 8 year old individual was relatively small but still growing.

=== Lifestyle ===
Benggwigwishingasuchus is known from the Anisian Fossil Hill Member of the Favret Formation, which is thought to have been deposited around 10 km (6.2 mi) off the Panthalassic coast of Pangea. The formation is chiefly known for preserving the remains of enormous ichthyosaurs, yet lacks shallow-water inhabitants or coastal animals, except for Benggwigwishingasuchus, which Smith and colleagues hypothesize to have been a coastal animal. In this case, Benggwigwishingasuchus may be a panthalassic equivalent to some pseudosuchians found along the Tethys coast, namely Qianosuchus from the Guanling Formation of China and Ticinosuchus from Switzerland.

Despite the circumstances of its fossilisation, there is little evidence to suggest that Benggwigwishingasuchus was a marine animal. The bone density of the femoral midshaft suggests that it was not a diver and the overall ratio between the length of the femur and the humerus suggests a terrestrial lifestyle. This is supported by the osteohistology, which revealed no signs of the animal possessing any adaptation to secondarily aquatic habits. However, the posture of the fossil with a pronounced arched back, similar to what is seen in Qianosuchus, would suggest that it was not transported over any long distances following the death of the individual, meaning that it could have died near the coast or that it was swept out to sea and died there while foraging. Following the work of Motani and Vermeij, Smith and colleagues suggest that Benggwigwishingasuchus was only in the early stages of adapting to marine life, specifically by foraging directly in the sea while not consuming fresh water directly.

Such a lifestyle may have been more widespread across Triassic paracrocodylomorphs, as Benggwigwishingasuchus, Qianosuchus and Ticinosuchus do not form a distinct clade and thus likely acquired their adaptations independently from one another. This lifestyle may also be shared by some even more distantly related archosaurs such as Diandongosuchus, Litorosuchus and Heteropelta. Smith and colleagues reason that archosaurs may have been more predisposed to exploiting such niches, but also argue that these instances highlight the conclusion reached by Motani and Vermeij, which was that although many animals show early adaptations for and signs of transitioning to marine habitats, few fully transition to a marine lifestyle.
