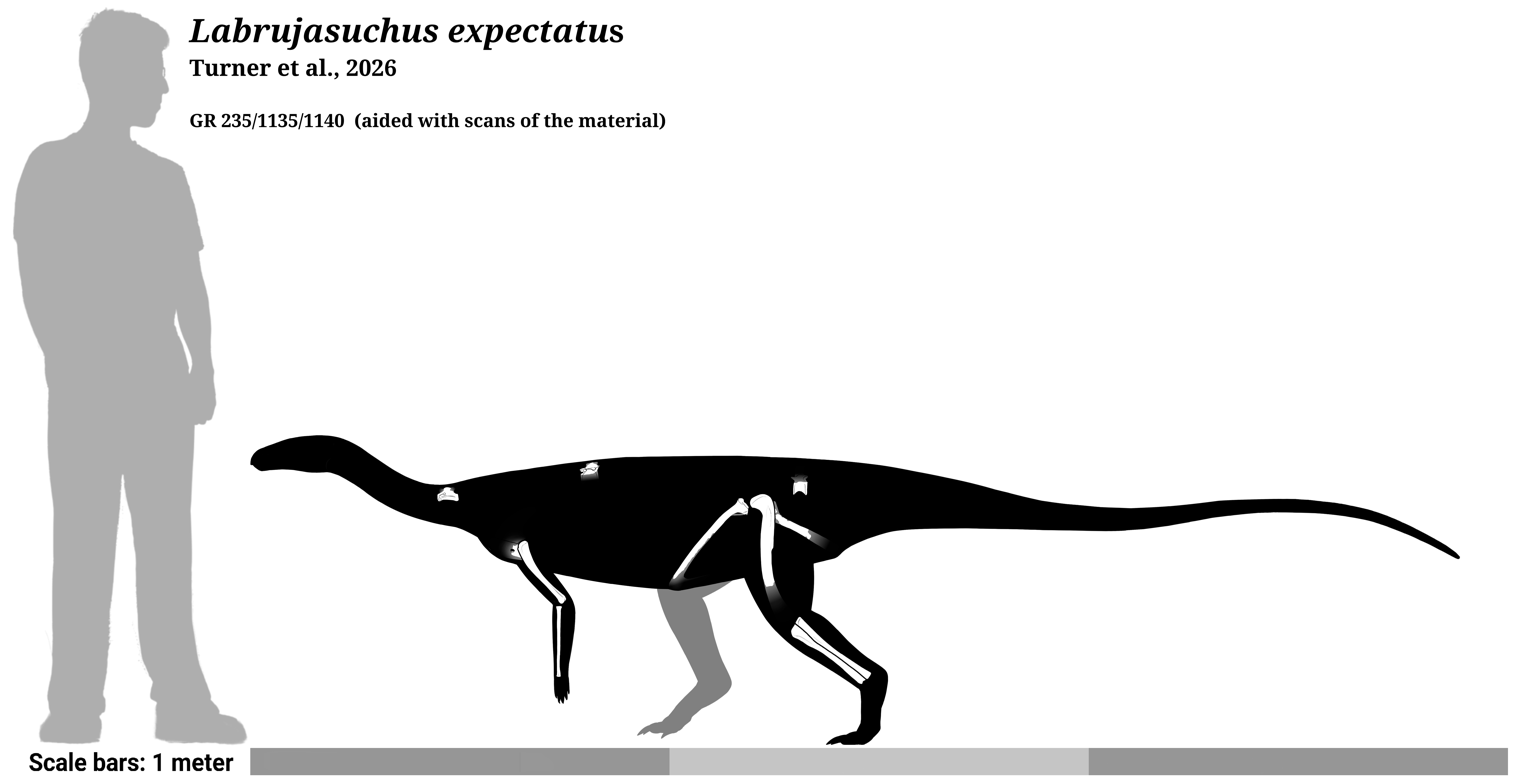
- Skeletal reconstruction and size comparison showcasing known remains

Scientific classification
- Kingdom: Animalia
- Phylum: Chordata
- Class: Reptilia
- Clade: Pseudosuchia
- Clade: †Poposauroidea
- Family: †Shuvosauridae
- Genus: †Labrujasuchus; Turner et al., 2026
- Species: †L. expectatus

Binomial name
- †Labrujasuchus expectatus Turner et al., 2026

= Labrujasuchus =

Labrujasuchus Temporal range: Late Triassic, Norian

Genus of reptile

Labrujasuchus is a genus of shuvosaurid poposauroid from the Late Triassic Petrified Forest Member of the Chinle Formation, New Mexico. It is known from a partial associated skeleton including forelimb material, a few vertebrae as well as parts of the hindlimbs and pubic region. In addition to this, a number of other remains found throughout the Hayden Quarry have also been tentatively assigned to this taxon. The anatomy of Labrujasuchus closely resembles other North American shuvosaurids, namely Effigia and Shuvosaurus, with which it forms a clade to the exclusion of the South American genus Sillosuchus. This similarity extends beyond what is expected of closely related forms and actually factors into the idea that derived shuvosaurids were, despite their distinct morphology, anatomically conservative, changing only subtly across their evolution.

== History and naming ==
Labrujasuchus was described based on a partial skeleton discovered in 2006 consisting of an assortment of associated postcranial remains including elements of the forelimbs and shoulder girdle, a greater amount of pubic and hindlimb material as well as the parts of some vertebrae. The holotype has been collected from the Hayden Quarry at Ghost Ranch, which corresponds to the late Triassic Petrified Forest Member of the Chinle Formation. The Member is divided into three distinct paleochannels, labeled H4, H2 and H3, with the holotype of Labrujasuchus coming from H2, which has been dated to the mid Norian (ca. 211 Mya), though shuvosaurid fossils are known from all three channels. Turner and colleagues subsequently referred a number of other Hayden Quarry shuvosaurid fossils to Labrujasuchus, including a left coracoid from H3 and a left tibia from H4 as well as several neck vertebrae and a pair of ischia that cannot be confidently assigned to the genus.

The name Labrujasuchus derives from an alternate name of the Ghost Ranch area, which is also known as "Ranchos de los Brujos" in Spanish ("Ranch of the Witches"), and the Greek word "souchos" meaning "crocodile". The species name "expectatus" meanwhile was chosen to reflect the fact that shuvosaurid material was long expected from the Hayden Quarry before the taxon's description.

== Description ==
Although shuvosaurids are morphologically very different from other pseudosuchians and even other poposauroids, the recognized members of this family are only distinguished by much more subtle features, displaying low rates of morphological evolution. This is exemplified by the fact that Effigia, which lived around 205 million years ago, is morphologically very similar to Shuvosaurus, which appears in the fossil record around 10 million years earlier. Labrujasuchus bridges the gap between the two stratigraphically and like them displays a fairly conservative anatomy for this group.

More specifically, Labrujasuchus is only distinguished from Shuvosaurus by a handfull of features including the distal end of the tibia. The posteromedial condyle of the distal tibia extends further and the anterolateral condyle is set apart from the bone's shaft by a sharp lip, both features do not occur in Shuvosaurus with its smoother distal tibia and instead come closer to the condition seen in Effigia. On the humerus Labrujasuchus presents a large internal tuberosity, referred to by some authors as a medial process. This process is distinctly larger than in Shuvosaurus, but once again resembles that of Effigia. Effigia meanwhile differs from Labrujasuchus among other things in the fact that the distal condyles of the humerus, which would articulate with the lower arm bones, are almost equal to each other while the opposite end of the bone, the humeral head, is crossed by a shallow groove that's also present in Shuvosaurus.

What also sets apart Labrujasuchus from Effigia is the anatomy of the coracoid. In the former the coracoids contribution to the glenoid fossa, where the coracoid connects to the upper arm and shoulder blade, is parallelogram shaped. Ventral to the glenoid fossa the bone bears a deep notch, which gives rise to a pronounced postglenoid process that is curved upwards. The coracoid foramen of Labrujasuchus actually differs from both Effigia and Shuvosaurus, being larger and shifted posteroventrally compared to that of the former and shifted posteriorly compared to that of the latter. Other autapomorphies in addition to the dorsally curved postglenoid process include the fact that the head of the humerus is best described as teardrop-shaped as opposed to D-shaped; the hypertrophied ventral crest of the ischium, which makes the bone deeper than wide unlike in other North American shuvosaurids; and the presence of an anterior groove on the fibula just medial to the iliofibularis trochanter. While Effigia, Shuvosaurus and Labrujasuchus all share the presence of posterior protuberance on the proximal articular surface of the humerus, it is only in Labrujasuchus that this structure is displaced outward (laterally), while in the other two its described as symmetrical.

== Phylogeny ==
A phylogenetic analysis placed Labrujasuchus in the family Shuvosauridae within Poposauroidea, a group of early paracrocodylomorphs that superficially resemble ornithomimosaurian dinosaurs. Within their results, the family consists of four members, Sillosuchus from the Carnian of Argentina, as well as Labrujasuchus, Shuvosaurus, and Effigia, which are known from the southern United States. The analysis by Turner and colleagues did not include the coeval shuvosaurid Sonselasuchus, named two months prior to Labrujasuchus. Within Shuvosauridae, Sillosuchus was recovered as the sister taxon to the remaining three forms, which were grouped in an unresolved polytomy as no single relationship appeared in the majority of most parsimonious trees. In each instance that one of the three North American forms claded closer with one of its relatives this grouping was based on a single feature.

- Paracrocodylomorpha
  - Poposauroidea
    - - Xilousuchus
      - Arizonasaurus
    - - Poposaurus
      - - Lotosaurus
        - Shuvosauridae
          - Sillosuchus
          - - Effigia
            - Labrujasuchus
            - Shuvosaurus
  - Loricata
