= Sonselasuchus =

Sonselasuchus Temporal range: Late Triassic (mid-Norian), ~215–213 Ma
- Holotype maxilla

Scientific classification
- Kingdom: Animalia
- Phylum: Chordata
- Class: Reptilia
- Clade: Pseudosuchia
- Clade: †Poposauroidea
- Family: †Shuvosauridae
- Genus: †Sonselasuchus; Smith & Sidor, 2026
- Species: †S. cedrus

Binomial name
- †Sonselasuchus cedrus Smith & Sidor, 2026

Genus of shuvosaurid pseudosuchians

Sonselasuchus is an extinct genus of poposauroid pseudosuchian (crocodile-line reptile) in the family Shuvosauridae. It is known from the Late Triassic (Norian age) Chinle Formation of Arizona, United States. The genus contains a single species, Sonselasuchus cedrus, known from a bone bed of fossil material belonging to at least 36 individuals.

== Discovery and naming ==
The Sonselasuchus fossil material is all known from the Kaye Quarry (locality PFV 410)—named for Tom Kaye, who discovered it in 2014—in the Jim Camp Wash beds. This fossil site, which has yielded the bones of many different vertebrate clades, represents outcrops of the Sonsela Member of the Chinle Formation, located in Petrified Forest National Park in Apache County, Arizona, United States. More than 950 disarticulated and non-associated (not in anatomical position) bones referable to a shuvosaurid were collected from the Kaye Quarry, together belonging to at least 36 individual animals. Bones of the entire skeleton are represented, including several isolated bones of the skull, many vertebrae from the cervical (neck), dorsal (trunk), sacrum, and caudal (tail) regions, and forelimb, pectoral girdle, hindlimb, and pelvic girdle elements.

In 2026, Elliott Armour Smith and Christian A. Sidor described Sonselasuchus cedrus as a new genus and species of shuvosaurid pseudosuchian based on these fossil remains, establishing PEFO 47305/UWBM 119436, a left maxilla (upper jaw bone) as the holotype specimen. The generic name, Sonselasuchus, referencing the geologic member of the Chinle Formation from which it is known, in turn derived from the Sonsela Buttes on the Navajo Nation in Arizona. This is combined with the Latinized Greek word soûkhos (suchus), derived from the Greek name of Sobek, the crocodile-headed deity of Ancient Egyptian myth. The specific name, cedrus, is also the genus name of the common cedar tree (Cedrus; also in reference to juniper trees native to the region, which are placed in the genus Juniperus), alluding to Cedar Tank, a geographic feature near the type locality.

== Description ==
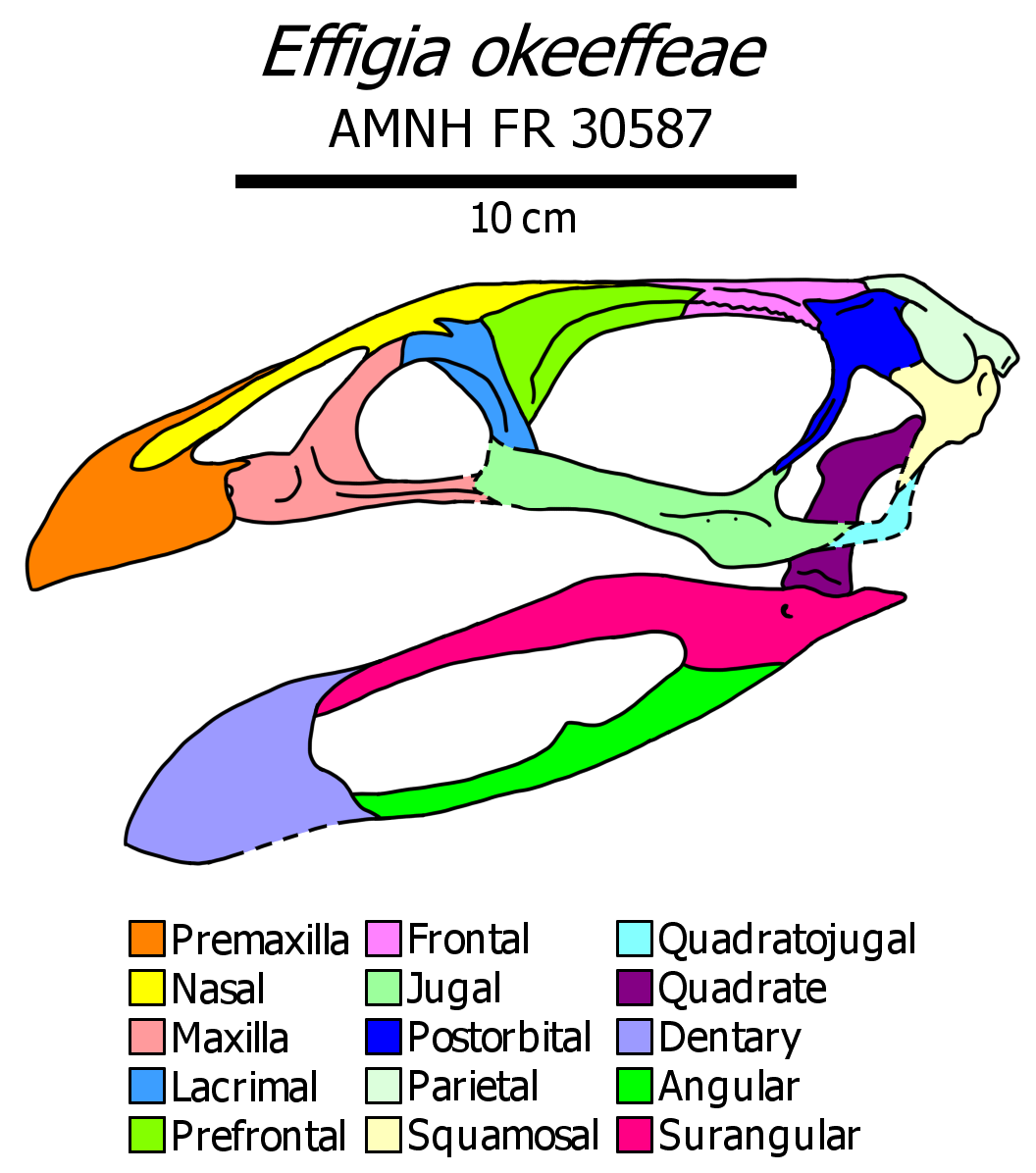
Reconstructed skull of the closely related Effigia; note the edentulous and beaked snout

As a shuvosaurid, Sonselasuchus exhibits an unusual combination of anatomical traits, many of which are convergently similar to ornithomimid theropod dinosaurs, despite their closer affinities to crocodilians and their extinct ancestors. These traits include a bipedal posture, enlarged pubic boot, large orbits, and edentulous (toothless) jaws. The snout may have borne a keratinous rhamphotheca (beak), similar to turtles, birds, and some non-avian dinosaurs. The premaxilla, maxilla, and dentary—the bones that normally bear teeth—instead exhibit a tomium, or sharp cutting edge.

The abundance of limb bones found that belong to Sonselasuchus allowed Smith & Sidor (2026) to determine the proportional change of the limbs through ontogeny. They determined that there was likely a negative allometric trajectory of the forelimb dimensions relative to the hindlimb. This would indicate a shift in the mode of locomotion; the animal would be quadrupedal when immature, shifting to bipedalism at a later ontogenetic stage.

== Classification ==
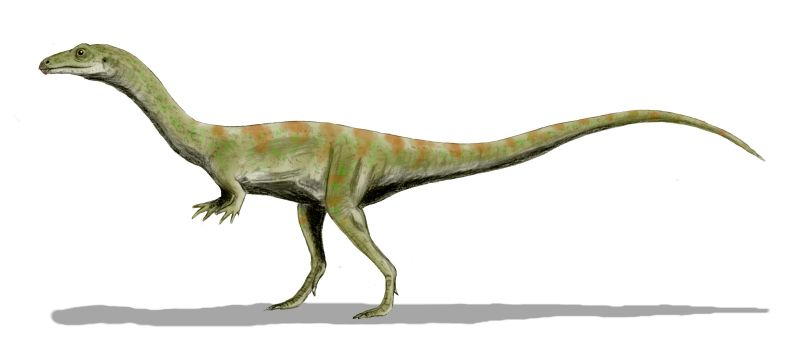
Life restoration of the closely related Shuvosaurus

To test the affinities and relationships of Sonselasuchus, Smith and Sidor (2026) included it in an updated version of the phylogenetic matrix of Nesbitt et al. (2020). This dataset recovered Sonselasuchus as a member of the poposauroid clade Shuvosauridae, in an unresolved polytomy including Effigia and Shuvosaurus, which are known from the Late Triassic of New Mexico and Texas, respectively. Together, this grouping of North American shuvosaurids is referred to as 'Node A', to the exclusion of the South American Sillosuchus from Argentina. The results of their phylogenetic analysis are displayed in the cladogram below:

- Poposauroidea
  - Qianosuchus mixtus
  - - - Arizonasaurus babbitti
      - Xilousuchus sapingensis
    - - Poposaurus gracilis
      - - Lotosaurus adentus
        - Shuvosauridae
          - Sillosuchus longicervix
          - 'Node A'
            - Effigia okeeffeae
            - Shuvosaurus inexpectatus
            - Sonselasuchus cedrus
