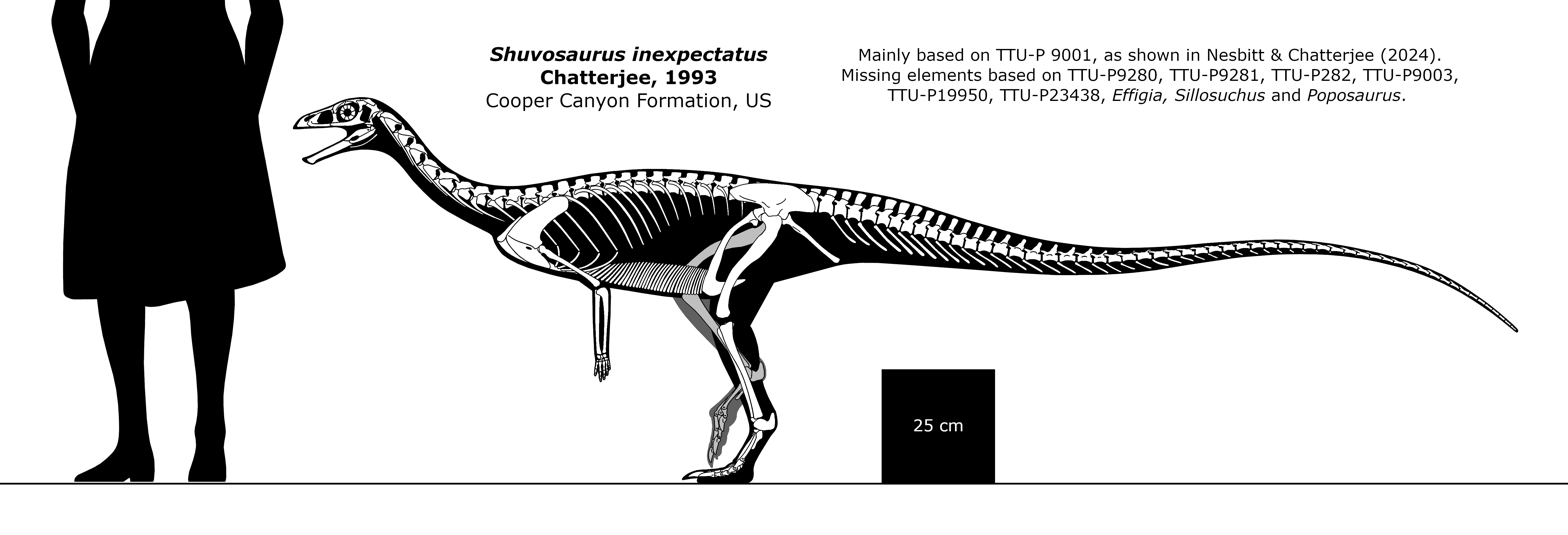
- Skeletal reconstruction of Shuvosaurus inexpectatus
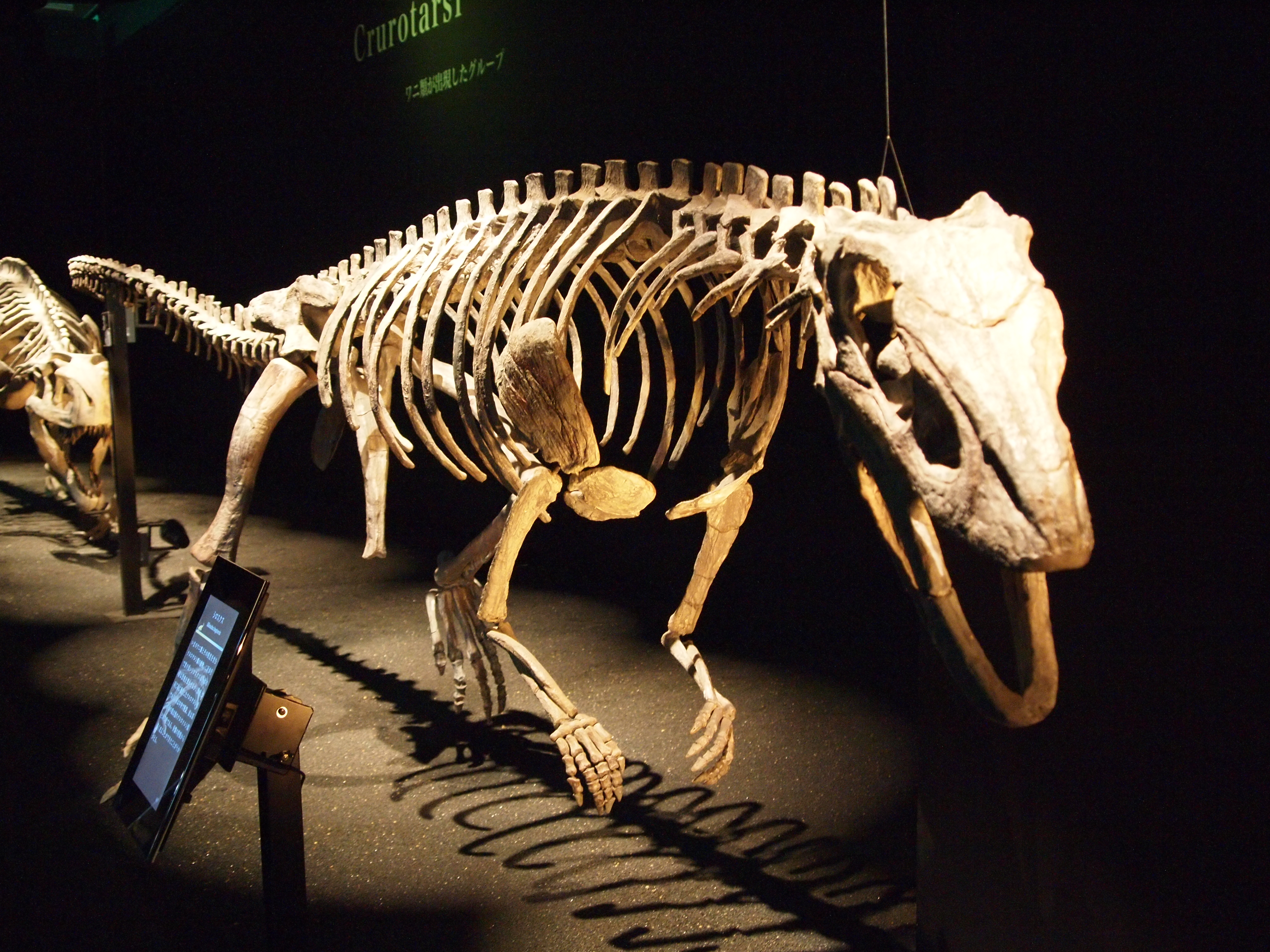
- Mounted skeleton of Sillosuchus longicervix in Japan

Scientific classification
- Kingdom: Animalia
- Phylum: Chordata
- Class: Reptilia
- Clade: Pseudosuchia
- Clade: †Poposauroidea
- Family: †Shuvosauridae; Chatterjee, 1993

Genera
- †Effigia; †Labrujasuchus; †Shuvosaurus; †Sillosuchus; †Sonselasuchus

= Shuvosauridae =

Shuvosauridae Temporal range: Late Triassic, 235–201.3 Ma

Extinct family of reptiles

Shuvosauridae is an extinct family of theropod-like pseudosuchians within the clade Poposauroidea. Shuvosaurids existed in North America (United States) and South America (Argentina) during the Late Triassic period (late Carnian to Rhaetian stages). Shuvosauridae was named by Sankar Chatterjee in 1993 to include the genus Shuvosaurus.

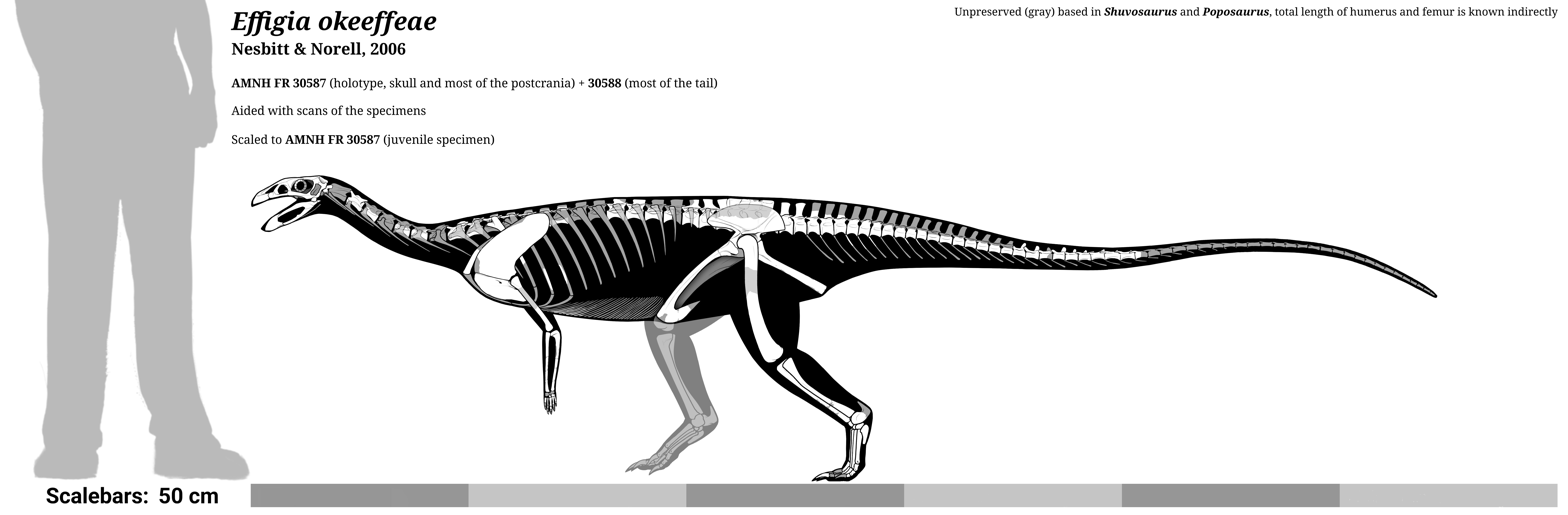
Skeletal reconstruction of Effigia okeeffeae

In a 2007 study Chatterjeea was demonstrated to be a junior synonym of Shuvosaurus, and the therein cladistic analysis found that Shuvosaurus, Effigia and Sillosuchus all form a closely related group. However, this group was left nameless, and simply referred to as Group Y. However, in accordance with ICZN rules of naming priority Shuvosauridae has priority over Chatterjeeidae (Shuvosauridae being named in 1993, while Chatterjeeidae was named in 1995). In 2011, Sterling J. Nesbitt proposed a new definition to this clade: "The least inclusive clade containing Shuvosaurus inexpectatus Chatterjee, 1993, and Sillosuchus longicervix Alcober and Parrish, 1997".
