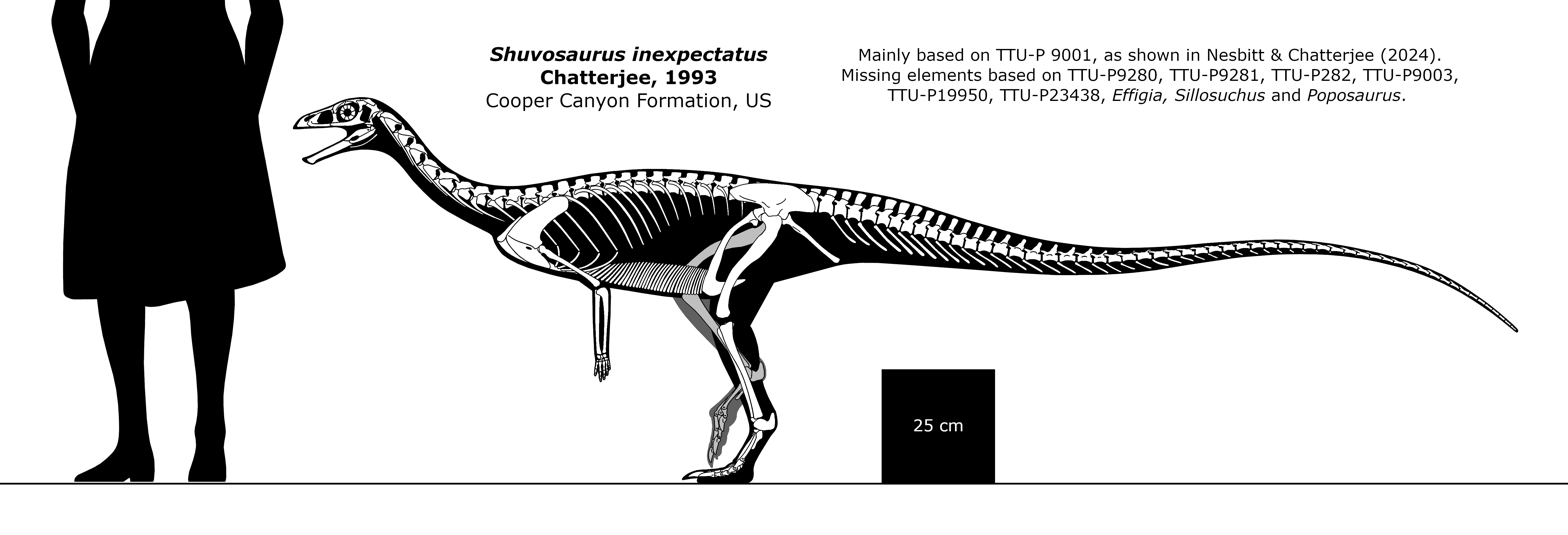
- Skeletal reconstruction of Shuvosaurus
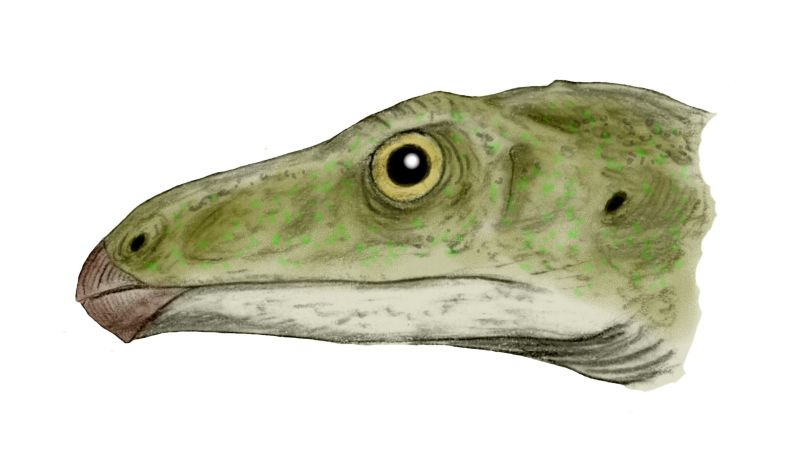
- Restoration of the head

Scientific classification
- Kingdom: Animalia
- Phylum: Chordata
- Class: Reptilia
- Clade: Pseudosuchia
- Clade: Paracrocodylomorpha
- Clade: †Poposauroidea
- Family: †Shuvosauridae
- Genus: †Shuvosaurus; Chatterjee, 1993
- Species: †S. inexpectatus

Binomial name
- †Shuvosaurus inexpectatus Chatterjee, 1993

Synonyms
- Chatterjeea Long & Murry, 1995; Chatterjeea elegans Long & Murry, 1995

= Shuvosaurus =

Shuvosaurus Temporal range: Late Triassic, Norian ~220–219 Ma

Genus of beaked reptile

Shuvosaurus (meaning "Shuvo [Chatterjee]'s lizard") is a genus of beaked, bipedal poposauroid pseudosuchian from the Late Triassic (early to middle Norian) of western Texas. Despite superficially resembling a theropod dinosaur, especially the ostrich-like ornithomimids, it is instead more closely related to living crocodilians than to dinosaurs. Shuvosaurus is known by the type and only species S. inexpectatus, and is closely related to the very similar Effigia within the clade Shuvosauridae. Shuvosaurus was originally described from a restored skull and very few fragmentary postcranial bones as a probable ornithomimosaur, or at least a very ornithomimosaur-like early theropod. The true pseudosuchian affinities of Shuvosaurus were only recognised after the discovery of Effigia linked the skull of Shuvosaurus with similar poposauroid skeletal remains found in the same quarry.

== History of discovery ==
=== Initial interpretation ===
Fossils of Shuvosaurus were first discovered and collected in 1984, but were not described until 1993 by palaeontologist Sankar Chatterjee. Chatterjee recognized its distinctiveness in the late 1980s during preparation by his younger son Shuvo Chatterjee, for whom he named it after (combining "Shuvo" with the Ancient Greek σαῦρος (sauros), meaning "lizard"). These original fossils consisted of the partially disarticulated remains of three skulls and a partial lower jaw (the holotype TTU (Texas Tech University)-P9280 and paratypes TTU-P9281 and TTU-P9282), as well as a partial atlas and fragmentary vertebra, scapula and an informally referred tibia. Of these postcranial bones only the atlas belongs to Shuvosaurus, the others have since been reidentified as belonging to an azendohsaurid, an ornithodiran and a neotheropod dinosaur, respectively.

The fossils were collected from the Post Quarry (a.k.a. the Miller Quarry) of the lower Cooper Canyon Formation (Note: In regional Dockum Group stratigraphic nomenclature, the lower, middle, and upper units of the Texas Cooper Canyon Formation are alternatively split up and equated to their lithostratigraphic equivalents in the Texas panhandle and New Mexico; the Tecovas, Trujillo, and Bull Canyon formations, respectively. The Post Quarry is then sometimes assigned to the Tecovas Formation.) (Dockum Group) near Post, Garza County, Texas, US, and was one of many new discoveries made at this quarry in the 1980s by Chatterjee and his team from the Texas Tech University (such as Technosaurus and Postosuchus). Although precise dating is lacking for much of the Dockum Group, including the Post Quarry, it has been correlated to the Adamanian teilzone, a local biostratigraphic unit in the southwestern United States—that has elsewhere been dated to the early to middle Norian stage of the Late Triassic, between 224–215 million years old, with correlations using phytosaurs suggesting an age of roughly ~220-219 million years. The fossils of Shuvosaurus were preserved in a bonebed containing the remains of at least nine partially articulated and associated skeletons alongside the skeleton of a Postosuchus, with a minimum total of 14 individuals indicated by the number of right partial femurs collected.

Upon its description, Chatterjee tentatively interpreted Shuvosaurus as a Triassic member of Ornithomimosauria, a group of theropod dinosaurs otherwise known only from the Cretaceous, due to similar construction of the skull, including toothless jaws and large eye sockets. This is reflected in the species name, inexpectatus, for the unexpected nature of finding a toothless, ornithomimid-like skull in Late Triassic deposits. As with the contemporary purported avian Protoavis and Postosuchus, (Note: Postosuchus was originally proposed by Chatterjee to be ancestral to the Cretaceous tyrannosaurs and argued that they evolved from Triassic "rauisuchians", invoking a polyphyletic origin of "carnosaurs" (at the time all large meat-eating theropods).) Chatterjee's proposed affinities of a Late Triassic Post Quarry taxon to Cretaceous coelurosaurs invoked a long ghost lineage and was consequently greeted with skepticism by other researchers (such as Halszka Osmólska in 1997).

=== "Chatterjeea" ===
The Shuvosaurus skulls were found mixed in with postcranial remains of small pseudosuchians from the Post Quarry—all lacking heads—which Chatterjee had previously described as juveniles of the large predatory rauisuchid Postosuchus (of which the fossils were also associated with) in 1985. However, in a 1995 monograph on Late Triassic tetrapods from the American Southwest, Robert Long and Philip Murry regarded this material as so "radically different" from Postosuchus that they identified it as a new taxon of gracile "rauisuchian" allied to poposaurids (i.e. Poposaurus) which they named Chatterjeea elegans—named after Sankar Chatterjee and from Latin elegans for "very fine" or "beautiful".

In the same publication, however, Long and Murry raised the possibility that Shuvosaurus and Chatterjeea were in fact the same animal, noting the close association of their remains, lack of any apparent ornithomimosaurian postcrania otherwise referable to Shuvosaurus in the quarry, and that the available material for Shuvosaurus and the Chatterjeea did not overlap (one known by heads, the other skeletons).

Following Long and Murry (1995), opinions were divided on the identity of Shuvosaurus and its proposed synonymy with Chatterjeea. Notable among them, Oliver Rauhut (1997, 2000, 2003) argued that Shuvosaurus was indeed a theropod and distinct from Chatterjeea, but that it was instead a specialised basal taxon convergent with ornithomimosaurs.

=== The discovery of Effigia ===
In the early 2000s, Sterling Nesbitt and Mark Norell prepared previously unopened plaster-jackets of an unknown archosaur collected from the Whitaker Quarry at Ghost Ranch which combined a Shuvosaurus-like skull with Chatterjeea-like postcrania that they named Effigia in 2006. This discovery showed that Shuvosaurus is more closely related to crocodilians and other pseudosuchians than dinosaurs, and that similarities between it and ornithomimids are indeed the result of convergent evolution, while simultaneously demonstrating that the bodies of Chatterjeea almost certainly belong to Shuvosaurus and therefore that the two are synonymous.

Shuvosaurus and Effigia are so anatomically similar that in 2007 Spencer Lucas and colleagues proposed that the two genera were synonymous, tentatively subsuming Effigia into Shuvosaurus as the species Shuvosaurus okeeffeae. This proposal has not been followed in subsequent research.

=== Redescriptions ===
Shuvosaurus itself would not be thoroughly re-examined for many years until late 2023 and early 2024, when two separate redescriptions were published independently. First, the skull was redescribed by Lehane (2023), based upon the work of his previously unpublished 2005 master's thesis. This study was followed shortly after by a complete skeletal osteology from Nesbitt and Chatterjee (2024). Although both were published closely together, the work in each was conducted independently and published in parallel. Notably, Nesbitt and Chatterjee (2024) provide novel interpretations of some of the cranial material, differing from those of previous authors, including Lehane (2023).

Many isolated shuvosaurid remains found in rocks of the southwestern US from throughout the Late Triassic have been referred to Shuvosaurus (including to Chatterjeea), namely from elsewhere in the Dockum Group and the Chinle Formation to the west. However, these referrals have been questioned after the discovery of Effigia, as it shows that many of the traits used to assign material to Shuvosaurus are only diagnostic of Shuvosauridae as a whole. Following their osteological description, Nesbitt and Chatterjee revised the taxonomic diagnosis of Shuvosaurus in 2024 and in doing so restricted Shuvosaurus to the type and associated material of the Post Quarry bonebed alone, as isolated bones cannot be reliably differentiated between the two genera.

== Classification ==
=== As an ornithomimosaur ===
Upon its description Shuvosaurus was tentatively classified as a member of the coelurosaurian theropod clade Ornithomimosauria based on superficial similarity of its reconstructed skull. In an early report of its discovery at the annual Society of Vertebrate Paleontology meeting in 1991 Chatterjee even explicitly referred Shuvosaurus to the derived ornithomimosaur family Ornithomimidae. However, in its formal printed description in 1993 he instead more cautiously referred it to the broader group Ornithomimosauria and therein erected the monotypic family Shuvosauridae. This was in part based on the presence of at least two inferred primitively ancestral (i.e. plesiomorphic) traits (no parasphenoid capsule and a smaller brain cavity) compared to Cretaceous ornithomimosaurs, as well as its general distinctiveness relative to them.

Theropod phylogeny of Chatterjee (1993)

- Theropoda
  - Ceratosauria
  - Tetanurae
    - Carnosauria
    - Coelurosauria
      - Ornithomimosauria
        Shuvosaurus
      - Maniraptora
        - Troodontidae
        - "Group A"
          - Dromaeosauridae
          - Aves

Representation of the cladogram and classification of Shuvosaurus of Chatterjee (1993)

Notably, despite these traits and its much older age, Chatterjee regarded Shuvosaurus as a very derived ornithomimosaur and compared it favourably with ornithomimids, noting a particular resemblance to Dromiceiomimus and a similar braincase construction to that of Struthiomimus. Furthermore, he noted that two other Cretaceous ornithomimosaur families, Garudimimidae and Harpymimidae (each themselves monotypic), paradoxically possessed different plesiomorphic features of their own that were already derived and ornithomimid-like in the Triassic Shuvosaurus. This further complicated the relationship of Shuvosaurus to other ornithomimosaurs.

Although Chatterjee argued in favour of Shuvosaurus being an ornithomimosaur, he nonetheless recognised the alternative possibility that the similarities could have independently evolved in a Triassic theropod. However, he himself considered convergent evolution unlikely in this case based on his interpretation of the morphological evidence that otherwise appeared distinctly ornithomimosaurian.

Chatterjee supported his argument with an early cladistic analysis of theropods (modelled on the phylogeny of Gauthier, 1986) in which Shuvosaurus possessed almost the entire suite of derived cranial characteristics in ornithomimosaurs in the dataset and as such was recovered in that clade. However, this analysis notably only included theropods and was focused entirely on a set of 43 skull traits that characterised the already recognised theropod taxa. The affinity of Shuvosaurus to Ornithomimosauria was subsequently questioned by later researchers, such as Osmólska (1998). Hunt et al. (1998) and Heckert & Lucas (1998) went even further and argued that although Chatterjee (1993) compared specific features of Shuvosaurus strongly to ornithomimosaurs, he had not demonstrated that the skull was definitively even that of a dinosaur in the first place.

=== As an early theropod ===
Theropod dinosaur affinities for Shuvosaurus were nonetheless still supported by some researchers in the late 1990s and early 2000s, most notably by Oliver Rauhut. In 1997, Rauhut rejected Long and Murry's proposal Shuvosaurus was synonymous with Chatterjeea (and therefore a pseudosuchian) on the basis of theropod-like features of its skull that were unknown in any pseudosuchian at the time (later shown to indeed be convergent by Effigia), but did not identify it as an ornithomimosaur. Instead, he believed Shuvosaurus to be an early-diverging theropod, but could not confidently determine its relationships further due to its numerous derived traits. Rauhut later included Shuvosaurus in a phylogenetic analysis of theropods in 2003, in which it was recovered as a coelophysoid. However, its inclusion led to a polytomy amongst coelophysoids, while their relationships were fully resolved when Shuvosaurus was excluded. A similar relationship was argued for in 2005 in the master's thesis of James Lehane, who specifically identified it as a close relative of "Syntarsus" (now known as Megapnosaurus). Lehane later revised this classification when formally publishing his description of the skull in 2023, subsequent to the discovery of Effigia.

In 2005 Thomas Lehman and Chatterjee briefly alluded to purported additional material that they claimed suggested Shuvosaurus was a theropod more derived than ceratosaurs. However, this report was never followed up on in literature, and when Shuvosaurus was redescribed in 2024 Chatterjee recognised Shuvosaurus as a poposauroid pseudosuchian closely related to Effigia.

=== As a pseudosuchian ===
An affinity to pseudosuchians (or at least poposaurs) was made correctly based on its postcrania from the start, first as juvenile Postosuchus by Chatterjee, and then as Chatterjeea by Long and Murry (1995). Long and Murry regarded the Chatterjeea postcrania as belonging to a highly derived "rauisuchian" derived from poposaurids that they classified under the new family Chatterjeeidae. With the discovery of Effigia in 2006 the association between the Shuvosaurus skull and "Chatterjeea" postcrania was made clear and Shuvosaurus was conclusively reidentified as a "rauisuchian" pseudosuchian related to Poposaurus. This grouping of Poposaurus-like taxa was later defined as the clade Poposauroidea.

Phylogenetic analyses since then consistently find Shuvosaurus as a close relative of Effigia and the South American Sillosuchus, and together make up the re-defined family and clade of Shuvosauridae, deeply nested within Poposauroidea. Up until 2026, Shuvosaurus and Effigia were consistently found to be sister taxa within Shuvosauridae, to the exclusion of Sillosuchus. A fourth shuvosaurid named in 2026 by Elliot Smith and Christian Sidor from Arizona, Sonselasuchus, was also found to be closer to the North American shuvosaurids than Sillosuchus. However, the relationships between the North American shuvosaurids (a subclade Smith and Sidor labelled "Node A") are unresolved, and so it is unclear if Shuvosaurus is closer to Effigia, Sonselasuchus, or neither.

Below is a simplified cladogram modified from Smith and Sidor (2026), with the unresolved relationships of Shuvosaurus to other North American shuvosaurids shown as a polytomy:

- Poposauroidea
  - Qianosuchus mixtus
  - - - Arizonasaurus babbitti
      - Xilousuchus sapingensis
    - - Poposaurus gracilis
      - - Lotosaurus adentus
        - Shuvosauridae
          - Sillosuchus longicervix
          - 'Node A'
            - Effigia okeeffeae
            - Shuvosaurus inexpectatus
            - Sonselasuchus cedrus
