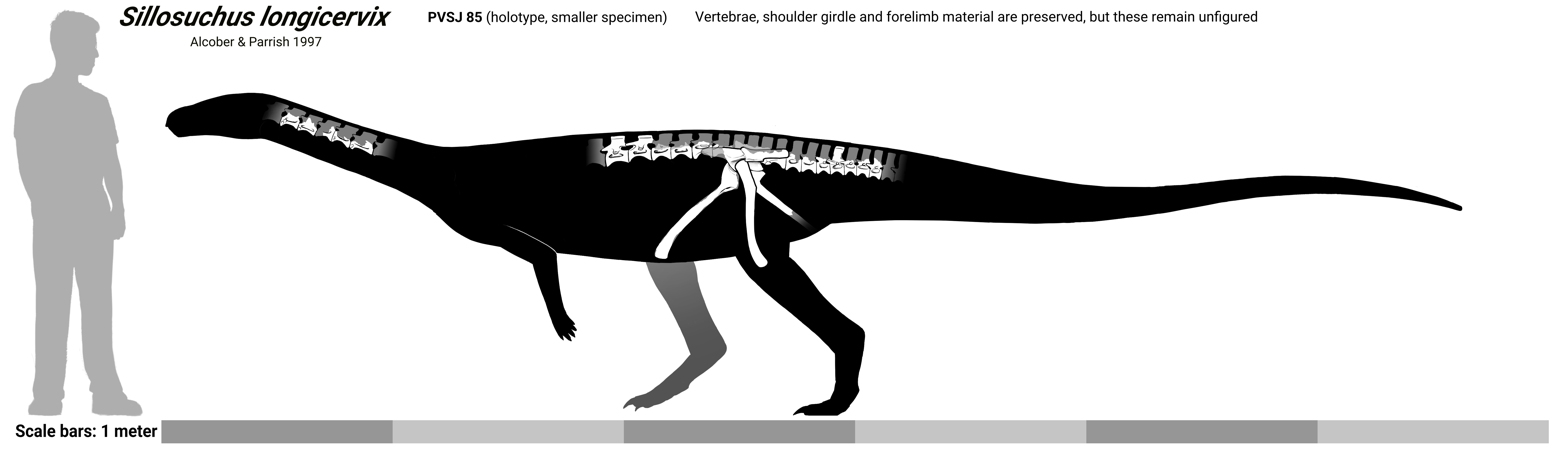
- Skeletal reconstruction and size comparison of the holotype
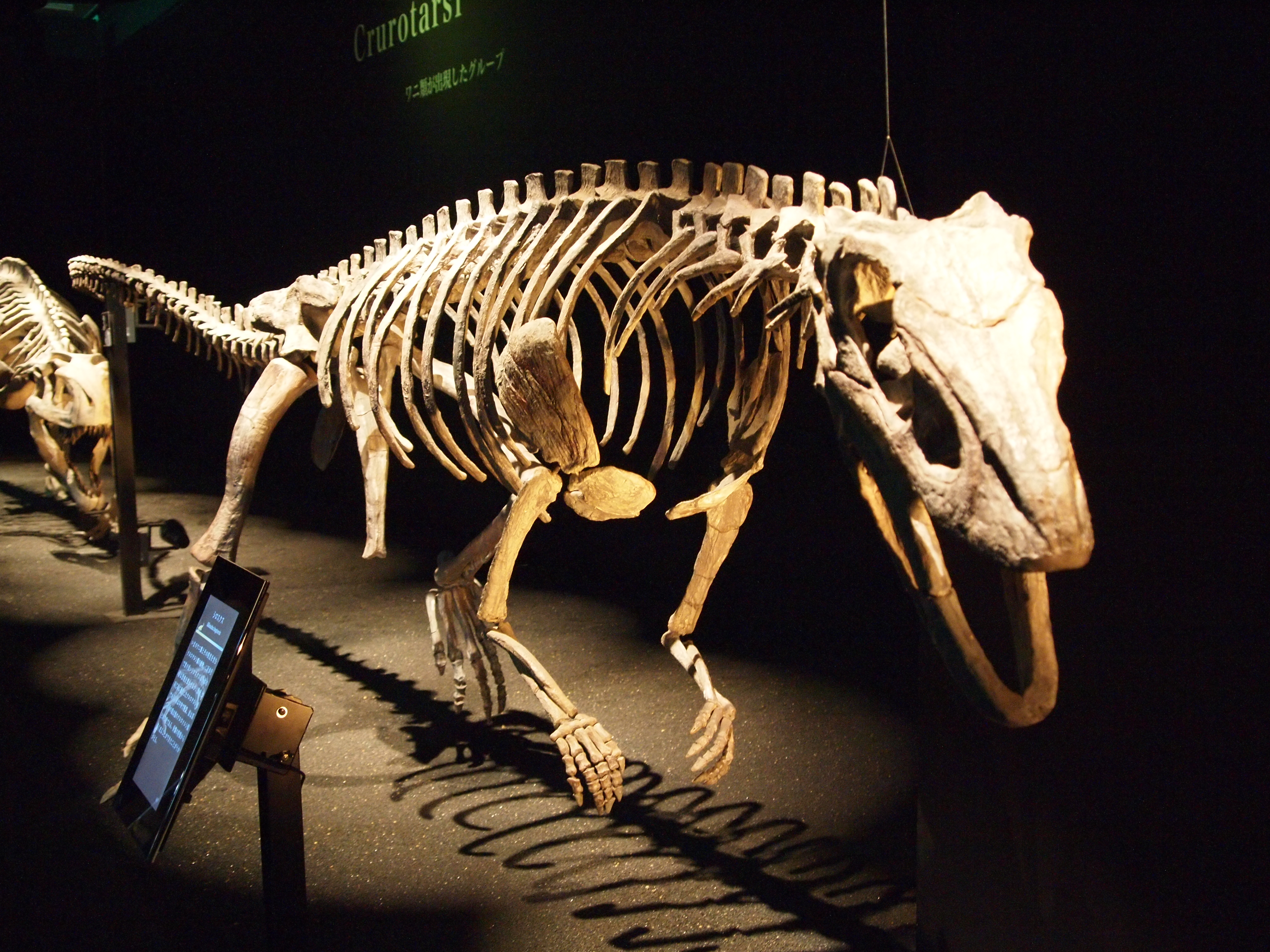
- Mount in Mori Art Museum Gallery, Japan (most of the skeleton is hypothetical)

Scientific classification
- Kingdom: Animalia
- Phylum: Chordata
- Class: Reptilia
- Clade: Archosauria
- Clade: Pseudosuchia
- Clade: Paracrocodylomorpha
- Clade: †Poposauroidea
- Family: †Shuvosauridae
- Genus: †Sillosuchus; Alcober & Parrish 1997

Species
- †S. longicervix Alcober & Parrish 1997 (type)

= Sillosuchus =

Sillosuchus Temporal range: Carnian ~235.0–221.5 Ma

Extinct genus of reptiles

Sillosuchus is a genus of large (femur length = 47 cm (19 in) in the holotype) shuvosaurid poposauroid archosaur that lived in South America during the Late Triassic period. Shuvosaurids were an unusual family of reptiles belonging to the group Poposauroidea; although their closest modern relatives are crocodilians, they were bipedal and lightly armored, with dinosaur-like hip and skull structures. Based on skull remains from members of the family such as Effigia, they were also toothless and likely beaked herbivores.

== Discovery and naming ==
The holotype specimen of Sillosuchus, PVSJ 85, is a partial skeleton discovered in sediments of the Ischigualasto Formation, Cancha de Bochas Member in the Ischigualasto-Villa Unión Basin in northwestern Argentina. The skeleton includes various vertebrae, ribs, and pelvic (hip) bones. A shoulder girdle, humerus (upper arm bone), and partial tibiae (inner shin bones) were also associated with the skeleton but not featured in the original description of the specimen.

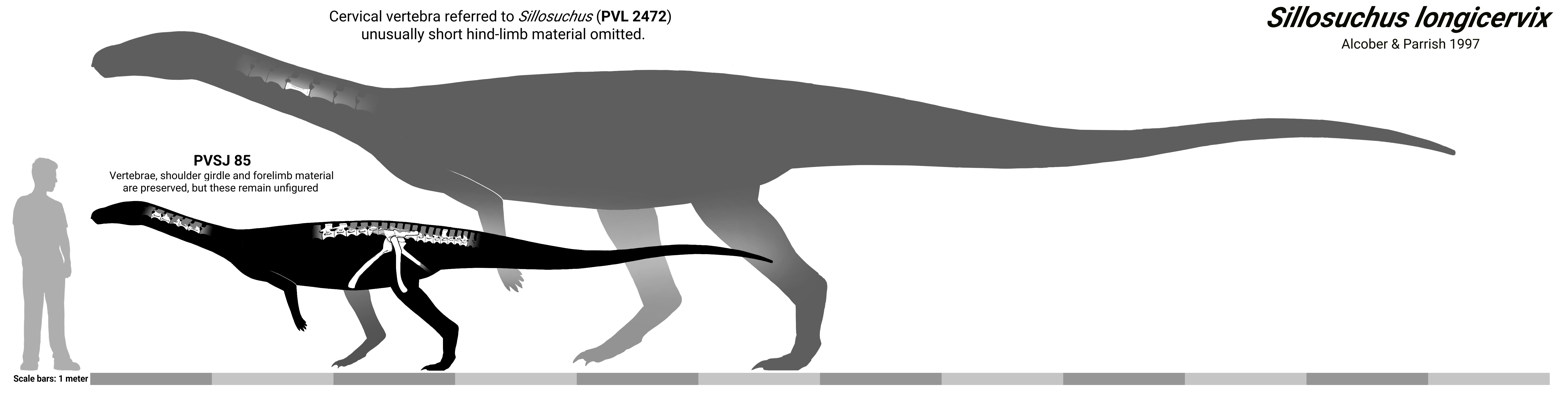
Hypothetical size comparison of a large referred specimen, along the holotype

Possible additional remains were first described by Dr. William Sill in 1974, though he referred them to Saurosuchus, a giant quadrupedal predator distantly related to Sillosuchus. One specimen, PVL 2472, includes fragments of the tibia, ankle, and a large isolated cervical (neck vertebra), 20 cm (7.9 in) long. In comparison, the cervicals of the Sillosuchus holotype are only 8 cm (3.1 in) long. Another specimen, PVL 2267, includes hip and hindlimb material. Nesbitt (2011) briefly reconsidered these large fragments, and found that they showed several distinctive features akin to the Sillosuchus holotype, mostly differing in their much larger size.

The generic name of Sillosuchus refers to Dr. William Sill, and suchus, from the Greek word meaning "crocodile". The specific name, longicervix, refers to the elongated cervical vertebrae of the genus. Later studies have shown that, while the neck of Sillosuchus was long compared to most pseudosuchians, this trait was par for the course for shuvosaurids. A reconstruction of the fossil was presented in 2008 by the National University of San Juan in Argentina, in an homage to Dr. William Dudley Sill who was an important promoter of paleontology in San Juan. Sillosuchus is the only named genus of bipedal poposauroid currently known from outside North America. Other bipedal poposauroids included the related shuvosaurids Shuvosaurus and Effigia, as well as the carnivorous Poposaurus.

== Description ==
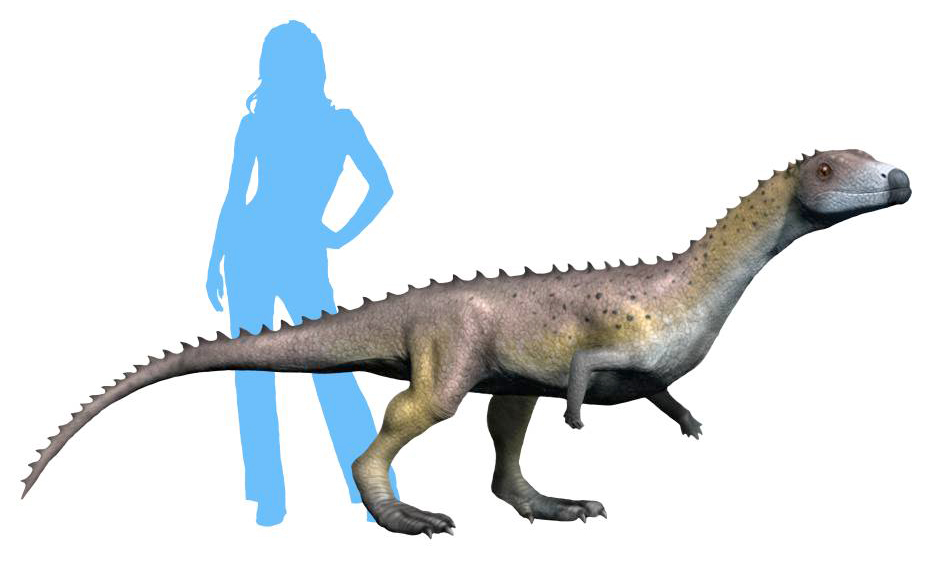
Restoration of Sillosuchus longicervix, size based on the holotype individual

Sillosuchus was among the largest terrestrial pseudosuchians (crocodilian-line archosaurs).

Sillosuchus had several unique features compared to its relatives. The neck and back vertebrae had large excavations or pockets on the side, an unusual trait that assisted paleontologists in assigning the giant cervical vertebra to Sillosuchus rather than Saurosuchus. The left and right ischia (rear-pointing hip bones) were short and fused to each other. They were also flattened in a dorsoventral (top-to-bottom) direction, unlike the case in most other reptiles in which they were flattened in a mediolateral (side-to-side) direction. Otherwise, the hip is practically identical to that of Effigia and Shuvosaurus (also sometimes known as "Chatterjeea").
