= Sterling Nesbitt =

American paleontologist (born 1982)

Sterling Nesbitt (born March 25, 1982, in Mesa, Arizona) is an American paleontologist best known for his work on the origin and early evolutionary patterns of archosaurs. He is currently a professor at Virginia Tech in the Department of Geosciences.

== Biography ==
Sterling Nesbitt received his B.A. in integrative biology with a minor in geology from the University of California Berkeley in 2004. He received his PhD from Columbia University in 2009, completing the majority of his research at the American Museum of Natural History in New York City. He subsequently held postdoctoral researcher positions at the University of Texas at Austin, the University of Washington, and the Field Museum. He is currently a professor in the Department of Geosciences at Virginia Tech in Blacksburg, Virginia. He is also a research associate/affiliate of the American Museum of Natural History, the Vertebrate Paleontology Lab at The University of Texas at Austin, the Virginia Museum of Natural History, the North Carolina Museum of Natural Sciences, and the National Museum of Natural History.

Nesbitt appears in the 2007 IMAX movie Dinosaurs Alive! and the re-worked 2008 version of Walking With Dinosaurs on the Discovery Channel.

== Academic contributions ==
Nesbitt has over 100 publications in peer-reviewed journals with over 7,700 citations (per Google Scholar) and numerous papers in high-profile scientific journals, including Current Biology, Earth-Science Reviews, Nature, Proceedings of the National Academy of Sciences of the United States of America, Proceedings of the Royal Society of London B: Biological Sciences, Royal Society Open Science, Science, and Scientific Reports.

Below is a list of taxa that Nesbitt has contributed to naming:

Year	Taxon	Authors
2026	Lonchidion minimorsus sp. nov.	Keeble, Kligman, Marsh, Stocker, & Nesbitt
2026	Labrujasuchus expectatus gen. et sp. nov.	Turner, Kernan, Laing, Pritchard, Stocker, Irmis, Smith, Werning, & Nesbitt
2026	Ptychotherates bucculentus gen. et sp. nov.	Srivastava & Nesbitt
2025	Fabanychus monos gen. et sp. nov.	Sodano, Kligman, Marsh, Pritchard, Stocker, Parker, Gonçalves, & Nesbitt
2025	Saurichthys justitias sp. nov.	Stack, Nesbitt, Stricklin, & Stocker
2024	Microzemiotes sonselaensis gen. et sp. nov.	Burch, Eddins, Stocker, Kligman, Marsh, Parker, & Nesbitt
2024	Unguinychus onyx gen. et sp. nov.	Pugh, Nesbitt, Heckert, Lauer, & Lauer
2023	Samsarasuchus pamelae gen. et sp. nov.	Ezcurra, Bandyopadhyay, Sengupta, Sen, Sennikov, Sookias, Nesbitt, & Butler
2023	Funcusvermis gilmorei gen. et sp. nov.	Kligman, Gee, Marsh, Nesbitt, Smith, Parker, & Stocker
2023	Venetoraptor gassenae gen. et sp. nov.	Müller, Ezcurra, Garcia, Agnolín, Stocker, Novas, Soares, Kellner, & Nesbitt
2023	Mambachiton fiandohana gen. et sp. nov.	Nesbitt, Patellos, Kammerer, Ranivoharimanana, Wyss, & Flynn
2022	Mbiresaurus raathi gen. et sp. nov.	Griffin, Wynd, Munyikwa, Broderick, Zondo, Tolan, Langer, Nesbitt, & Taruvinga
2022	Mambawakale ruhuhu gen. et sp. nov.	Butler, Fernandez, Nesbitt, Leite, & Gower
2022	Puercosuchus traverorum gen. et sp. nov.	Marsh, Parker, Nesbitt, Kligman, & Stocker
2021	Kranosaura kuttyi gen. et sp. nov.	Nesbitt, Stocker, Chatterjee, Horner, & Goodwin
2021	Syntomiprosopus sucherorum gen. et sp. nov.	Heckert, Nesbitt, Stocker, Schneider, Hoffman, & Zimmer
2020	Rugarhynchos sixmilensis gen. et comb. nov.	Wynd, Nesbitt, Stocker, & Heckert
2020	Trilophosaurus phasmalophos sp. nov.	Kligman, Marsh, Nesbitt, Parker, & Stocker
2020	Kongonaphon kely gen. et sp. nov.	Kammerer, Nesbitt, Flynn, Ranivoharimanana, & Wyss
2020	Dynamosuchus collisensis gen. et sp. nov.	Müller, Von Bacsko, Desoko, & Nesbitt
2019	Suskityrannus hazelae gen. et sp. nov.	Nesbitt, Denton, Loewen, Brusatte, Smith, Turner, Kirkland, McDonald, & Wolfe
2018	Mandasuchus tanyauchen gen. et sp. nov.	Butler, Nesbitt, Charig, Gower, & Barrett
2017	Avicranium renestoi gen. et sp. nov.	Pritchard & Nesbitt
2017	Teleocrater rhadinus gen. et sp. nov.	Nesbitt et al.
2016	Litorosuchus somnii gen. et sp. nov.	Li, Wu, Zhao, Nesbitt, Stocker, & Wang
2016	Triopticus primus gen. et sp. nov.	Stocker, Nesbitt, Criswell, Parker, Witmer, Rowe, Ridgely, & Brown
2016	Vivaron haydeni gen. et sp. nov.	Lessner, Stocker, Smith, Turner, Irmis, & Nesbitt
2016	Calciavis grandei gen. et sp. nov.	Nesbitt & Clarke
2015	Lepidus praecisio gen. et sp. nov.	Nesbitt & Ezcurra
2015	Carnufex carolinensis gen. et sp. nov.	Zanno, Drymala, Nesbitt, & Schneider
2014	Nundasuchus songeaensis gen. et sp. nov.	Nesbitt, Sidor, Angielczyk, Smith, & Tsuji
2013	Lutungutali sitwensis gen. et sp. nov.	Peecook, Sidor, Nesbitt, Smith, Steyer, & Angielczyk
2013	Asperoris mnyama gen. et sp. nov.	Nesbitt, Butler, & Gower
2012	Nyasasaurus parringtoni gen. et sp. nov.	Nesbitt, Barrett, Werning, Sidor, & Charig
2011	Diodorus scytobrachion gen. et sp. nov.	Kammerer, Nesbitt, & Shubin
2011	Albinykus baatar gen. et sp. nov.	Nesbitt, Clarke, Turner, & Norell
2011	Daemonosaurus chauliodus gen. et sp. nov.	Sues, Nesbitt, Berman, & Henrici
2010	Azendohsaurus madagaskarensis sp. nov.	Flynn, Nesbitt, Parrish, Ranivoharimanana, & Wyss
2010	Asilisaurus kongwe gen. et sp. nov.	Nesbitt, Sidor, Irmis, Angielczyk, Smith, & Tsuji
2009	Limusaurus inextricabilis gen. et sp. nov.	Xu et al.
2009	Kol ghuva gen. et sp. nov.	Turner, Nesbitt, & Norell
2009	Tawa hallae gen. et sp. nov.	Nesbitt, Smith, Irmis, Turner, Downs, & Norell
2009	Dromomeron gregorii sp. nov.	Nesbitt, Irmis, Parker, Smith, Turner, & Rowe
2007	Dromomeron romeri gen. et sp. nov.	Irmis, Nesbitt, Padian, Smith, Turner, Woody, & Downs
2007	Effigia okeeffeae gen. et sp. nov.	Nesbitt & Norell
2005	Redondavenator quayensis gen. et sp. nov.	Nesbitt, Irmis, Lucas, & Hunt
2004	Ammorhynchus navajoi gen. et sp. nov.	Nesbitt & Whatley
