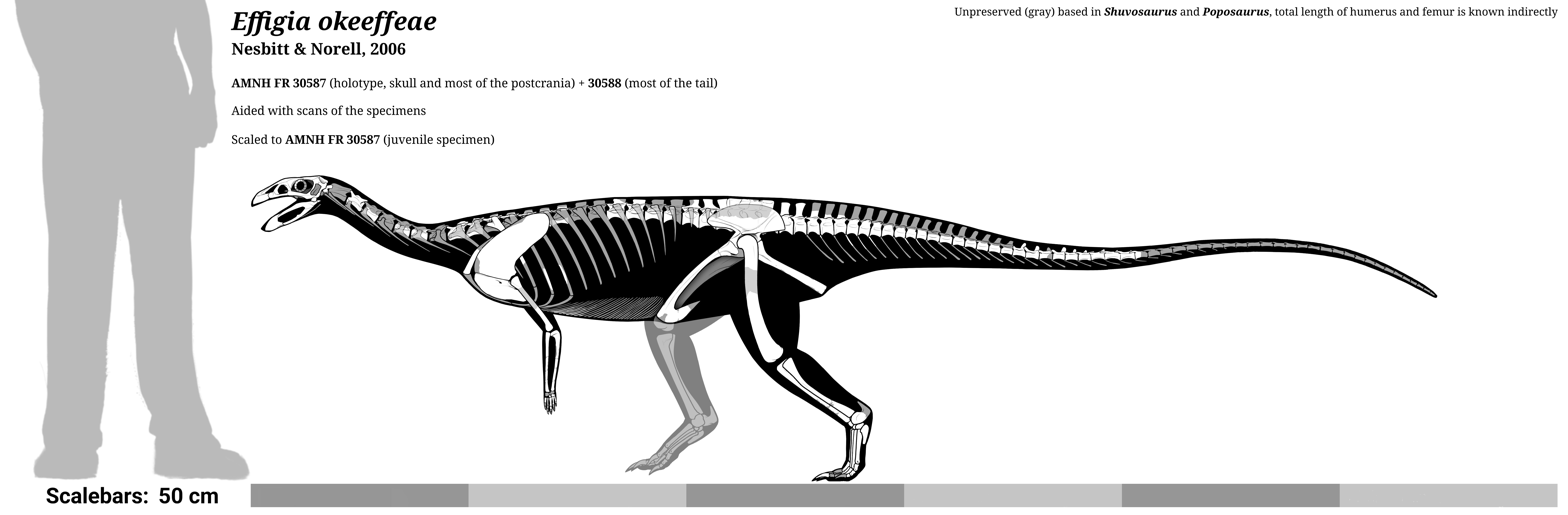
- Skeletal reconstruction
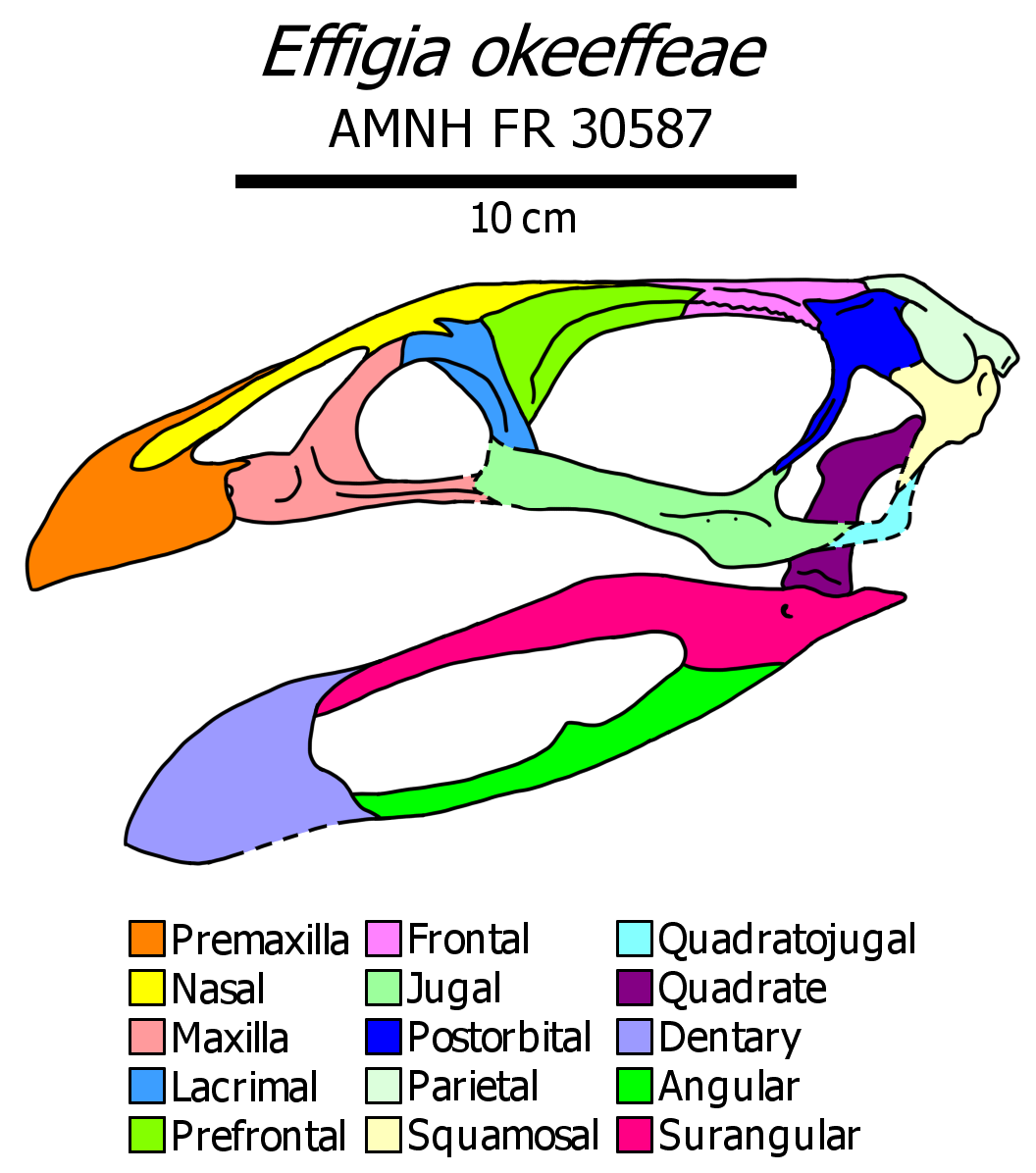
- Skull diagram

Scientific classification
- Kingdom: Animalia
- Phylum: Chordata
- Class: Reptilia
- Clade: Pseudosuchia
- Clade: Suchia
- Clade: Paracrocodylomorpha
- Clade: †Poposauroidea
- Family: †Shuvosauridae
- Genus: †Effigia; Nesbitt and Norell, 2006

Species
- †E. okeeffeae Nesbitt and Norell, 2006 (type)

= Effigia =

Effigia Temporal range: Rhaetian Late Triassic

Extinct genus of Archosaurs

Effigia is an extinct genus of shuvosaurid known from the Late Triassic of New Mexico, south-western USA. With a bipedal stance, long neck, and a toothless beaked skull, Effigia and other shuvosaurids bore a resemblance to the ornithomimid dinosaurs of the Cretaceous Period. However, shuvosaurids were not dinosaurs, but were instead a specialized family of poposauroid pseudosuchians, meaning that their closest living relatives are crocodilians.

== Discovery ==
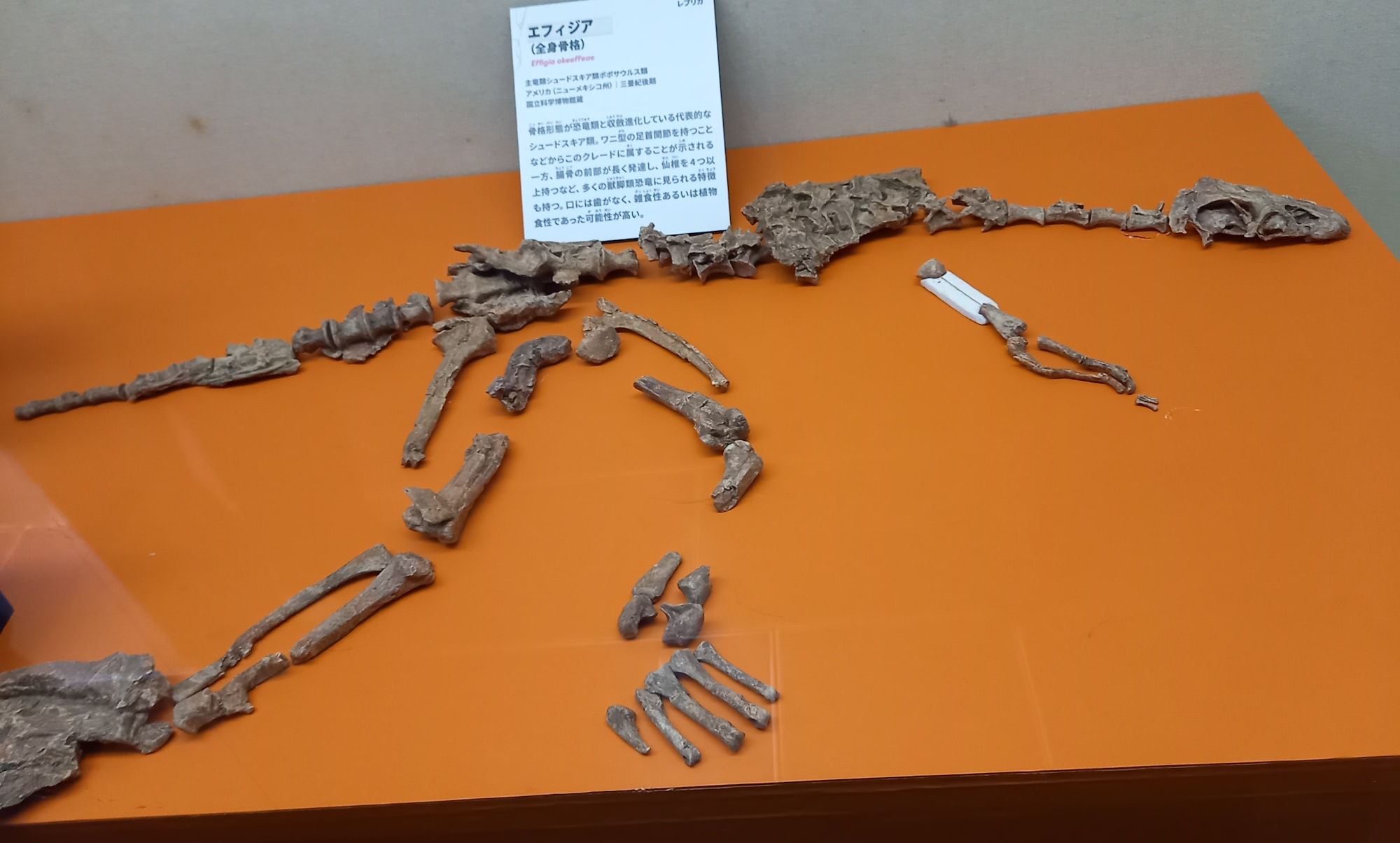
Replica of fossil specimen displayed at the Nagoya City Science Museum

The holotype fossil was collected by Edwin H. Colbert in 1947. At this time Colbert led an excavation to collect blocks of rock from the Whitaker Quarry of Ghost Ranch, near Abiquiu, New Mexico. Colbert's expedition intended to recover abundant fossils of the basal theropod dinosaur Coelophysis, and he believed that no other large vertebrates were present in the quarry. As a result, his crew did not even open the plaster jackets of most of the blocks that were shipped to the American Museum of Natural History. The plaster jacket containing the holotype of Effigia started to be prepared in 2004, and the specimen was uncovered by graduate student Sterling Nesbitt at the AMNH. Nesbitt was opening jackets of blocks in order to find new specimens of Coelophysis. Upon finding the remains of Effigia, he instantly recognized this was not a dinosaur and proceeded to track down the rest of the blocks from that area of the quarry. Nesbitt and Mark Norell, curator at the museum, named it Effigia okeeffeae in January 2006 after Georgia O'Keeffe, who spent many years at Ghost Ranch.

== Convergence ==
Effigia is noted for its remarkable similarity to ornithomimid dinosaurs. In 2007, Nesbitt's description demonstrated that Effigia was very similar to Shuvosaurus, and is definitely a member of the archosaur subgroup Pseudosuchia (the line leading towards modern crocodilians). Its similarity to ornithomimids represents a case of "extreme" convergent evolution. Nesbitt also demonstrated that Shuvosaurus was the same animal as Chatterjeea, and that it belonged to an exclusive clade containing closely related suchians such as Shuvosaurus and Poposaurus (Poposauroidea). Within this group, Effigia forms an even more exclusive clade with Shuvosaurus and the South American Sillosuchus (Shuvosauridae). In 2007, Lucas and others suggested that "Effigia" was synonymous with "Shuvosaurus" and used the new combination "Shuvosaurus okeeffeae" for the animal. This proposal has not been accepted by Nesbitt.

== Paleobiology ==
Examination of Effigia's jaws suggest it was a specialist herbivore that filled a niche as a browser feeding on softer plant material, due to its weak jaws and sharp beak. It was previously suggested that it pecked for food like ostriches or other ratites, but biomechanical studies have estimated that its skull could not withstand such forces.
