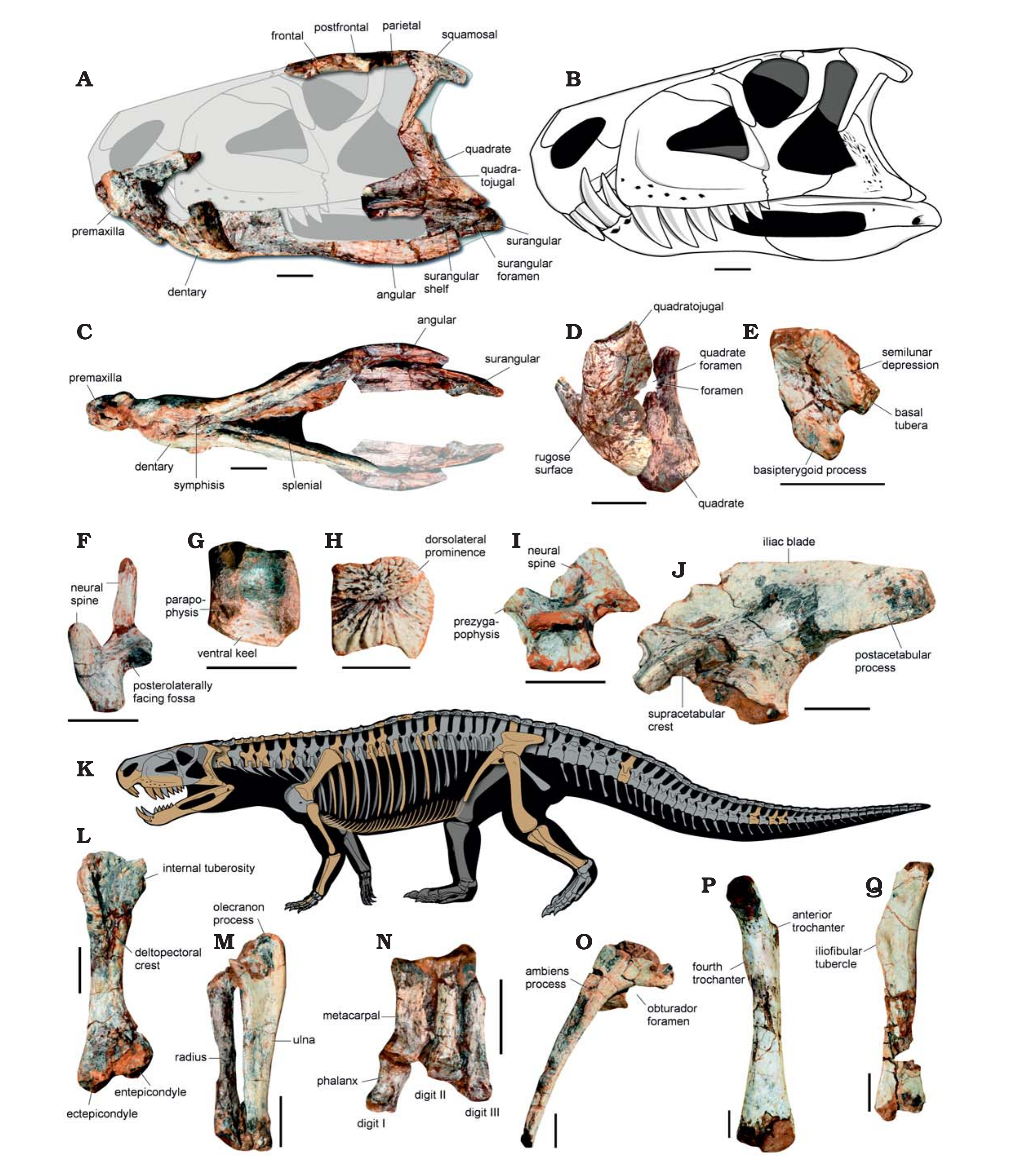
- Fossil material and skeletal reconstruction

Scientific classification
- Kingdom: Animalia
- Phylum: Chordata
- Class: Reptilia
- Clade: Archosauria
- Clade: Pseudosuchia
- Family: †Ornithosuchidae
- Genus: †Dynamosuchus; Müller et al., 2020

Species
- †D. collisensis Müller et al., 2020 (type)

= Dynamosuchus =

Dynamosuchus Temporal range: Carnian

Extinct genus of reptiles

Dynamosuchus is an extinct genus of pseudosuchian archosaurs from the family Ornithosuchidae. It is known from a single species, Dynamosuchus collisensis, which is based on a partial skeleton from the Santa Maria Formation of Brazil. Dynamosuchus is considered a close relative of Venaticosuchus, which is known from the Ischigualasto Formation of Argentina. Ornithosuchids are one of many groups which lived in the Santa Maria and Ischigualasto Formations, which formed at approximately the same time (the Carnian stage of the Late Triassic) and were ecologically similar. As a large scavenging reptile, Dynamosuchus helps to illuminate the trophic structure of the Santa Maria Formation. It also supports the hypothesis that ornithosuchids had diversified throughout South America by the start of the Carnian, and were not originally endemic to the Ischigualasto-Villa Unión Basin.

== Discovery ==
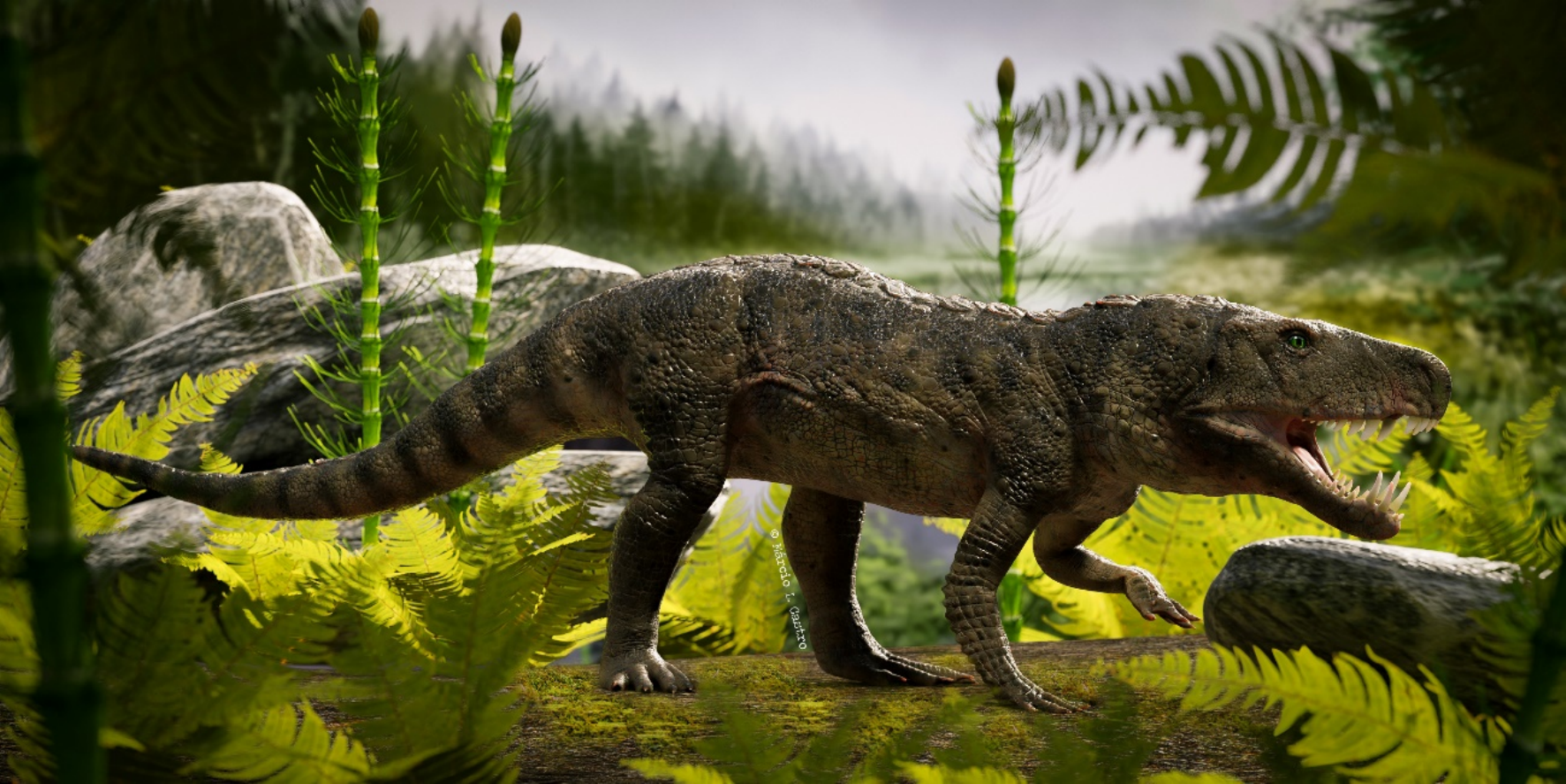
Life reconstruction by Márcio L. Castro

Dynamosuchus is known from a single partial skeleton, CAPPA/UFSM 0248, stored at the Centro de Apoio à Pesquisa Paleontológica da Quarta Colônia (CAPPA) of the Federal University of Santa Maria (UFSM). This specimen consists of parts of the skull, several cervical and dorsal vertebrae, and a large portion of the limbs. It was discovered at the Janner site near the town of Agudo in Rio Grande do Sul, Brazil. The Janner site preserves late Triassic sediments of the Santa Maria Formation. Based on the abundance of Exaerotodon (a large herbivorous cynodont) and Hyperodapedon (a rhynchosaur), it was probably equivalent in age and environment to the Carnian-age Ischigualasto Formation of Argentina. Other animals known from the Janner site include basal sauropodomorphs (Pampadromaeus and Bagualosaurus) and large carnivorous cynodonts (Trucidocynodon).

The generic name Dynamosuchus is Greek for "powerful crocodile", in reference to its pseudosuchian heritage and strong bite force, as proposed for other ornithosuchids. The specific name collisensis is based on collis, the Latin term for hill, which references the fact that the Janner site is located at the base of a hill. The holotype skeleton was discovered in March 2019 and described in 2020 by Rodrigo T. Müller (CAPPA/UFSM), M. Belén Von Baczko (Museo de la Plata), Julia B. Desojo (Museo de la Plata), and Sterling J. Nesbitt (Virginia Tech).

== Description ==
=== Skull ===
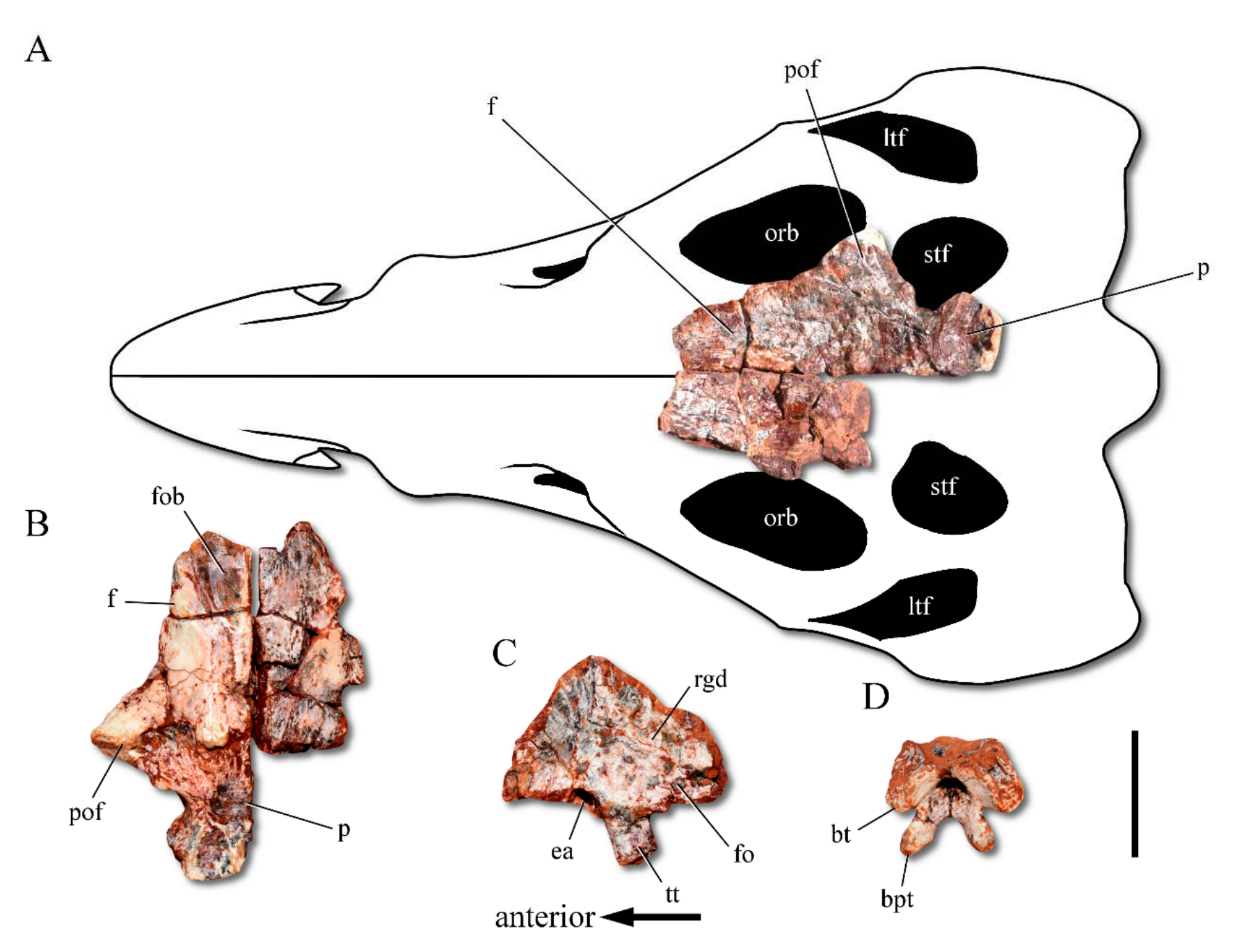
Skull material

Like other ornithosuchids, the snout of Dynamosuchus had a hooked premaxilla with three teeth, followed by a gap (a diastema) and a deep maxilla with six to eight teeth. The maxilla was similar to that of Ornithosuchus due to possessing pitting on its outer surface (absent in Venaticosuchus and Riojasuchus) and a not particularly deep antorbital fossa (unlike Riojasuchus). Preserved skull bones generally reconstruct a skull with small orbits and temporal fenestration like Riojasuchus, but the squamosal is not as thick as in that taxon. The quadratojugal bone was roughly textured and L-shaped, not as acute in angle as Riojasuchus. A hole known as a quadrate foramen separates the quadratojugal from the quadrate, and an additional smaller hole on the quadrate opens up into the quadrate foramen. The additional hole is an autapomorphy (unique characteristic) of Dynamosuchus absent in other ornithosuchids.

The parabasisphenoid bone at the bottom of the braincase has a semilunar depression like that of Venaticosuchus, but the gap between its basipterygoid processes and basitubera is less acute than in that taxon. Dynamosuchus's basipterygoid processes are also more closely spaced and pointed further rearwards compared to Venaticosuchus. The surangular is similar to that of Riojasuchus, with a pronounced blade-like crest on its outer surface and a large hole (a surangular foramen) at the rear of the jaw. The jaw as a whole deepens towards the chin and has a long mandibular fenestra.

=== Postcrania ===
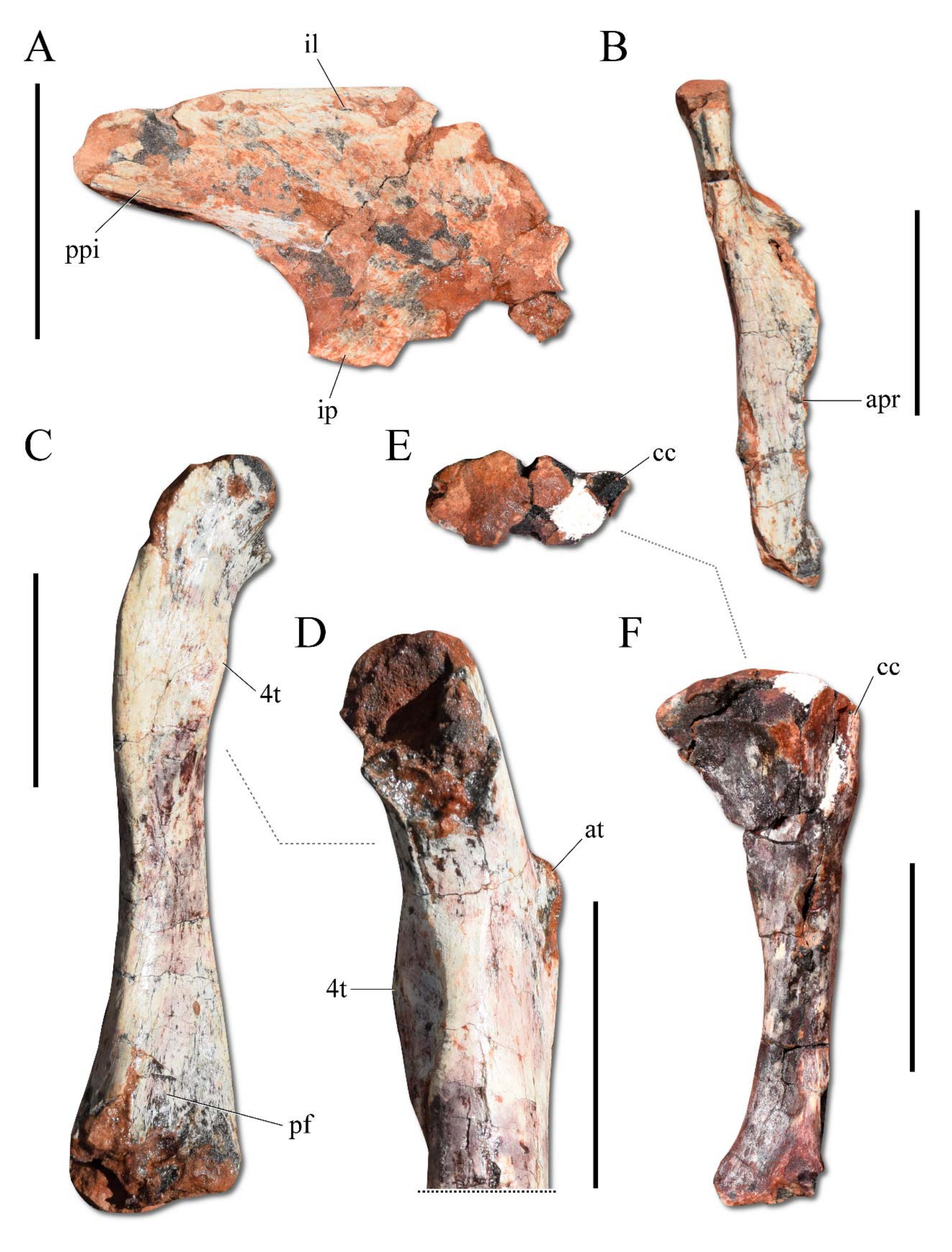
Postcranial material

The cervical (neck) vertebrae have a variety of features shared with various pseudosuchians, such as pits below the postzygapophyses (rear connecting plates), expanded neural spines, and a strong keel on the underside. Dorsal vertebrae near the shoulder have a pair of centrodiapophyseal laminae, buttress-like crests connecting the diapophyses (rib facets) to the centrum (spool-shaped lower portion of each vertebra). These crests are shared with Ornithosuchus but absent in Riojasuchus and unknown in Venaticosuchus. In most other respects, the dorsal vertebrae of Dynamosuchus are more similar to Riojasuchus than Ornithosuchus. For example, Dynamosuchus lacks prezygodiapophyseal and postzygodiapophyseal laminae. These crests, present in Ornithosuchus, connect the diapophyses to the zygapophyses (vertebral connecting plates).

Dynamosuchus's osteoderms are set in two rows along the back, are somewhat square-shaped, and are densely textured by radiating ridges and grooves. Osteoderms at the front of the body often have a sideways-oriented peak-like projection. The forelimb bones are thick and generally strongly built. The radius expands towards the wrist more so than Ornithosuchus, while the humeral head is not as developed as that of Riojasuchus. The hip has an overall shape like that of Ornithosuchus, with a smooth and straight upper portion of the ilium, a long pubis, and three sacral vertebrae. Like other ornithosuchids, the hindlimb bones are large and have prominent and/or unusual muscle scars. These include an anterior trochanter at the top of the femur, and a knob-like scar for the iliofibularis muscle on the shaft of the fibula. The iliofibularis attachment is located about 1/3rd down the shaft of the fibula in Dynamosuchus, while it is about halfway down in Riojasuchus.

== Classification ==
The relations of Dynamosuchus were investigated using a phylogenetic analysis adapted from Ezcurra et al. (2017). The analysis found Dynamosuchus as a sister taxon to Venaticosuchus based on a semilunar depression on the parabasisphenoid and an L-shaped quadratojugal. The Dynamosuchus + Venaticosuchus clade is itself sister to Riojasuchus based on a strongly downturned premaxilla and expanded outer radius. Ornithosuchus is found to be the most basal ornithosuchid, and ornithosuchids are related to erpetosuchids and aetosaurs, replicating the results of Ezcurra et al. (2017).

The following cladogram is based on the results of the phylogenetic analysis:

- Pseudosuchia
  - Phytosauria
  - - Nundasuchus
    - - - Gracilisuchidae
        - Other suchians
      - - Aetosauria
        - - Erpetosuchidae
          - Ornithosuchidae
            - Ornithosuchus
            - - Riojasuchus
              - - Venaticosuchus
                - Dynamosuchus

== Palaeobiology ==
=== Life history ===
Osteohistological evidence reveals that D. collisensis developed ontogenetically at a rapid, sustained pace, unlike the later crocodylomorphs but like poposauroids and early loricatans.
