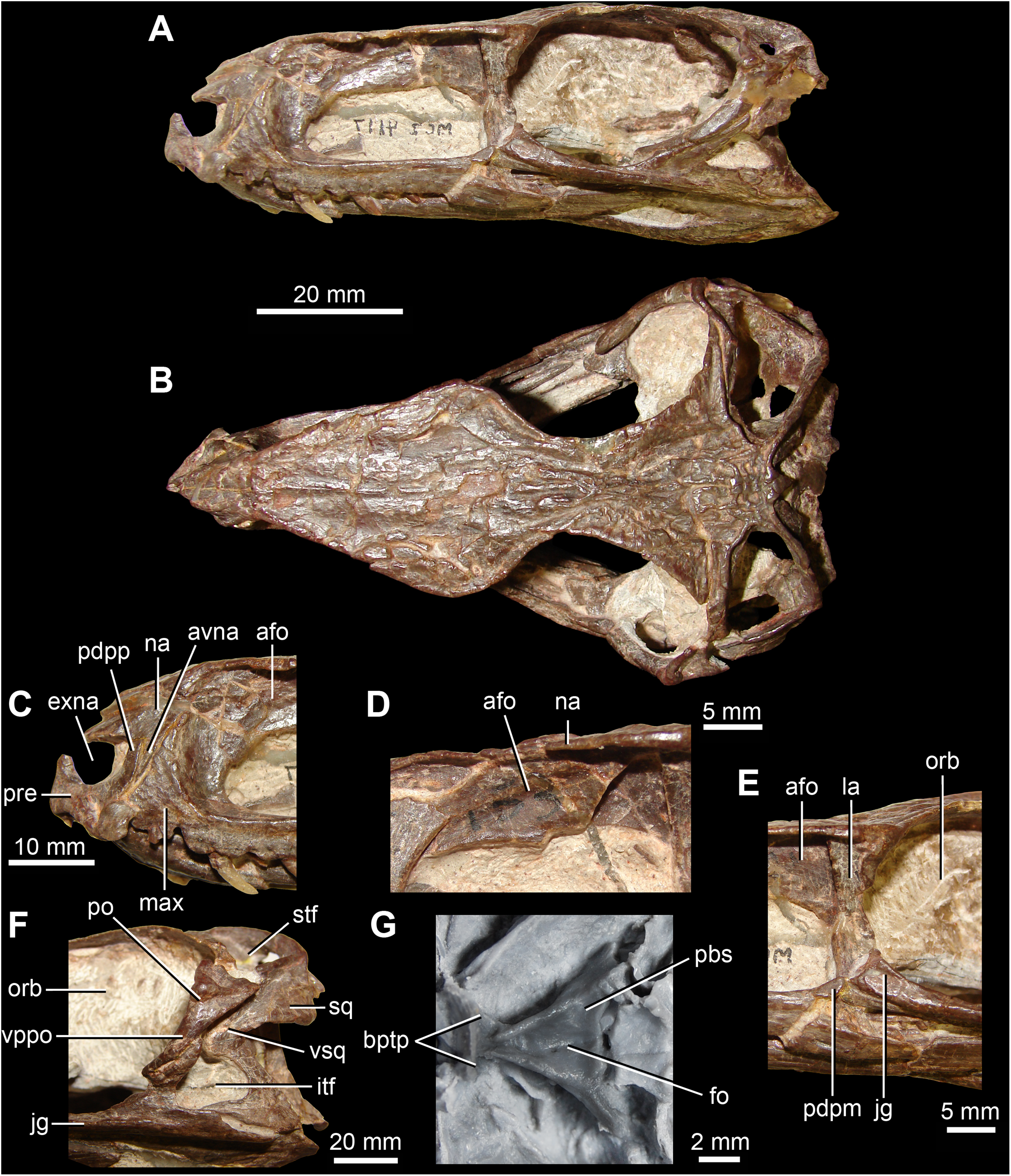
- Multiple views of skulls of Gracilisuchus stipanicicorum
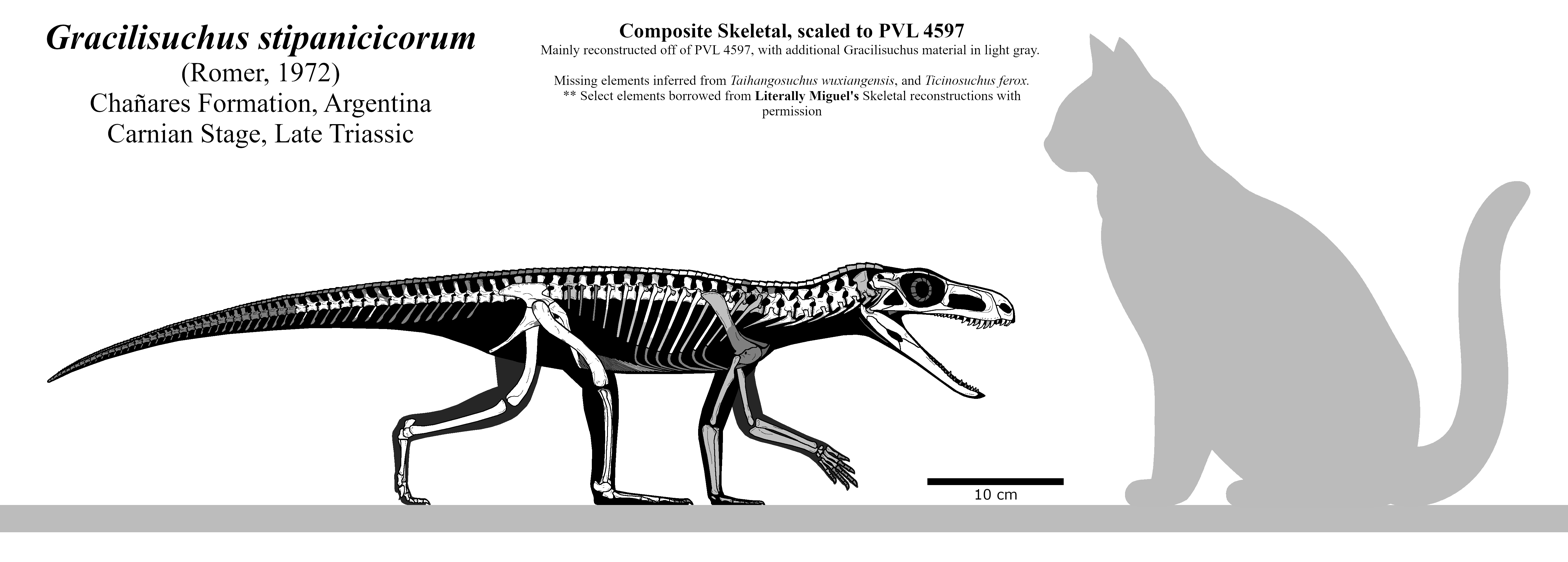
- Skeletal reconstruction

Scientific classification
- Kingdom: Animalia
- Phylum: Chordata
- Class: Reptilia
- Clade: Pseudosuchia
- Family: †Gracilisuchidae
- Genus: †Gracilisuchus; Romer, 1972
- Species: †G. stipanicicorum

Binomial name
- †Gracilisuchus stipanicicorum Romer, 1972

= Gracilisuchus =

Gracilisuchus Temporal range: Carnian, 236–234 Ma

Genus of fossil reptiles

Gracilisuchus (meaning "slender crocodile") (Note: Or slender, long (one); L. gracilis = slender; Gk. sυchnós (via irregular derivation) = long) is an extinct genus of tiny pseudosuchian (a group which includes the ancestors of crocodilians) from the Late Triassic of Argentina. It contains a single species, G. stipanicicorum, which is placed in the clade Suchia, close to the ancestry of crocodylomorphs. Both the genus and the species were first described by Alfred Romer in 1972.

== Discovery ==
=== Discovery of the holotype ===
A four-month expedition spanning 1964 and 1965 in the Ischigualasto-Villa Unión Basin of La Rioja Province, Argentina was conducted by Alfred Romer and his colleagues, who consisted of researchers from the Museum of Comparative Zoology (MCZ) at Harvard University. While the first two months of the expedition were unfruitful, excavations near the Chañares River and the Gualo River, soon uncovered specimens belonging to a wide variety of tetrapod groups. Among these was the skeleton of a small suchian archosaur, discovered about 3 kilometres (1.9 mi) north of the Chañares River. The skeleton was stored at the La Plata Museum (MLP), which had supported the expedition, under the specimen number MLP 64-XI-14-11. The specimen has since been transferred to the Museum of Paleontology at the National University of La Rioja (PULR), where it bears the specimen number PULR 08.

This specimen, which would become the holotype of Gracilisuchus, consists of a partial skull, an incomplete vertebral column, parts of the scapula and humerus, gastralia, and several associated osteoderms. Several other specimens are mixed in with these remains on the same slab. A vertebral series ("Series A"), originally identified as the tail of Gracilisuchus, has been reassigned to Tropidosuchus. Another series of cervical vertebrae ("Series B") underwent a similar reassignment. A scapula and coracoid overlapping the holotype's limb bones likely belongs to a second Gracilisuchus. There are three ilia, none of which belong to the holotype; one belongs to a specimen of Lagosuchus, another to Tropidosuchus. A right hindlimb and a left femur and tibia have been assigned to Tropidosuchus, and another one has been assigned to Lagosuchus. The right hindlimb's foot was originally assigned to Gracilisuchus.

=== Additional specimens and description ===
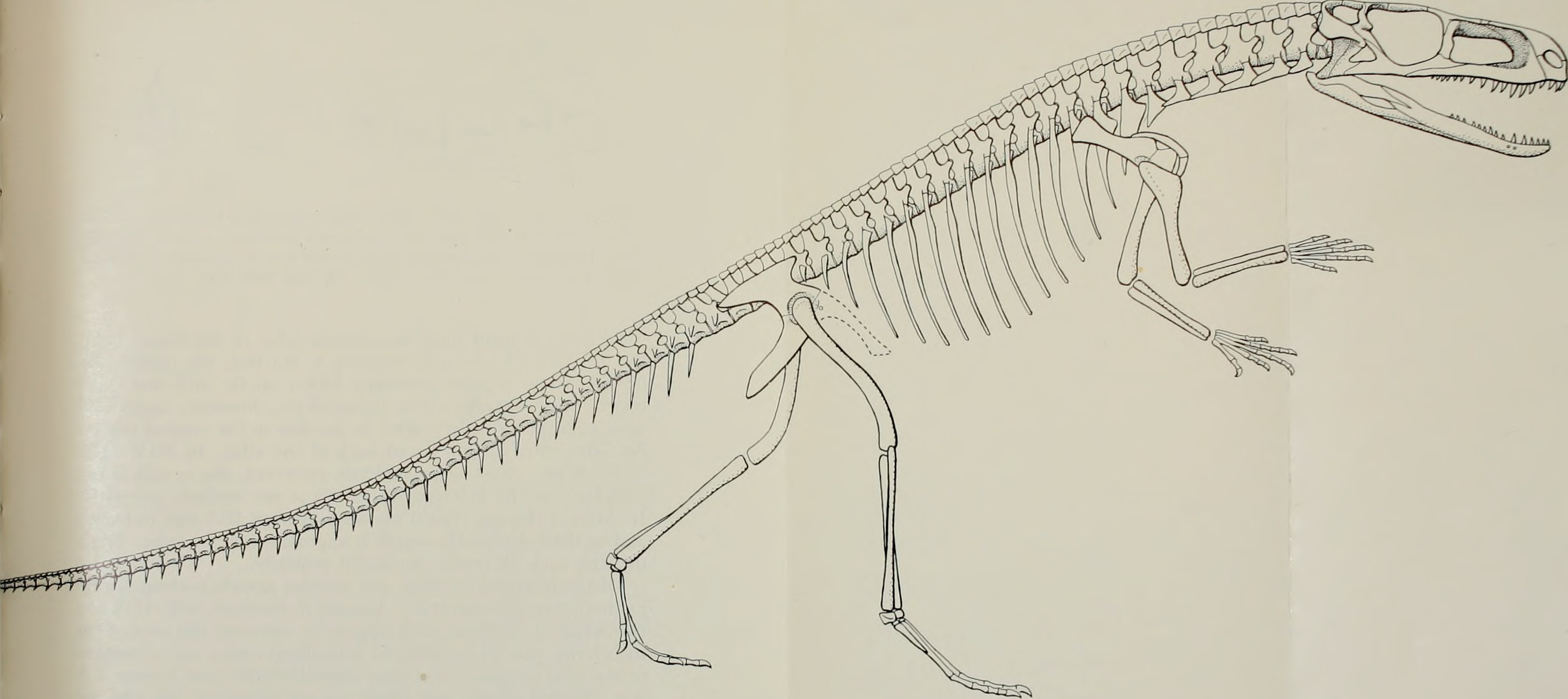
Gracilisuchus as restored by Romer in 1972

Three other specimens, stored at the MCZ, were found by Romer and his team in the same locality as the holotype. They are MCZ 1147, a nearly complete skull with jaws; MCZ 4118, parts of the skull, a well-preserved neck, and other elements; and MCZ 4116, a crushed skull and jaw with material from the rest of the body, some of it pertaining to a smaller specimen. José Bonaparte from the Miguel Lillo Institute (PVL) later collected additional material from the site between 1970 and 1972, including two new specimens: PVL 4597, the "Tucuman specimen", which includes a nearly complete skull and jaws, nearly complete cervical and dorsal vertebrae, partial sacral and caudal vertebrae, the hip girdle, most of the left hindlimb, and part of the hindlimb, which is 20% larger than the holotype; and PVL 4612, a nearly complete skull and jaws.

In 1972, Romer described the specimens his team had discovered in the journal Breviora. He named a new genus for the specimens, Gracilisuchus, with the prefix Gracili- referring to "the obviously graceful build of the little reptile". Furthermore, he placed them in the type and only species G. stipanicicorum, which honors the work of Pedro and Maria Stipanicic in the stratigraphy and paleobotany of the Triassic period. In this paper, Romer also provided a skeletal reconstruction of Gracilisuchus, due to his impression that nearly the entire skeleton was available. However, several elements had been erroneously referred by him. The lack of complete knowledge regarding its anatomy hampered subsequent studies of Gracilisuchus, until papers from Lecuona, Desojo, and Diego Pol in 2011 and 2017 redescribed its remains. The first of these focused on PVL 4597, while the second reviewed all of the known specimens.

== Description ==
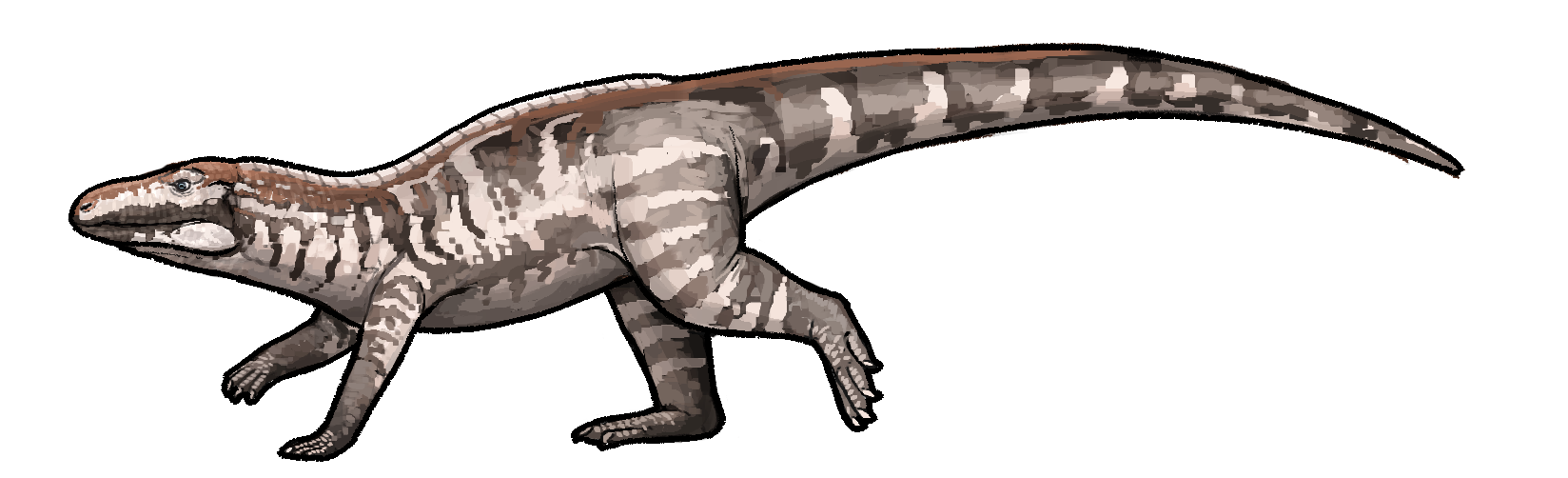
Life restoration of G. stipanicicorum

Gracilisuchus was a small member of the Pseudosuchia. The largest skull has a length of slightly over 9 centimetres (3.5 in), and the largest femur has a length of roughly 8 centimetres (3.1 in). In 1972, Alfred Romer estimated a total length of 21 centimetres (8.3 in); in 2014, Agustinia Lecuona and Julia Desojo estimated a length of 28 centimetres (11 in) for the body excluding the hip and tail. The weight of Gracilisuchus has been estimated at 1.31 kilograms (2.9 lb).

=== Skull ===
A number of characteristics of the skull can be used to distinguish Gracilisuchus. Its skull openings are relatively large, with the antorbital fenestra occupying 30-36% of the skull roof's length and the eye socket occupying 35-42% of the skull roof's length. Additionally, the supratemporal fenestra is, uniquely, wider than it is long. Within the eye socket, there is a scleral ring, and the ossicles (bony segments) comprising the ring contact but do not overlap each other. Unlike its closest relatives, Turfanosuchus and Yonghesuchus, but convergent upon Tropidosuchus, early theropods, and the Crocodylomorpha, the lacrimal bone is as tall as the eye socket instead of being significantly shorter.

Behind the eye socket, the vertical process of the jugal bone is uniquely straight. The backward process of the jugal is located underneath the forward process of the quadratojugal bone, convergent upon Erpetosuchus, Postosuchus, Polonosuchus, and the Crocodylomorpha, unlike Turfanosuchus and Yonghesuchus where they are the other way around. Furthermore, a postfrontal bone is present, with an outer process that is uniquely long and extends over the back of the eye socket. There is also a postparietal bone, which is small and triangular. At the back of the skull, the posttemporal foramen is large relative to the skull's width. Also unlike Turfanosuchus and Yonghesuchus, Gracilisuchus has four teeth in the premaxilla instead of five, like Prestosuchus, Saurosuchus, Fasolasuchus, Batrachotomus, the Rauisuchidae, and the Crocodylomorpha. There is no cutting edge, or carina, at the front of the premaxillary teeth, and they lack serrated denticles on either the front or rear edges.

=== Vertebrae ===
There are eight cervical vertebrae. Unlike Turfanosuchus, Euparkeria, Fasolasuchus, Saurosuchus, and sphenosuchians, the suture between the centrum and neural arch of the axis (second cervical) bears an unrounded, triangular upward projection. There is a long, narrow longitudinal keel on the bottom of the axis, which is also seen in Riojasuchus, Saurosuchus, the aetosaur Stagonolepis, and phytosaurs. The front border of the neural spine is uniquely high and vertical, while the rear border is concave like Turfanosuchus but unlike Erpetosuchus. Similar to both, the articular process known as the postzygapophysis projects over the back of the centrum, but it is uniquely in the horizontal plane. The remaining cervicals have poorly-developed keels on their bottom surfaces, in contrast to Erpetosuchus, Nundasuchus, aetosaurs, Saurosuchus, and Riojasuchus. The sides of their centra have long depressions, like Turfanosuchus, aetosaurs, Batrachotomus, and Ticinosuchus.

In at least the fourth, sixth, and seventh cervicals, there are narrow, rounded "tables" at the base of the neural spines, like Turfanosuchus and Euparkeria. There are circular depressions at the front of the neural spines, above the neural arches, a trait shared with Turfanosuchus. The postzygapophyses are located at the same level as another set of processes, the prezygapophyses, like Turfanosuchus, Erpetosuchus, and Ornithosuchus. The top margin of the postzygapophyses are convex like Turfanosuchus. There are depressions below the postzygapophyses, which are not seen in any other archosaurs except for Stagonosuchus and Batrachotomus, where they are deeper. Another set of processes known as the parapophyses extend backwards onto longitudinal ridges, like Nundasuchus, Batrachotomus, and Postosuchus.

There are sixteen dorsal vertebrae. Like Parringtonia, Nundasuchus, and other archosaurs, the articulating surfaces of their centra are flat. The keels on their bottom surfaces are again very weak, which is unlike Riojasuchus, Erpetosuchus, Parringtonia, and Nundasuchus, but like aetosaurs. There are no "tables" on the neural spines either, unlike Turfanosuchus, Erpetosuchus, Parringtonia, aetosaurs, Nundasuchus, and Ticinosuchus. Like Turfanosuchus, Parringtonia, and Nundasuchus, the prezygapophyses are located at the same level as the top of the front of some of the centra. Some of the sideways-projecting transverse processes have somewhat deep cavities underneath, like Turfanosuchus, but they are more poorly developed than Nundasuchus, Batrachotomus, or Stagonosuchus.

Two sacral vertebrae are known. The transverse processes of the first sacral, which are nearly fused to the ribs, are separated from the neural spines by two pairs of grooves which form an acute angle. The second sacral's neural arch also bears a long depression on its top surface. The appearance of these characteristics are more similar to Turfanosuchus than Nundasuchus. Uniquely, the outer edges of the first pair of sacral ribs are longer than their inner edges. The second pair has a more prominent expansion, also seen in Turfanosuchus, Euparkeria, and Saurosuchus. The two pairs did not contact each other, like Euparkeria. There were at least 16 caudal (tail) vertebrae. Their neural spines do not have accessory processes at their front margins, like Turfanosuchus and Euparkeria but unlike other basal archosaurs. They also lack "tables", unlike Turfanosuchus and Parringtonia.

=== Limbs ===
In the shoulder girdle, the end of the scapular blade is widely and asymmetrically expanded, unlike Turfanosuchus, Batrachotomus, and Ticinosuchus, but similar to the crocodylomorph Dromicosuchus. Unlike Turfanosuchus but like Terrestrisuchus and Dibothrosuchus, the articulation with the radius on the humerus is narrower than the one with the ulna. The width of the bottom end of the humerus is 2.5 times that of the shaft, like Batrachotomus (2.5), Ticinosuchus (2.7), Postosuchus (2.4), and Terrestrisuchus (2.4), but smaller than Turfanosuchus (3.75).

In the pelvis, the ilium has a weakly expanded frontal process, like Turfanosuchus, Euparkeria, Postosuchus, and Caiman. The front of the articulation with the pubis reaches further than the process, like Turfanosuchus, Euparkeria, Saurosuchus, Postosuchus, and Lagerpeton. Meanwhile, the rear process is long, like Turfanosuchus and Postosuchus. There is a shelf along the bottom of this process, most similar to those of Terrestrisuchus, Dromicosuchus, and Marasuchus. The sacral ribs articulate at this shelf, unlike Turfanosuchus where the shelf is located above. The acetabulum, or hip socket, of Gracilisuchus was larger than other archosauriforms. Like Turfanosuchus, Marasuchus, Lagerpeton, and other archosaurs, the acetabulum does not bear a perforation, and there is a buttress above the acetabulum for the femur.

Unusually, but like Tropidosuchus, Protosuchus, and Orthosuchus, the articulation with the ilium on the pubis is short. There is a small bony tongue projecting downwards from this articulation, which has only been recognized in Postosuchus. There is no prominent surface of the acetabulum on the pubis, nor is there a visible articulation with the ischium; the former is similar to Fasolasuchus and Orthosuchus, and the latter is similar to living crocodilians. An L-shaped lamina is present on the rear surface of the "apron" of the pubis. The articulation between the two halves of the ischium is characteristically close to the top of the bone, with the separated portion being only 22% the length of the bone; Ornithosuchus may have a similar condition.

Roughly the bottom 55% of the femur is bowed, resulting in a sigmoidal shape. The top of the femoral head is expanded towards the midline, with the expansion closely resembling those of Fasolasuchus, Postosuchus, and the phytosaur Parasuchus. There is also a small forward projection like Pseudohesperosuchus. Like Macelognathus and Trialestes, the fourth trochanter, an archosauriform characteristic, is poorly-developed. On the bottom end, the groove separating the articulations with the tibia and fibula is shallow, like Turfanosuchus, Euparkeria, Tropidosuchus, Riojasuchus, Marasuchus, and Lagerpeton. Depressions on the rear and outer surfaces are equally poorly-developed, as in Aetosauroides and Marasuchus. The tibia is 90% of the femur's length, like other basal archosaurs, with a straight shaft, like Euparkeria, Aetosauroides, Neoaetosauroides, Fasolasuchus, Postosuchus, and Lagerpeton. The bottom end of the bone is wider than it is long, like Dromicosuchus. There is a bend about a quarter of the way down from the top of the fibula, where the elongate, weakly-developed iliofibular trochanter is located. Euparkeria, Marasuchus, Terrestrisuchus, Dromicosuchus, and Effigia have a similarly poorly-developed trochanter.

Like Turfanosuchus and other members of the Crurotarsi, Gracilisuchus has a "crocodile-normal" ankle joint, with the astragalus and calcaneum being joined with a "peg-and-socket" joint. Unlike Turfanosuchus, Euparkeria, and Marasuchus, the astragalus has a "screw-joint" articulation with the tibia, with slightly divergent articulating surfaces. Like Turfanosuchus and Euparkeria, the hollow on the front of the astraglus covers more than half of the surface. Unlike those two, the inner face of the astragalus has one flat surface instead of two. The calcaneum has a "sliding" articulation with the fibula like Turfanosuchus and other pseudosuchians. There is a notch on the back of the bone, like in Turfanosuchus, Aetosauroides, Fasolasuchus, Dromicosuchus, Protosuchus, and Caiman. The tuber beside the notch is directed backwards and is wider than high, like Turfanosuchus and aetosaurs. There are five digits in the foot, with the number of phalanges being preserved on each digit being 2-3-2-2-1 from the first digit to the fifth; the first digit is completely preserved.

=== Osteoderms ===
Gracilisuchus bore two rows of bony plates known as osteoderms above its neck and torso, with the first pair beginning immediately behind the skull. They do not appear to continue over the hip; this may be associated with the lack of "tables" in the neural spines of the rear vertebrae, or it may be an artifact of preservation. Like Turfanosuchus, Ticinosuchus, Saurosuchus, and Qianosuchus, there were two pairs of osteoderms over each vertebra. Each osteoderm slightly overlaps the one immediately behind it, and the left osteoderm of each row is slightly further forward than the right, creating an asymmetrical appearance. This staggered arrangement is also seen in Euparkeria, Ticinosuchus, Nundasuchus, Qianosuchus, Prestosuchus, and Saurosuchus.

While osteoderms from the frontmost row are triangular, osteoderms further behind are leaf-shaped. These leaf-shaped osteoderms have small forward projections where they meet each other at the midline, like Turfanosuchus and Euparkeria but unlike Postosuchus, Batrachotomus, and Saurosuchus, which possess osteoderms with forward projections situated further to the sides. The surface of each osteoderm bears a longitudinal midline crest, with a depression on either side. This is similar to Saurosuchus and Batrachotomus, but unlike Turfanosuchus, Euparkeria, Erpetosuchus, Parringtonia, and Postosuchus, which all have crests not on the midline. Different specimens of Gracilisuchus have different osteoderm surface textures; some are smooth like Turfanosuchus, while others bear radial pits and grooves like Erpetosuchus.

== Classification ==
=== Interpretation as an ornithosuchid ===
Romer considered Gracilisuchus to be, "quite clear[ly]", a relative of the Scottish Ornithosuchus, owing to similarities in skull structure and other skeletal features. When Alick Walker described Ornithosuchus in 1964, he suggested that Teratosaurus and Sinosaurus were its closest relatives, collectively forming the family Ornithosuchidae. He further suggested that they were theropod dinosaurs. At this time, theropods were divided into two groups following Romer's 1956 classification: the Coelurosauria (long-necked, small-headed theropods) and Carnosauria (short-necked, large-headed theropods). Walker considered ornithosuchids to belong to the latter group, due to strong morphological similarities between the limb girdles of Ornithosuchus, Albertosaurus, Gorgosaurus, and Antrodemus (=Allosaurus). He identified ornithosuchids as the ancestral Triassic stock from which Jurassic and Cretaceous carnosaurs originated.

This assessment remained fairly popular in ensuing years, and was adopted by Romer for the 1966 edition of his textbook Vertebrate Paleontology. By the time of Romer's description of Gracilisuchus in 1972, the geographic range of ornithosuchids had expanded to include the Argentinian Venaticosuchus and Riojasuchus, which had been referred to the family by Bonaparte in 1969. Romer noted that Gracilisuchus was the smallest and oldest known member of the group to date, and accordingly had a fairly basal morphology (notwithstanding supposedly aberrant traits such as the partial closure of the infratemporal fenestra). However, he had reservations regarding Walker's identification of ornithosuchids as dinosaurs, noting basal archosaur traits such as the closed acetabulum, osteoderms, and crocodile-normal ankle. Thus, he considered the supposedly carnosaurian features to be products of convergence.

=== Reidentification as a non-ornithosuchid ===
Doubts arose in following years regarding whether Gracilisuchus was actually referable to the Ornithosuchidae. In 1979, Arthur Cruickshank separated pseudosuchians ("crocodile-line" archosaurs) into two groups based on whether they bore "crocodile-normal" or "crocodile-reversed" (where the peg and socket are located on the opposite bones) ankles. He observed that, while Gracilisuchus had a "crocodile-normal" joint, other ornithosuchids had a "crocodile-reversed" joint; he thus removed Gracilisuchus from the Ornithosuchidae. Donald Brinkman noted in 1981 that, without further information regarding the origin of "crocodile-reversed" joints, it would be possible that "crocodile-normal" joints represent the basal condition, which was retained in Gracilisuchus, with "crocodile-reversed" joints representing a specialization of later ornithosuchids.

However, at the same time, Brinkman noted a number of other traits in Gracilisuchus that differ from "advanced" ornithosuchids. These include the rectangular antorbital fenestra; the rounded bottom of the eye socket due to the absence of a prominent projection of the jugal bone in front of the eye; the tall, slender quadratojugal bone; the lack of a gap between the teeth of the premaxilla and maxilla; the rectangular infratemporal fenestra; a concave flange on the rear of the squamosal bone; the rear of the mandible of the lower jaw being unforked, and extending backwards only above the mandibular fenestra; the splenial bone forming the bottom of the jaw as opposed to being restricted to its inner surface; the lack of keels in the cervical vertebrae; and the presence of two osteoderm rows over each vertebra instead of one. The first, fourth, and fifth of these are shared with Euparkeria, leading Brinkman to consider them as basal traits; however, Euparkeria is more similar to "advanced" ornithosuchids with respect to the other traits.

According to Brinkman, this left two possibilities: either Gracilisuchus was derived from the basal ornithosuchid condition in a manner different from other ornithosuchids, or it represents a different evolutionary radiation altogether, separate from the ornithosuchids. He noted intriguing similarities between Gracilisuchus and members of the Sphenosuchia; the third and sixth of the above traits are shared with Sphenosuchus and Pseudohesperosuchus, while the ninth is shared with Lewisuchus. Thus, in a phylogenetic tree, Brinkman tentatively depicted Gracilisuchus as being closer to the "crocodile-line" Erythrosuchidae, the Rauisuchidae, and the Stagonolepididae (=Aetosauria) than the Ornithosuchidae and the Euparkeriidae.

=== Inclusion in the Suchia and Crurotarsi ===
Phylogenetic analysis soon supported Brinkman's hypothesis that Gracilisuchus was closer to "crocodile-line" archosaurs. In 1988, Michael Benton and James Clark published a phylogenetic analysis incorporating Gracilisuchus and 16 other taxa. It was recovered as a member of the Suchia, a group defined by Bernard Krebs as being characterized by a "crocodile-normal" ankle, among other characteristics. Within the Suchia, they found that Gracilisuchus was the sister taxon of crocodylomorphs and "pseudosuchians" (which they restrictively defined to include rauisuchids and stagonolepidids). It was differentiated from the latter two by the presence of postparietals and the absence of: a pit between the basioccipital and basisphenoid bones; fusion between the atlas (first cervical) and the intercentrum, an element below the axis; accessory processes on the caudal neural spines; and osteoderms on the bottom of the tail. Meanwhile, ornithosuchids were closer to dinosaurs in the Ornithosuchia, and Euparkeria was the sister taxon of the group containing suchians and ornithosuchians.

In 1990, Paul Sereno and Andrea Arcucci suggested that ornithosuchids - in which they included Gracilisuchus - were actually closer to the conventional "crocodile-line" archosaurs than dinosaurs. They named the collective group of Suchia, Ornithosuchidae, and Parasuchia (=Phytosauria) as the Crurotarsi, and noted some uniting characteristics: the strong inward arch of the top of the humerus; the bottom end of the fibula being wider than the top; the specialized "sliding" articulation between the fibula and calcaneum; the "screw-joint" articulation between the tibia and astragalus; the robust tuber of the calcaneum, with a flared bottom end; and a "recess" at the back of the top end of the pubis. Gracilisuchus was identified as an exception for additional uniting traits, such as the robust trochanter on the fibula and the single row of osteoderms per vertebra. This classification was further revised by Sereno in 1991, when he removed Gracilisuchus from the ornithosuchids, and used it to define Suchia's contents.

=== Phylogenetic "limbo" ===
Subsequent analyses did not reach a consensus on the relationships between Gracilisuchus and other crurotarsans. Despite this ambiguity, Gracilisuchus has been widely used as the staple outgroup, or taxon representing a basal condition, in analyses of more derived pseudosuchians such as crocodylomorphs, including both crocodyliforms and sphenosuchians (now known to be a paraphyletic assemblage of non-crocodyliform crocodylomorphs).

J. Michael Parrish's 1993 analysis noted that a "splint-like" fifth metatarsal in the foot, likely a consequence of the compaction of the foot, united Gracilisuchus with its sister group, the newly defined Paracrocodylomorpha (Poposauridae and Crocodylomorpha). They formed the Rauisuchia along with the Rauisuchidae. However, Parrish also noted that Gracilisuchus differed from other rauisuchians in the absence of an ossification at the back of the top of the skull, and the absence of a fenestra between the premaxilla and maxilla. In a 1994 analysis, Lars Juul moved Gracilisuchus inside the Paracrocodylomorpha, placing it as the sister taxon of Postosuchus (then a poposaurid). Paracrocodylomorpha, in turn, was united with the Ornithosuchidae to form the Dromaeosuchia. Both analyses suggested that the squamosal flange of Gracilisuchus was homologous with that of Postosuchus and crocodylomorphs.

Descriptions of material from Erpetosuchus in the early 2000s were accompanied by further analyses incorporating Gracilisuchus. In a 2000 description of North American material, Paul Olsen, Hans-Dieter Sues, and Mark Norell recovered Gracilisuchus as more derived than Stagonolepis but more basal than Postosuchus, Erpetosuchus, and crocodylomorphs. Later, in a 2002 revision of the genus, Benton and Walker found contrasting hypotheses for the position of Gracilisuchus: as being more derived than a group containing Ornithosuchus and rauisuchians (Saurosuchus, Batrachotomus, Prestosuchus); or being in a polytomy with Ornithosuchus and rauisuchians. In both cases, it was more basal than the same group in Olsen and colleagues' analysis, being united by a ridge on the squamosal bone above the supratemporal fenestra and the absence of a foramen on the quadrate.

In an analysis for the 2004 second edition of The Dinosauria, Benton performed another phylogenetic analysis, finding Gracilisuchus to be the sister taxon of the Phytosauria (by then renamed from the Parasuchia). They formed a polytomy with Ornithosuchidae, which was in a basal position relative to the Suchia (defined to include Stagonolepididae, Postosuchus, and Crocodylomorpha), Fasolasuchus, and the Prestosuchidae. Later, in 2006, the same relationship with the Phytosauria was recovered by Chun Li and colleagues in a phylogenetic analysis conducted for the supplementary material of the description of Qianosuchus. They found that group to be in a polytomy with Ornithosuchidae; Qianosuchus; the group of Postosuchus and Crocodylomorpha; and the group of Stagonolepididae, Fasolasuchus, and Prestosuchidae.

Stephen Brusatte, Benton, Desojo, and Max Langer conducted the most comprehensive phylogenetic analysis at the time in 2010. They noted Gracilisuchus had been a "singleton" taxon in prior analyses, one that couldn't be definitely placed in any particular group. In their own analysis, Gracilisuchus was the sister taxon of a group containing Erpetosuchus and the Crocodylomorpha, which along with the Aetosauria (by then renamed from the Stagonolepididae) formed one branch of the Suchia. Although they found strong support for this grouping in the form of eight synapomorphies (shared traits), with two of them (involving the ossification and position of the perilymphatic foramen of the braincase) being unambiguous, later assessment noted that this may have resulted from poor non-rauisuchian sampling. Meanwhile, Revueltosaurus and ornithosuchids formed a group on the opposite branch of the Suchia, being closer to rauisuchians.

In 2011, Sterling Nesbitt conducted another, better-sampled phylogenetic analysis. Contrary to Parrish and Juul, he found that Gracilisuchus acquired a squamosal flange independently of Postosuchus and crocodylomorphs. Although he recovered a variety of positions for Gracilisuchus in different trees, all of them agreed that Gracilisuchus was a basal suchian, and was closer to crocodylomorphs than the non-archosaurian phytosaurs. The consensus found Gracilisuchus to be in a polytomy with a group of Revueltosaurus and Aetosauria; Turfanosuchus; and a group of Ticinosaurus and Paracrocodylomorpha. He noted that the removal of Turfanosuchus allied Gracilisuchus with ornithosuchids in one possible tree, with this relationship being based upon unambiguous synapomorphies such as the presence of three premaxillary teeth; the length of the pubis being more than 70% that of the femur; the pubis being longer than the ischium; the presence of a midline gap at the bottom of the ischium; and the lack of a "hook" at the top end of the fifth metatarsal.

=== Formation of the Gracilisuchidae ===
The redescription of the hindlimbs of Gracilisuchus by Lecuona and Desojo in 2011 allowed additional data to be incorporated into subsequent analyses. Lecuona and Desojo also noted that the poor development of the fourth trochanter and femoral head was shared with members of the Sphenosuchia, which allowed for the possibility that they formed a monophyletic group. However, they also noted that Nesbitt's analysis provides support for a position outside the Crocodylomorpha, due to the absence of a perforated acetabulum.

In 2014, an analysis led by Richard Butler, modified from that of Nesbitt, suggested for the first time that Gracilisuchus formed a group with Turfanosuchus and Yonghesuchus, two basal suchians with similarly convoluted taxonomic histories. The group was named the Gracilisuchidae. They found that Gracilisuchidae was the sister taxon of a group containing Ticinosuchus and the Paracrocodylomorpha, with all of these collectively forming the sister taxon to a group consisting of Revueltosaurus and the Aetosauria; both sub-groups had previously been recovered by Nesbitt. Strong support was obtained for the Gracilisuchidae in the form of six unambiguous synapomorphies: a process on the back of the premaxilla that fits into a slot on outer surface of the nasal bone; the nasal bordering the top of the antorbital fenestra; the tapering frontal bone; the presence of a depression on the bottom of the calcaneal tuber; the osteoderms bending downwards at their outer edges; and the presence of a triangular process bearing a clear apex on the maxilla.

Within the Gracilisuchidae, Butler and colleagues noted that Gracilisuchus was likely closer to Yonghesuchus than Turfanosuchus, on account of three synapomorphies: the contact between the squamosal and postorbital bones continuing backwards along much of the former's bottom surface; the jugal stopping short at its rear end of the infratemporal fenestra; and the conjunction of the basisphenoid and parasphenoid being located between plate-like, triangular projections of the basioccipital known as tubera, with the basipterygoid processes at the base of the basisphenoid being at least 1.5 times longer than it is wide. However, poor support for this relationship was obtained, partially due to the incompleteness of material referred to Yonghesuchus.

Lecuona, Desojo, and Pol conducted another analysis, building upon the work of Butler and colleagues as well as Lecuona's 2013 thesis, in 2017 to accompany their redescription of Gracilisuchus. They uncovered the same phylogenetic arrangements within the Gracilisuchidae and in relation to other pseudosuchians. However, their analysis was able to provide a well-resolved tree even with the inclusion of the erpetosuchids (Erpetosuchus and Parringtonia); the inclusion of erpetosuchids had collapsed Gracilisuchidae into a polytomy in Butler and colleagues' analysis. Lecuona and colleagues added two synapomorphies of Gracilisuchidae to those listed by Butler: the absence of the jugal's contribution to the postorbital bar behind the eye socket, and the articulations with the fibula and astragalus forming a continuous structure on the calcaneum. They also removed the original character involving the calcaneal tuber. Finally, they added one synapomorphy uniting Gracilisuchus and Yonghesuchus: the absence of the postorbital's contribution to the border of the infratemporal fenestra.

== Palaeobiology ==
=== Posture ===
Owing to its supposed affinities with Ornithosuchus, Romer reconstructed Gracilisuchus as a facultative biped in his initial description. Both Walker and Bonaparte noted that the forelimbs of ornithosuchids were considerably reduced relative to the hindlimbs, with likewise reduced fingers that were more suitable for grasping than locomotion. Although the hand is not preserved in Gracilisuchus, Romer noted that its forelimbs were three-fifths the lengths of the hindlimbs, like ornithosuchids; however, this interpretation was based on material which has since been reassigned.

== Palaeoecology ==
=== Stratigraphic context ===
The locality where Gracilisuchus was discovered is known as the Los Chañares locality, and is located at 29°49′8.9″S 67°48′47.9″W. It consists of badlands at the base of a latitudinal escarpment, with the exposed rocks being composed of feldspar and quartz grains, along with glass shards, embedded in a geology silica and clay. These rocks belong to the lower portion of the Chañares Formation, which locally overlies the Tarjados Formation and underlies the Los Rastros Formation. Starting about 10 metres (33 ft) above the boundary between the Tarjados and Chañares Formations, brown concretions of carbonate are present throughout the rock. It is in these concretions that the remains of Gracilisuchus and other tetrapods have been found.

Unlike other Carnian (Late Triassic) formations, there are no dinosaur remains in the Chañares Formation. This has led researchers to assign a Middle Triassic age to the Chañares. Owing to shared faunal components, correlations with the Dinodontosaurus Assemblage Zone of the Santa Maria Formation in Brazil have been used to assign a Ladinian age to the Chañares. Argon–argon dating of the Ischigualasto Formation (which locally overlies the Los Rastros) in 1993 also produced an age near the Ladinian–Carnian boundary, thus constraining the Chañares to the Ladinian. However, more accurate uranium–lead dating subsequently necessitated revisions of the geologic time scale. The Ischigualasto was reassigned to the late Carnian, making a Carnian age possible for the Chañares. This was reaffirmed by uranium-lead dating of Chañares deposits in 2016, indicating an early Carnian age of 236 to 234 million years.
