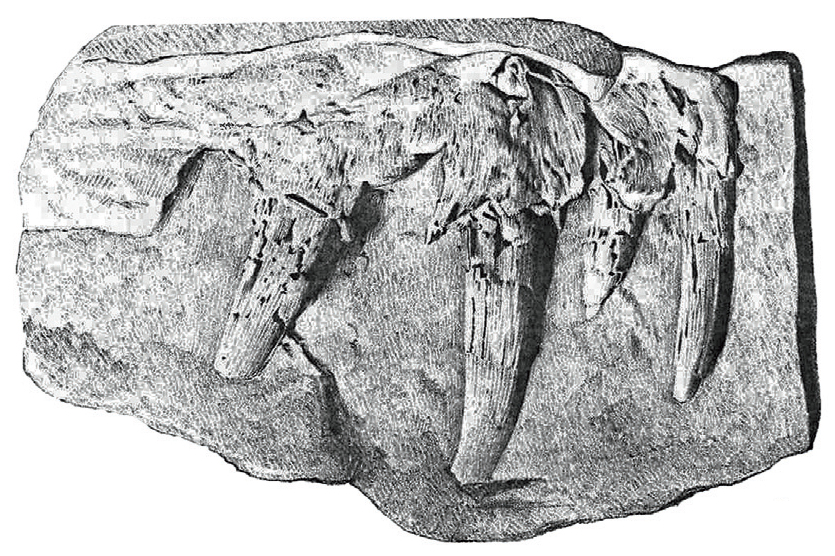
- 1877 drawing of the cast from the holotype natural mold

Scientific classification
- Domain: Eukaryota
- Kingdom: Animalia
- Phylum: Chordata
- Class: Reptilia
- Clade: Archosauria
- Clade: Pseudosuchia
- Genus: †Dasygnathoides; Kuhn, 1961
- Species: †D. longidens

Binomial name
- †Dasygnathoides longidens (Huxley, 1877)

Synonyms
- "Dasygnathus" longidens (Huxley, 1877)

= Dasygnathoides =

Dasygnathoides Temporal range: Late Triassic Carnian

Extinct genus of reptiles

Dasygnathoides is an extinct genus of pseudosuchian from the Late Triassic (Carnian) Lossiemouth Sandstone of Scotland.

== Classification ==
"Dasygnathus" longidens was erected by Thomas Huxley for a maxilla from the Lossiemouth Sandstone in 1877. The genus name Dasygnathus had already been used for a coleopteran insect, so Oskar Kuhn renamed it Dasygnathoides. Although synonymized with Ornithosuchus by Walker (1964), a 2016 study found Dasygnathoides indeterminate beyond Pseudosuchia. For this reason, many paleontologists consider 'Dasygnathoides' a nomen dubium.

The lack of synapomorphies shared by ornithosuchids indicates that Dasygnathoides was not an ornithosuchid as previously thought, but there are no links between it and any other family of pseudosuchians. It has remained impossible to resolve further. The morphology of the maxilla is quite different from aetosaurs, silesaurids, erpetosuchians, saurischians or ornithischians. The interdental plates also differ greatly from erythrosuchids and proterosuchids. Dasygnathoides cannot be assigned to any particular group of pseudosuchians at present. It is probably the first or only specimen of an entirely new group.

== History ==
Thomas Huxley first found the maxilla in the Lossiemouth Sandstone in 1859, and originally identified it as Stagonolepis, due to its very similar tooth implantation pattern. He later changed his mind and reidentified it as a new species, "Dasygnathus". This name later had to be changed in 1961 as it had already been used for a beetle.

In 1964, the specimen of Dasygnathoides was compared with all the known Ornithosuchus specimens and then synonymized by Walker. This was due to the shared presence of 'rear forking' at the posterior end of the maxillae, only nine maxillary teeth, and the similarity between their right pterygoid bones.

In 2016, M. Belén von Baczko and M. Ezcurra reassessed this synonymization and found that Dasygnathoides was in fact a much larger and quite different species to Ornithosuchus, and not even an ornithosuchid.

== Features ==
Dasygnathoides is known from a right maxilla and pterygoid, a partial vertebra, a haemal arch and a phalanx, an articular and an osteoderm. They all come from the same animal. There was also a small radius and ulna found in the slab, but this was far too small to have been from the same specimen and can probably be discounted as stomach contents.

The total skull length is estimated to have been about 450 mm, almost twice as long as the largest Ornithosuchus skull found, and the entire animal was probably between 3 and 4 metres long. It is the largest predatory tetrapod known from Triassic Scotland.

=== Maxilla (ELGNM 1) ===
The maxilla found has four teeth remaining in it and nine interdental plates, showing that five teeth are missing. The total length of the maxilla is 195 mm and the teeth range from 29.5 mm to 53.5 mm long. The teeth are posteriorly curved and have sharp edges, indicating that they might have been used as blades to slice flesh rather than merely to impale and grip. The interdental plates are pentagonal, would have formed the medial walls of the tooth sockets, and in life were richly supplied with blood vessels, giving them a rather wrinkled look.

No ascending or palatal process can be found on the specimen, and nor can the 'rear forking prong' mentioned above. Indeed, the prong mentioned can only be found on a single specimen of Ornithosuchus.

=== Pterygoid (ELGNM 15) ===
This specimen shows the dorsal surface of the right pterygoid bone, and a small part of either a palatine or vomer bone. It is 164 mm long. The anterior ramus is narrow and tapering, but the medial margin is thick and the quadrate ramus is almost as wide as it is long. Th quadrate ramus is dorsally curved and bears a groove extending anterolaterally.

Unlike Ornithosuchus, Dasygnathoides did not appear to have a palatine-pterygoid fenestra as the homologous area of bone is curved outwards. This indicates that, in fact, it is not an ornithosuchan at all.

The partial vertebra is found in the same piece of stone as the maxilla. It has a well-developed transverse process and is probably a dorsal or anterior caudal vertebra.

=== Haemal arch & phalanx (ELGNM 15) and possible articular (ELGNM 29) ===
These are small and fragmentary, and little information can be gained from them. It is possible that they are, in fact, stomach or throat contents of the actual Dasygnathoides fossil.

=== Osteoderm (ELGNM unnumbered) ===
This was previously identified as a possible nasal bone, but is far more likely to be an osteoderm indicating that Dasygnathoides had skin armour. It resembles the elongated osteoderms of Ornithosuchus.

== Sources ==
- Walker A.D. (1964). "Triassic reptiles from the Elgin area: Ornithosuchus and the origin of carnosaurs". Philosophical Transactions of the Royal Society of London. Series B, Biological Sciences. 248 (744): 53–134. Bibcode:1964RSPTB.248...53W. doi:10.1098/rstb.1964.0009. JSTOR 2416617.
