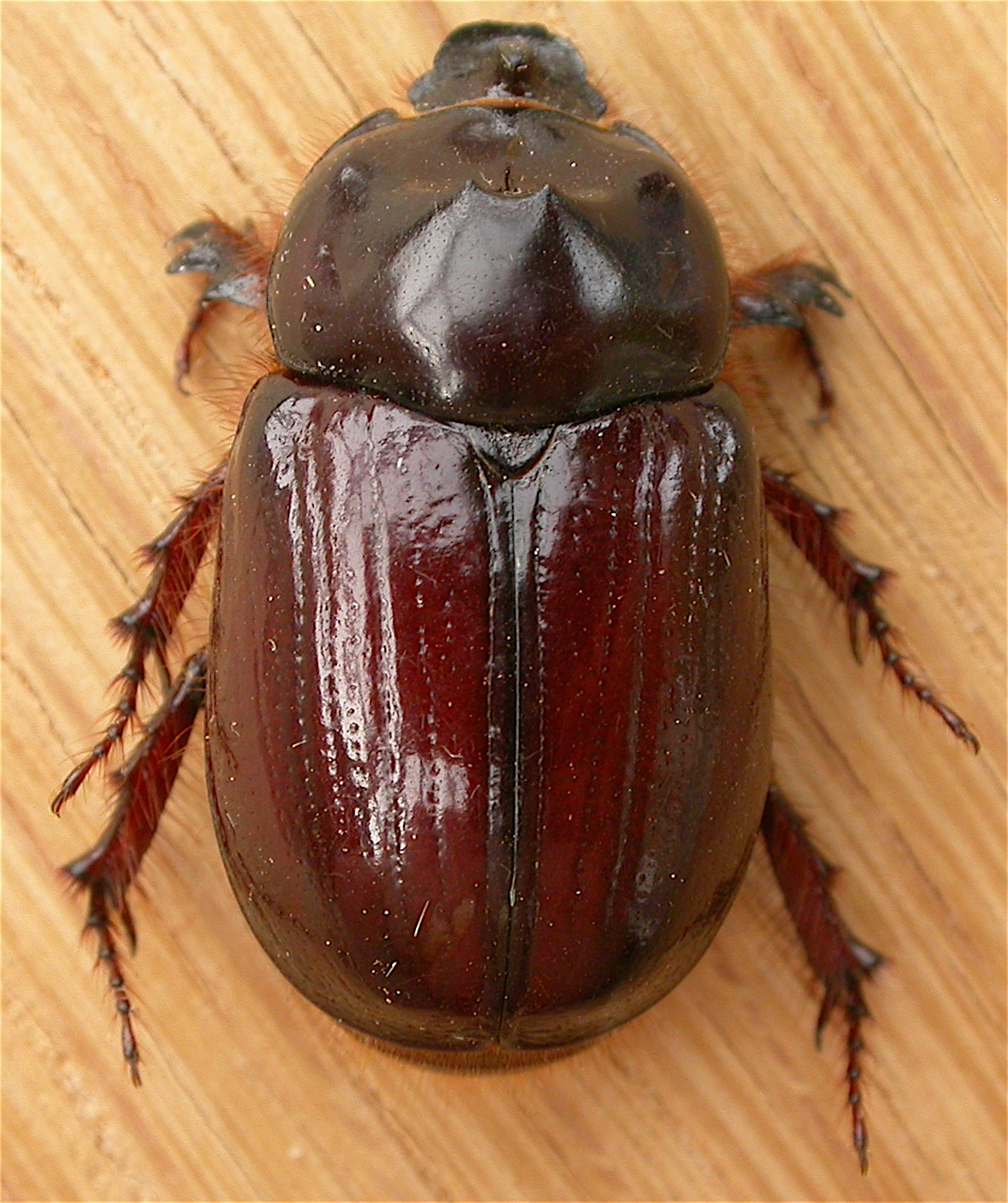

Scientific classification
- Domain: Eukaryota
- Kingdom: Animalia
- Phylum: Arthropoda
- Class: Insecta
- Order: Coleoptera
- Suborder: Polyphaga
- Infraorder: Scarabaeiformia
- Family: Scarabaeidae
- Genus: Dasygnathus
- Species: D. trituberculatus

Binomial name
- Dasygnathus trituberculatus Blackburn, 1889

= Dasygnathus trituberculatus =

Species of beetle

Dasygnathus trituberculatus is a species of large scarab beetle native to Australia.
