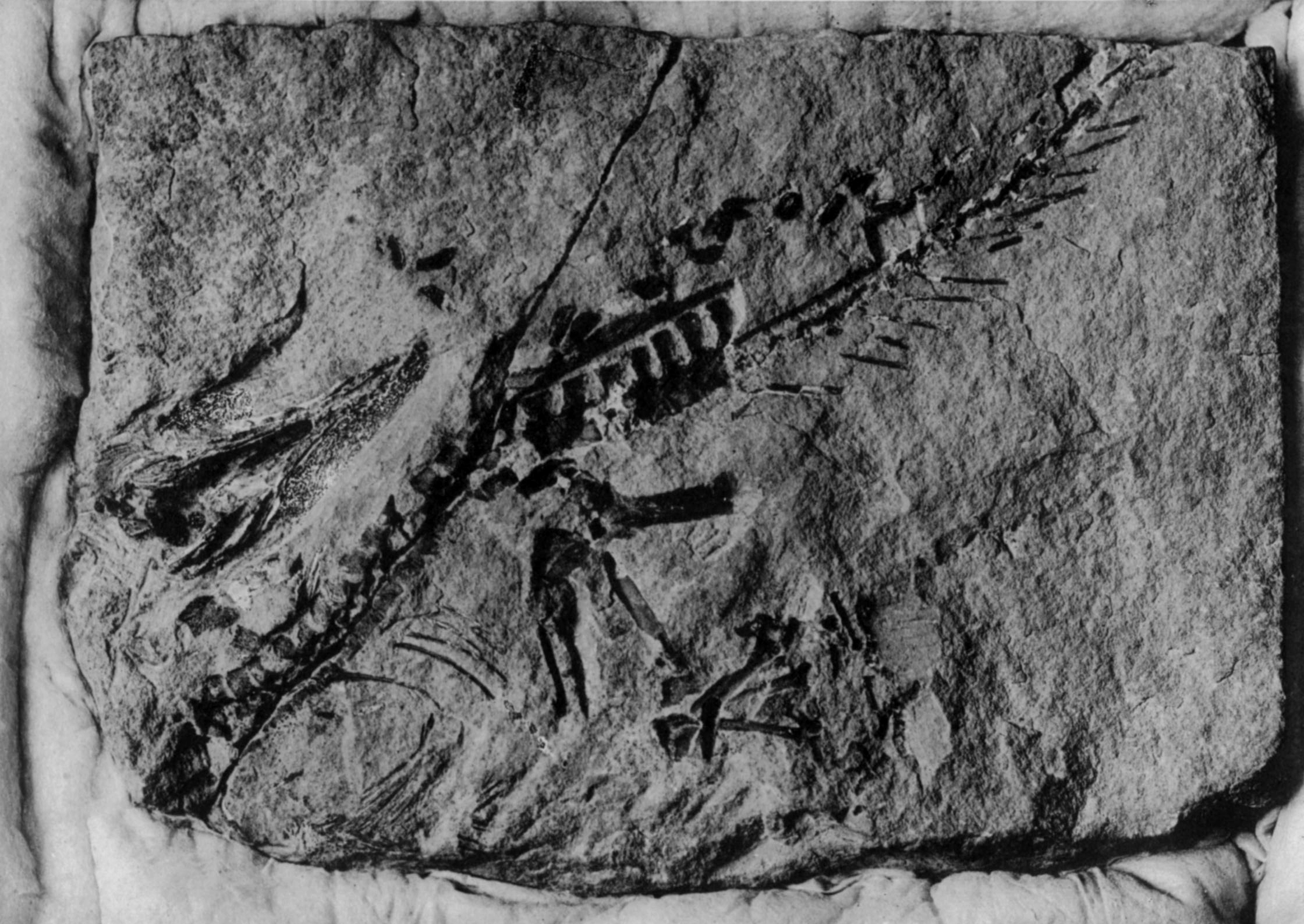
- Holotype specimen

Scientific classification
- Kingdom: Animalia
- Phylum: Chordata
- Clade: Pseudosuchia
- Family: †Ornithosuchidae
- Genus: †Ornithosuchus; Newton, 1894

Type species
- †Ornithosuchus woodwardi Newton, 1894

Other species
- O. longidens?

Synonyms
- Ornithosuchus taylori Broom, 1913

= Ornithosuchus =

Ornithosuchus Temporal range: Late Triassic Carnian

Genus of reptiles

Ornithosuchus (from Greek: ornis, ornithos, "bird" and Greek: souchos, "crocodile") is an extinct genus of pseudosuchians from the Late Triassic (Carnian) Lossiemouth Sandstone of Scotland. It was originally thought to be the ancestor to the carnosaurian dinosaurs (such as Allosaurus), but it is now known to be more closely related to crocodilians than to dinosaurs.

== Description ==
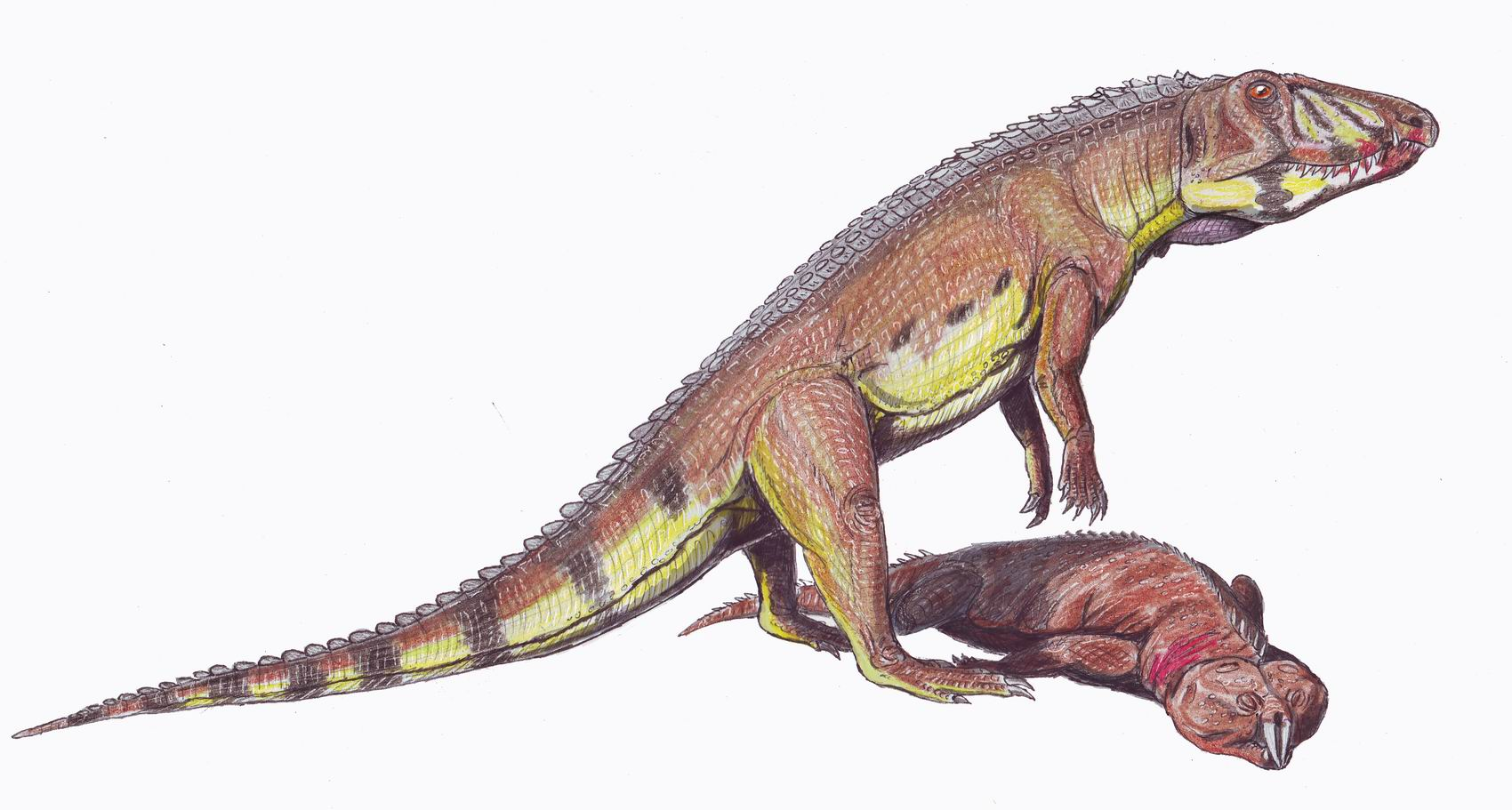
Ornithosuchus and Hyperodapedon

Despite this relationship to crocodiles, Ornithosuchus was able to walk on its hind legs, like many dinosaurs. It probably spent most of its time on all fours, though, only moving bipedally when it needed to run rapidly. Its skull also resembled those of theropod dinosaurs, but its more primitive features included the presence of five toes on each foot and a double row of armoured plates along the animal's back. Ornithosuchus has traditionally been estimated at a length around 4 m (13 ft).

== Classification ==
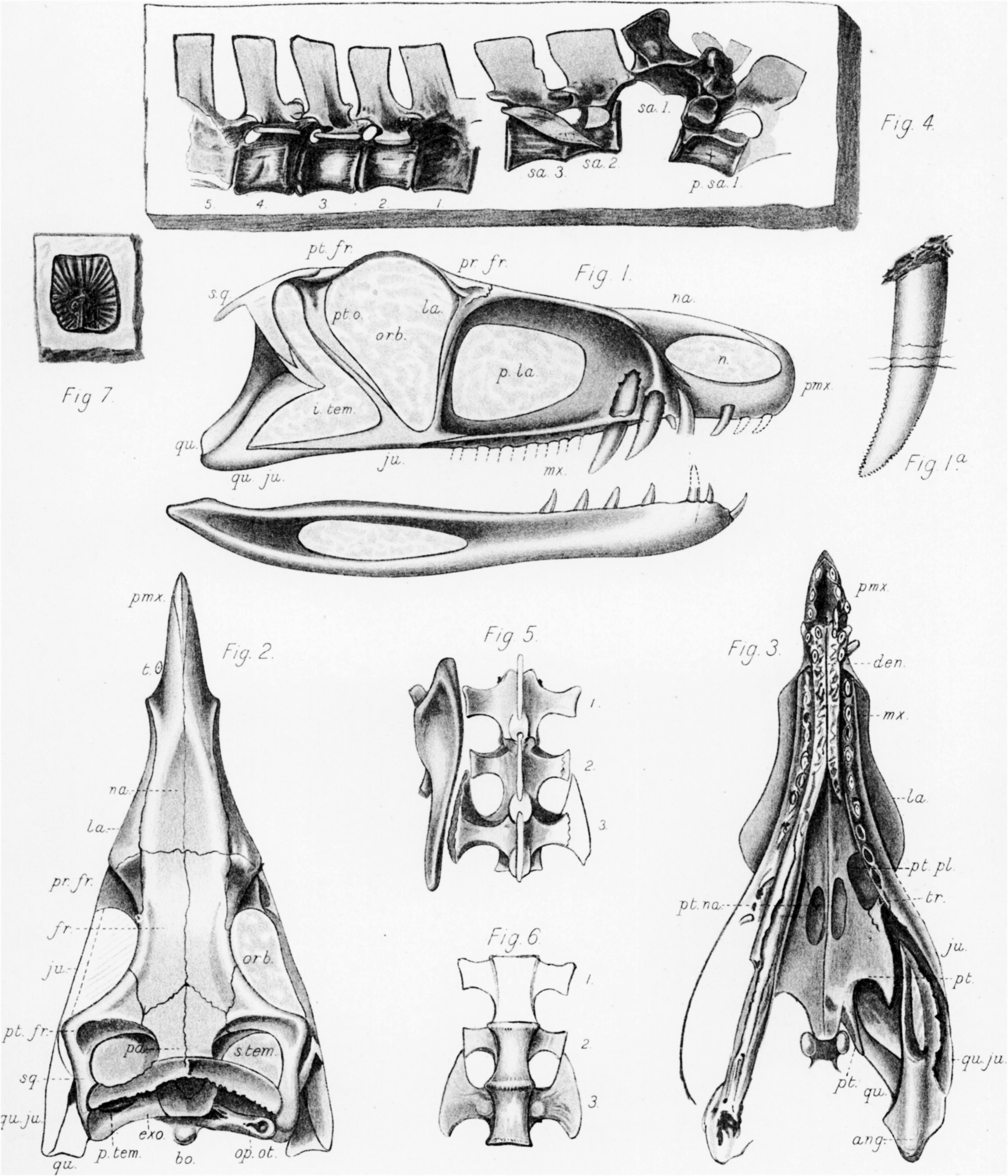
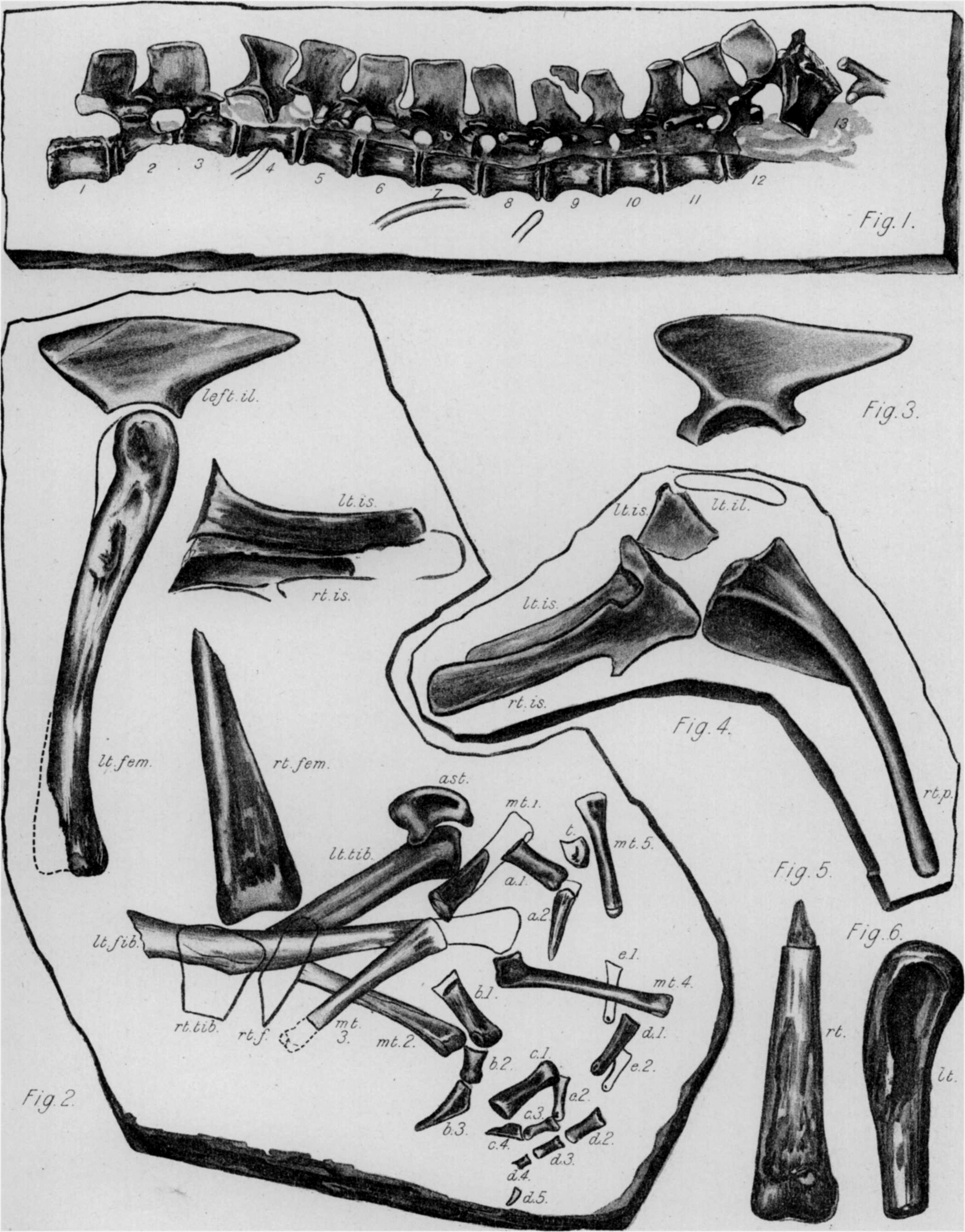
Illustrations of the holotype fossils, 1894

A single species of Ornithosuchus is recognized, O. woodwardi; O. taylori is a synonym.

"Dasygnathus" longidens was in 1877 created by Thomas Huxley for a right maxilla from the Lossiemouth Sandstone found in 1857. The genus name Dasygnathus had already been used for a coleopteran insect, so Huxley's generic name was in 1961 changed to Dasygnathoides. Although synonymized with Ornithosuchus by Walker (1964), a 2016 study found Dasygnathoides indeterminate beyond Pseudosuchia. The maximal length of Ornithosuchus was revised to 2.2 m.

Ornithosuchus is the type genus of the Ornithosuchidae, a family of facultatively biped carnivores that were geographically widespread during the Late Triassic. Three other genera are currently known, Venaticosuchus, Riojasuchus and Dynamosuchus.
