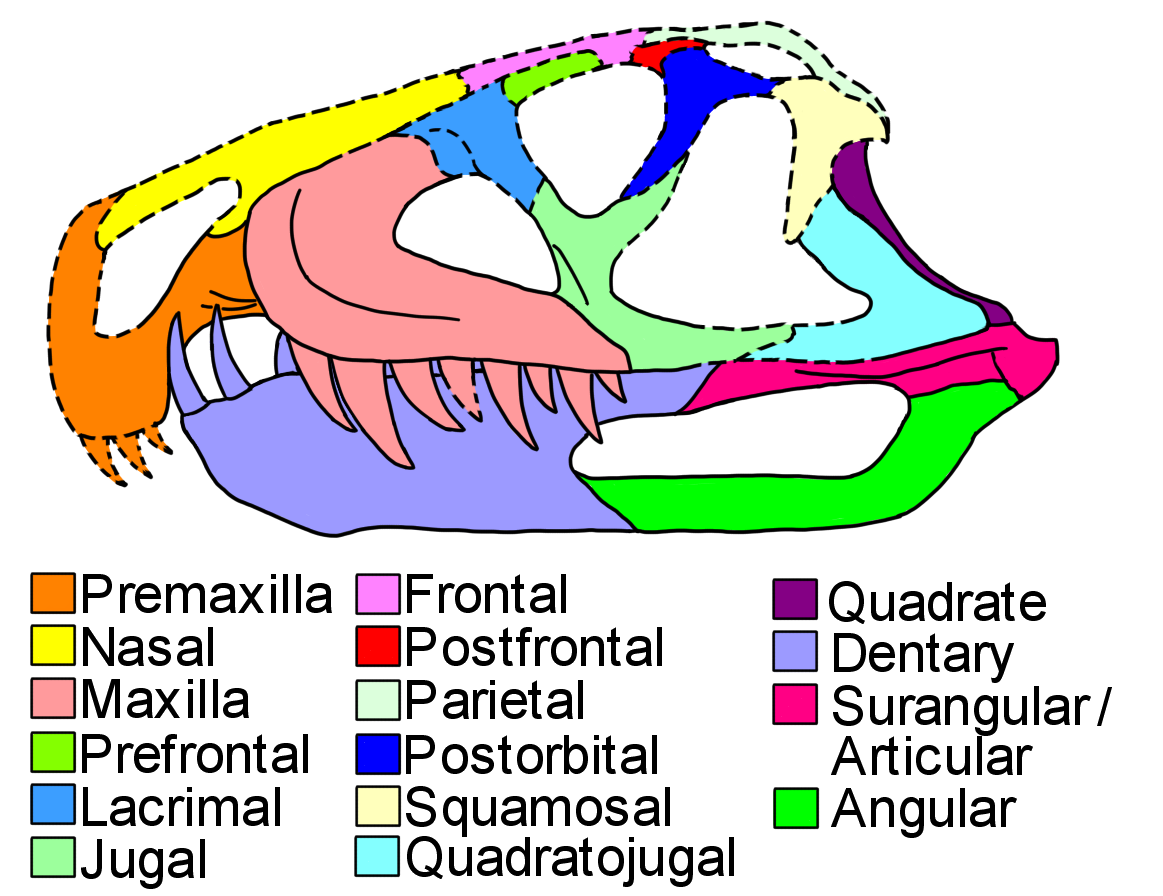
- Skull diagram

Scientific classification
- Kingdom: Animalia
- Phylum: Chordata
- Class: Reptilia
- Clade: Pseudosuchia
- Family: †Ornithosuchidae
- Genus: †Venaticosuchus; Bonaparte 1971

Species
- †V. rusconii Bonaparte 1971 (type)

= Venaticosuchus =

Venaticosuchus Temporal range: Carnian ~231.7–225 Ma

Extinct genus of reptiles

Venaticosuchus is a genus of pseudosuchian archosaurs from the family Ornithosuchidae. Known from a single species, Venaticosuchus rusconii, this genus is described based on an incomplete skull and jaw (as well as a lost partial forelimb and osteoderms) collected from the Late Triassic (Carnian) Ischigualasto Formation in the Ischigualasto-Villa Unión Basin in northwestern Argentina, which was deposited around 230 million years ago. This fossil material has been termed the holotype specimen PVL 2578. Venaticosuchus incorporated a myriad of features present in the other two genera of ornithosuchids, Ornithosuchus and Riojasuchus. However, it also had several unique traits, relating to the lower jaw.

Reconstructions of the jaw musculature of Venaticosuchus showed that it had a slow, strong bite, similar to those of herbivorous aetosaurs such as Desmatosuchus. Venaticosuchus and other ornithosuchids were likely specialized scavengers, due to a combinations of features which suggested that they ate meat but were poorly adapted for dealing with living prey.

== Discovery ==
Fossils of Venaticosuchus have only been recovered, in the early sixties, from a single fossil site in Argentina. This site, located at Cerro Las Lajas in the province of La Rioja, contains outcrops from the middle part of the Ischigualasto Formation, which was deposited in the Late Triassic. The Cerro Las Lajas site has also preserved fossils of Trialestes (one of the oldest crocodylomorphs) and Pisanosaurus (either a silesaurid or one of the oldest ornithischian dinosaurs). However, its overall amount of fossil material is scant relative to other Ischigualasto localities, and few fossils found at Cerro Las Lajas have been found elsewhere in the formation. This makes it difficult to gauge exactly when the Cerro Las Lajas site was formed, but it had to have been between ~231.7 and ~225.0 million years ago, based on radiometric dating of the youngest and oldest rocks in the Ischigualasto Formation. Further excavations at Cerro Las Lajas have revealed more familiar species similar to other exposures of the Ischigualasto Formation. The holotype of Venaticosuchus was found at a level where the most common fossils are from a new species of the rhynchosaur Teyumbaita. Age constraints on this Teyumbaita biozone suggest that it was emplaced between around 227.94 and 227.24 Ma.

Venaticosuchus fossil remains consist of skull and jaw material from a single animal, although much of the braincase and the top part of the skull are missing. The original 1970/1971 description of Venaticosuchus, published by renowned Argentine paleontologist José Bonaparte, derived the generic name from the Latin venaticus, "hunting", and the Latinised Greek suchus, "crocodile". The specific name honoured the paleontologist Carlos Rusconi Sassi, deceased in 1969. It indicated that the fossil also included a partial forelimb and osteoderms (bony scutes), but these remains have not been located by modern paleontologists and are thus considered missing. Bones from the right side of the skull were also considered missing until 2015, when quadratojugal, quadrate, surangular, articular, and angular bones from the right side of the skull were rediscovered. These were described in 2018 as part of a study on ornithosuchid jaw biomechanics. All known fossil material of Venaticosuchus is stored in the vertebrate paleontology collections of the Instituto Miguel Lillo at the National University of Tucumán. There, they are collectively termed the holotype specimen PVL 2578.

== Description ==
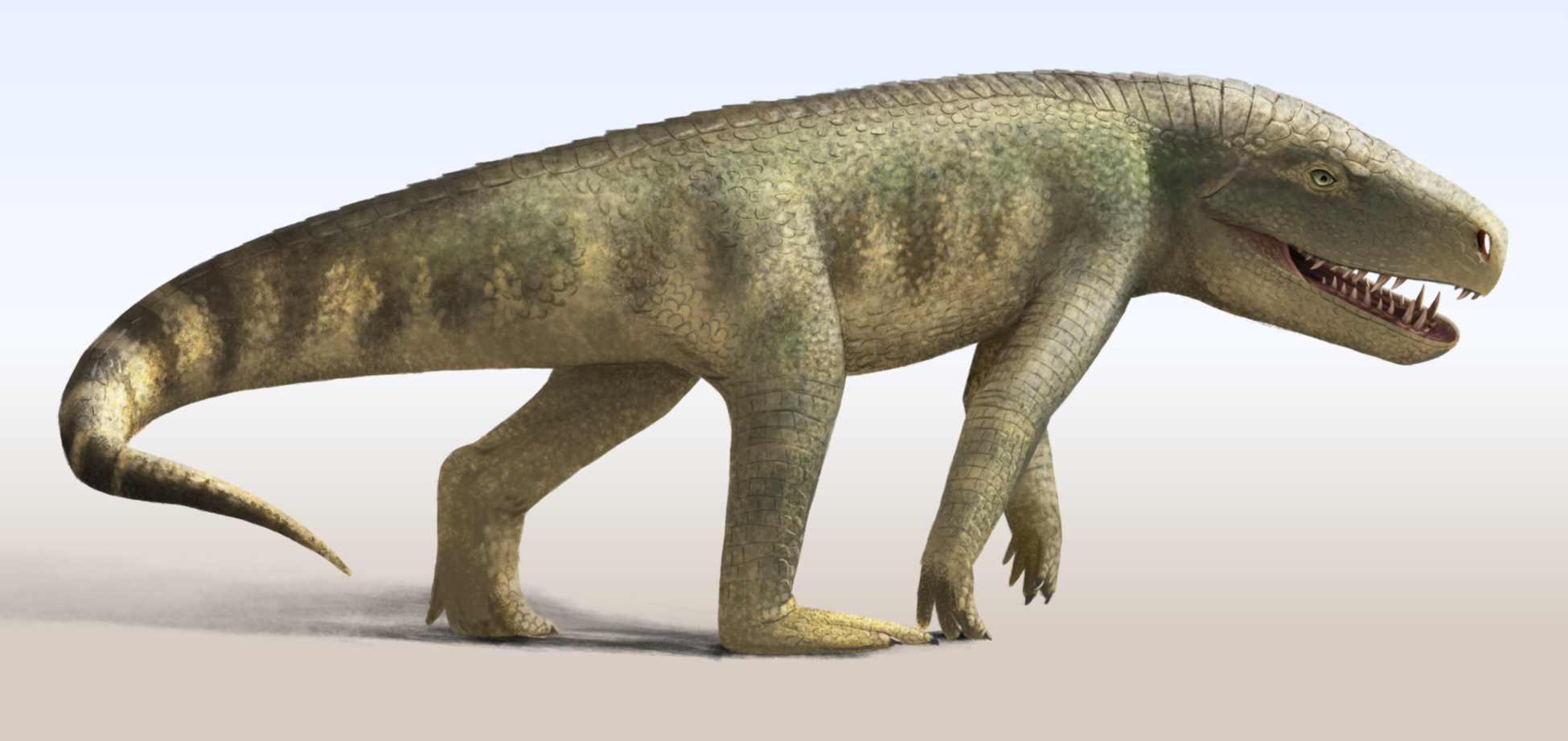
Life reconstruction with speculative oral tissue

The total body length of Venaticosuchus is unknown, considering that only skull and jaw material is known in the present day. The jaw had a total length of 26.0 centimeters (10.2 inches), which was marginally larger than the largest known jaws from Ornithosuchus and Riojasuchus (excluding the massive and enigmatic archosaur "Dasygnathoides", which has historically been considered a synonym of Ornithosuchus). Other ornithosuchids were medium-sized reptiles, slightly less than 2 meters (6.6 feet) in length.

The side of the snout was formed by the toothed maxilla and premaxilla bones, which were separated by a toothless gap known as a diastema. This is similar to the case in other ornithosuchids, and Venaticosuchus particularly resembles Riojasuchus due to the maxilla curving upwards behind the diastema and the premaxilla hooking downwards in front of it. The premaxilla is not preserved well enough to conclude anything about its tooth count, but other ornithosuchids had three premaxillary teeth. The maxilla in general resembles that of Riojasuchus, with a triangular antorbital fenestra with a tapering front tip. On the other hand, the antorbital fossa (the basin in which the antorbital fenestra lies) is shallower, smaller, and more smoothly textured than that of Riojasuchus. There were eight teeth in the maxilla; these teeth were large and serrated, with the second tooth being the largest. They were teardrop-shaped in cross section, unlike other ornithosuchids. Similar to Riojasuchus and the erpetosuchid Pagosvenator, the jugal (cheek bone) had a Y-shaped ascending process (upward-branching bone) which defined the lower edge of the eye socket. The quadratojugal bone (at the rear lower corner of the skull) was L-shaped, with two branches converging at a 45-degree angle. It was also smoother than that of other ornithosuchids, in which there were ridges on the two branches of the quadratojugal. The quadrate bone, which lies adjacent to the quadratojugal and forms the upper half of the jaw joint), forms a steep angle identical to that of the quadratojugal. The quadrate is also smooth, and it encloses a circular hole (only visible from behind) along its contact with the quadratojugal.

Part of the nasal cavity was filled in by sediment, showing that the olfactory bulbs were separated at the midline. The braincase is incomplete, only preserving the parabasisphenoid (the bone which forms the base of the braincase). As with other archosaurs, the rear lower part of the braincase possessed two different pairs of large, rounded plates: The basipterygoid processes (which are positioned at the base of the braincase and contact the roof of the mouth) and the basitubera (which are positioned further up and do not contact any bone, acting as levers for the musculi recti capitis anteriores that make the head nod). The basipterygoid processes are separated from the basitubera by means of a pronounced notch which forms an acute angle (~60 degrees). This angle is more acute than any other early pseudosuchian (for example, Riojasuchus's is about 82 degrees), so it can be considered a unique feature of Venaticosuchus. The basipterygoid processes themselves were also thinner than those of Riojasuchus, and they are separated from each other by a wider gap. The palate (roof of the mouth) was generally similar to that of Riojasuchus.

The mandible (lower jaw) was robust, proportionally more similar to Ornithosuchus rather than Riojasuchus. On the other hand, the mandibular fenestra (a large hole on the side of the jaw) was elongated and proportionally more similar to that of Riojasuchus rather than Ornithosuchus. The dentary (the main toothed bone of the mandible) had a rounded front end which is also expanded upwards. The first two teeth of the dentary were very large, overlapping the snout at the level of the maxillary/premaxillary diastema. This contrasts with other ornithosuchids, which have a smaller tooth in front of the two enlarged teeth. The two enlarged dentary teeth of Venaticosuchus were unserrated and oval-shaped in cross section. Most of the other mandibular teeth could not be assessed due to the overlapping snout obscuring details, but seem to resemble the maxillary teeth. The surangular and articular bones (which form the rear upper part of the mandible) were smooth and thin. These features are unique to Venaticosuchus compared to other ornithosuchids, which have a noticeable pit on both the outer surface of the surangular and the inner surface of the articular. The angular bone (which forms the rear lower part of the mandible) was elongated, forming the entire lower edge of the mandibular fenestra and being covered with striations. Both of these features are also in contrast with other ornithosuchids.

== Paleobiology ==
=== Paleopathology ===
The holotype specimen possessed a peculiar pathology (sign of an injury or disease) on the left side of the skull. Compared to right maxilla and jugal bones, the left maxilla and jugal possessed a heavily swollen, rough-textured area of bone below the eye. In addition, the left maxilla has only six tooth sockets (compared to eight in the right maxilla), with the last two tooth sockets missing. The swollen bone could have been a result of an infection or tumor, or alternatively a healed injury. Considering that there is no evidence of bite marks or bone fractures on the surface of the swollen area, the latter hypothesis seems less likely, so the pathology was likely a facial infection.

=== Jaw musculature ===
Venaticosuchus was the subject of Von Baczko's 2018 study on jaw biomechanics, the first study of its kind to focus on ornithosuchids. The study estimated ornithosuchid jaw musculature using osteological correlates and comparison to modern reptiles such as Caiman yacare and Iguana iguana. It found several interesting results surrounding jaw action between Venaticosuchus, other ornithosuchids, aetosaurs, and modern crocodilians (represented by Alligator mississippiensis). For example, ornithosuchids and aetosaurs had taller skulls than modern crocodilians, creating longer and more vertically inclined moment arms for adductor muscles (i.e. the distance between the jaw joint and the middle of muscles which pull up the jaw). Longer moment arms allow for more torque.

Venaticosuchus had the highest "AM" value (corresponding to the sum of all adductor muscle moment arms) of any of the ornithosuchids, though some of its muscles had lower moment arms than other reptiles sampled. Riojasuchus's jaw musculature was dominated by vertically oriented jaw muscles at the rear of the skull, such as the adductor mandibulae externus (MAME) and adductor mandibulae posterior (MAMP). This is likely a result of its slanted skull, elongating the distance between the top of the skull and the jaw joint. On the other hand, Ornithosuchus had the highest moment arm values for muscles which stretched from the roof of the mouth to the rear of the jaw, such as the pterygoideus dorsalis (MPtD) and pterygoideus ventralis (MPtV). This is probably due to having a high surangular bone of the jaw joint, widening the gap between the palate and jaw muscle attachment points. Venaticosuchus's jaw musculature featured most prominently the intramandibular muscle (MI), which extends from the roof of the mouth to the middle of the jaw. This probably results from its deep jaw, giving the MI a more extensive attachment point. All of the ornithosuchids had comparable contributions from the pseudotemporalis muscle (MPst), which straddles the side of the braincase. Alligator and aetosaurs had more substantial contributions from the MPst. Alligator also received substantial contributions from MAME and MAMP, while MI contributed to a large portion of the AM value in aetosaurs. Aetosaurs also had the highest moment arm for the mandibular depressor muscle (MDM), which lowers the jaw. Venaticosuchus had the lowest value for this muscle, followed by Ornithosuchus. Nevertheless, ornithosuchid jaw musculature (particularly that of Venaticosuchus) generally resembled that of aetosaurs more than modern crocodilians.

Considering the distribution of moment arms and the position of teeth allowed for Von Baczko to estimate bite moment (ease of movement) at the front and rear of the jaw, and to compare the total bite moment to the "AM" value to determine total bite force. Despite its average bite moment, the high AM value of Venaticosuchus gave it the highest ratio between AM and bite moment, corresponding to the highest bite force of any of the reptiles sampled. However, the high AM value also means that the muscles would take longer to retract, giving it a fairly slow bite. This slow, strong bite is also shared by other ornithosuchids as well as the aetosaur Desmatosuchus, but contrasts with the weak, fast bite of the carnivorous basal aetosaur Neoaetosauroides and the fast, moderately strong bite of Alligator.

=== Diet ===
The serrated teeth of ornithosuchids indicates that they ate meat, but their slow bite would have been disadvantageous for catching small prey. In addition, the diastema of ornithosuchids would have weakened the snout, making it more susceptible to damage from large, struggling prey. Their thin teeth were also more structurally weak when dealing with large prey, compared to the conical teeth of modern crocodilians which are sturdy from all directions. Von Baczko (2018) proposed that ornithosuchids were specialized scavengers, which could deal with carcasses using their strong bite force and serrated teeth. In this way their slow bite speed and weak snout structure are not as disadvantageous as they would be if ornithosuchids were active predators.

In a 2023 study, biomechanical analysis again found that the related Riojasuchus had poor resistance to lateral forces and greater resistance to traction and torsion forces, but it was noted that the short mandible (shorter than the upper jaw, as typical for ornithosuchids) did not allow occlusion between the mandibular teeth and those on the premaxilla. Not even the maxillary and posterior mandibular teeth occluded, and therefore did not generate a sharp edge. This dental configuration does not seem suitable for the action of grabbing or slicing pieces of meat from a carcass, thus excluding a scavenger lifestyle. According to this new interpretation, the jaw mechanics are more compatible with a piscivorous lifestyle. Such a lifestyle is not dissimilar to that of a heron or that proposed for Spinosaurus, in which small aquatic animals are captured underwater and swallowed whole. Bipedalism could also have been associated with this lifestyle. These findings may be relevant for other ornithosuchids, such as Venaticosuchus.
