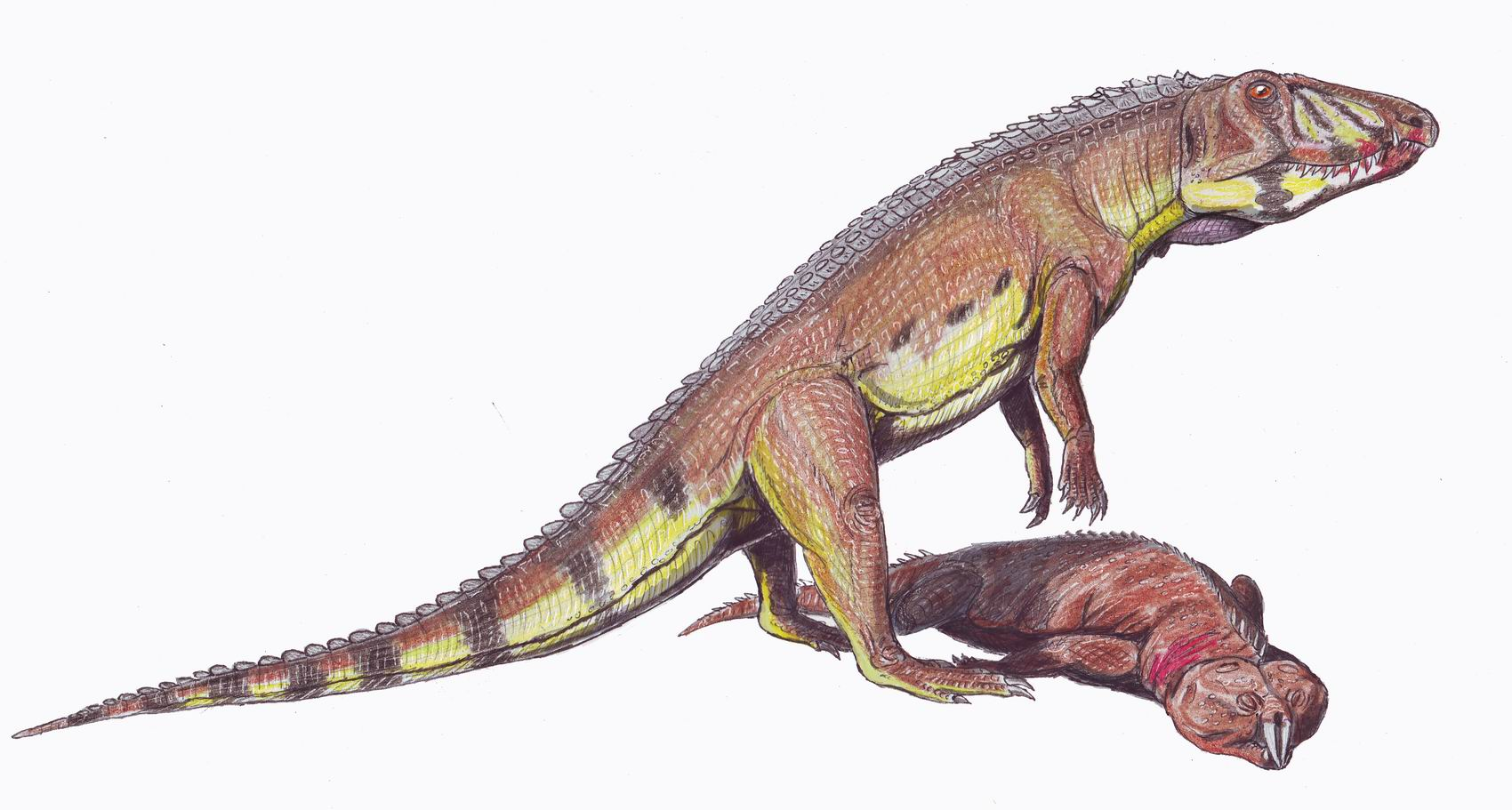
- Life restoration of Ornithosuchus scavenging on the rhynchosaur Hyperodapedon

Scientific classification
- Kingdom: Animalia
- Phylum: Chordata
- Class: Reptilia
- Clade: Pseudosuchia
- Family: †Ornithosuchidae von Huene, 1908

Type species
- †Ornithosuchus woodwardi Newton, 1894

Genera
- †Aenigmaspina?; †Dynamosuchus; †Ornithosuchus; †Riojasuchus; †Venaticosuchus

= Ornithosuchidae =

Ornithosuchids Temporal range: Late Triassic, 228–203.6 Ma

Extinct family of reptiles

Ornithosuchidae is an extinct family of pseudosuchian archosaurs (distant relatives of modern crocodilians) from the Triassic period. Ornithosuchids were quadrupedal and facultatively bipedal (e.g. like chimpanzees), meaning that they had the ability to walk on two legs for short periods of time. They had distinctive, downturned snouts, unique, "crocodile-reversed" ankle bones, and several other features that distinguish them from other archosaurs. Ornithosuchids were geographically widespread during the Carnian and Norian stages of the Late Triassic with members known from Argentina, Brazil, and the United Kingdom. Four genera, comprising Ornithosuchus, Venaticosuchus, Dynamosuchus, and Riojasuchus are presently known. The family was first erected by German paleontologist Friedrich von Huene in 1908.

== Description ==
=== Skull ===
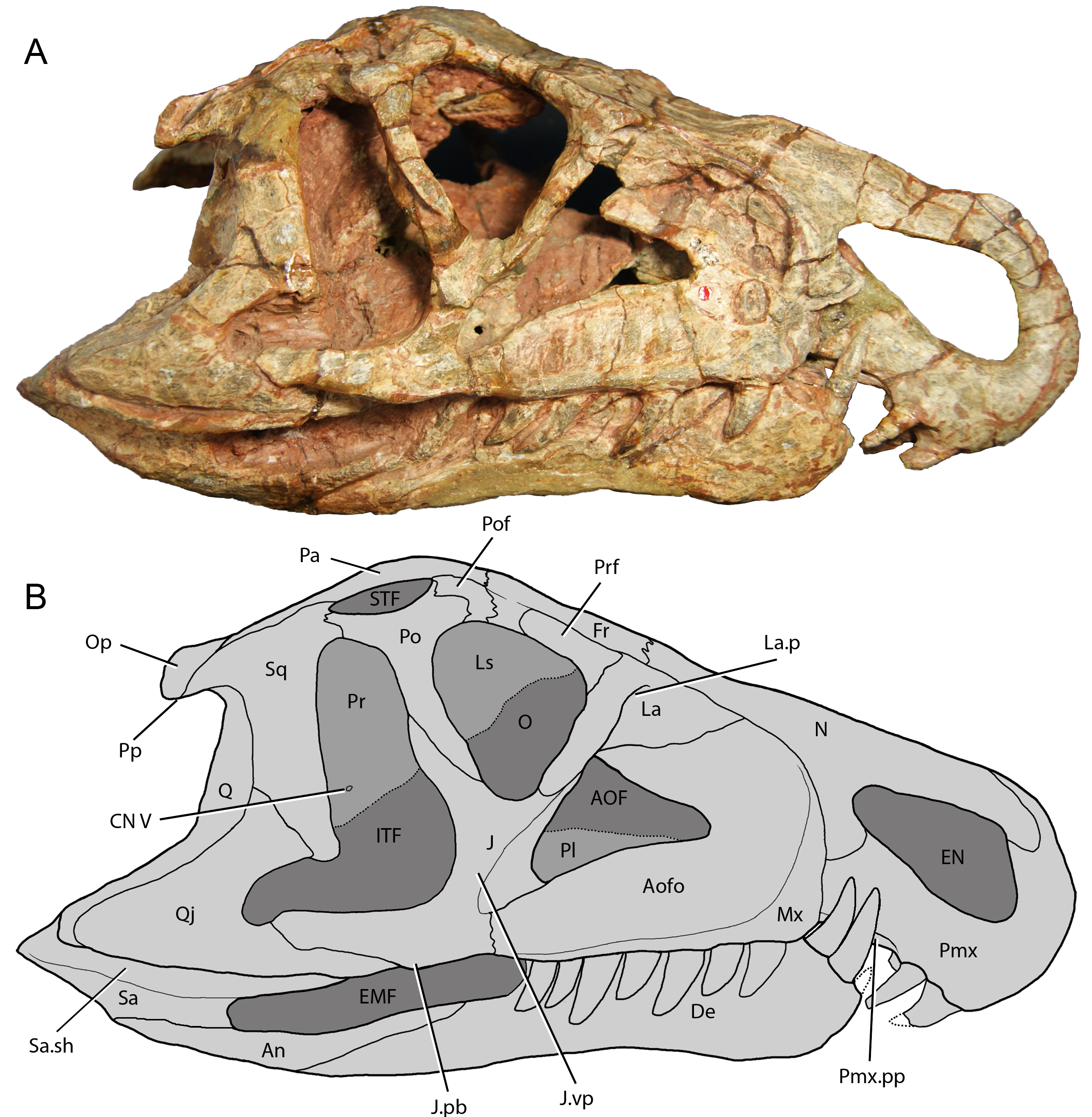
The skull of Riojasuchus

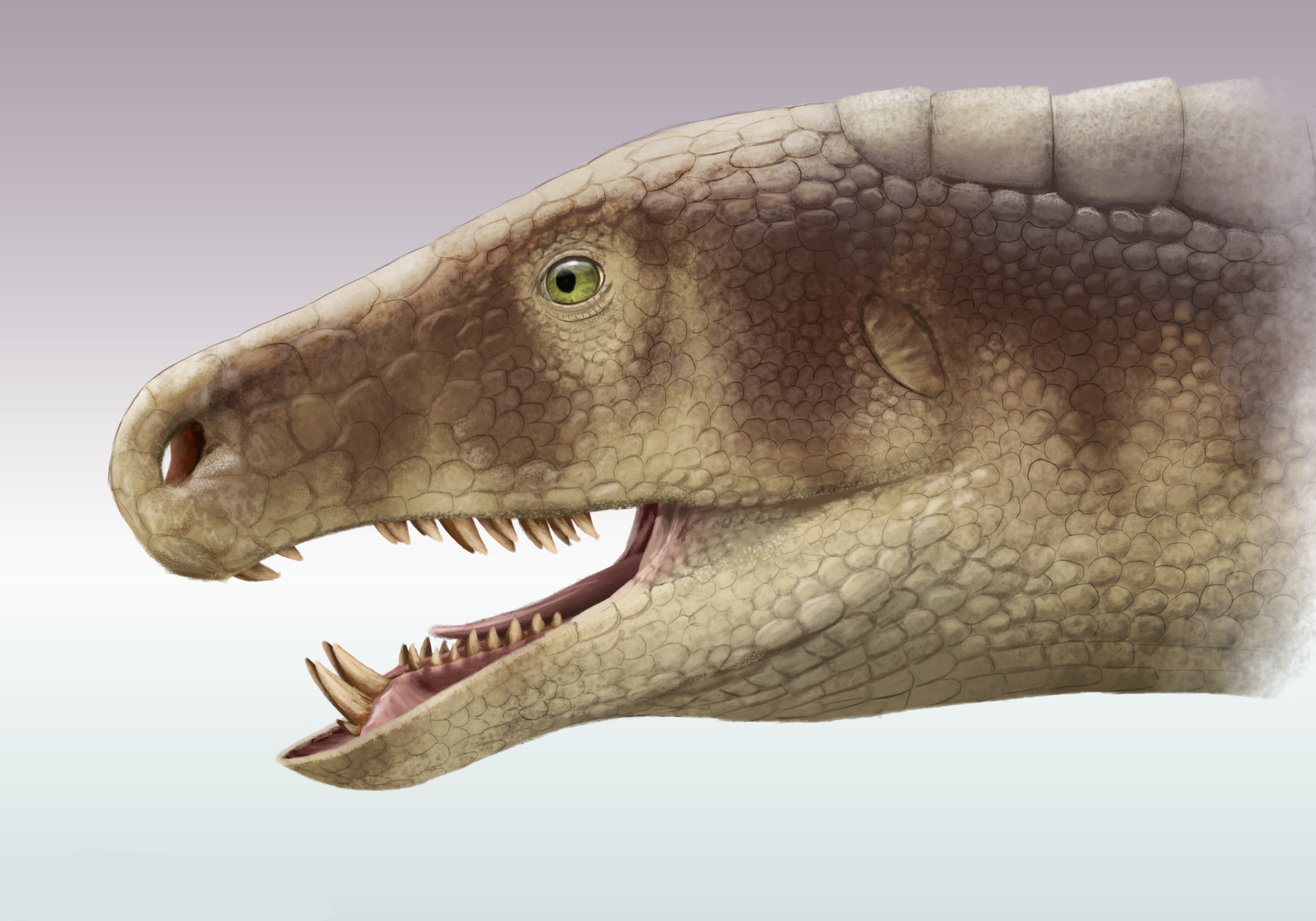
Speculative life restoration of Riojasuchus with oral tissue covering its overbite

Ornithosuchids can be identified by the presence of an arched diastema, a gap between the teeth at the front of the snout. When the jaw is closed, two large, curved, dentary (lower jaw) teeth fit into the diastema, which is positioned between the premaxilla and maxilla. Two shallow depressions are on the wall of the diastema to accommodate these teeth. The large dentary teeth of Ornithosuchus and Riojasuchus are placed behind a smaller, procumbent dentary tooth that sticks out from the jaw. This type of tooth position is not seen in any other basal archosaurs. Another characteristic feature of ornithosuchids is their unusual downturned, overhanging snout, seen in Riojasuchus and Venaticosuchus, but not Ornithosuchus.

Several other features distinguish ornithosuchids from all other early archosaurs. Ornithosuchus and Riojasuchus both possess a small fenestra, or hole, between the palatine and pterygoid bones of the palate, i.e. the roof of the mouth. The contact between the nasal and prefrontal bones of the skull is small or absent, excluded by a large contact between the frontals and lacrimals. In other archosaurs, including rauisuchians, aetosaurs, pterosaurs, and dinosauromorphs, the nasal-prefrontal contact separates the frontal from the lacrimal.

=== Postcranial skeleton ===
The postcranial skeleton is nearly completely known in Riojasuchus, incomplete in Ornithosuchus, and entirely unknown in Venaticosuchus. As a result, whether all of the postcranial traits seemingly unique to ornithosuchids actually occurred in all members of the family is uncertain. Ornithosuchids known from decent postcranial remains typically had about 9 cervical (neck), 14-15 dorsal (back), three sacral (hip), and over 20 caudal (tail) vertebrae. Above each vertebra was a pair of bony scutes known as osteoderms.

The femur (thigh bone) has a pronounced anterior trochanter. The anterior trochanter, sometimes known as the "lesser trochanter" (but unrelated to the lesser trochanter of the femur in humans), is a ridge on the outer surface of the femur, near the femoral head. It was probably an insertion point for m. iliofemoralis cranialis, which helps to raise the leg. Most archosaurs and archosaur relatives lack a distinct anterior trochanter, but ornithosuchids are an exception, along with most dinosauromorphs (dinosaurs and their close relatives).

Much like the femur, the fibula (outer shin bone) also has a distinctive point for muscle insertion. The muscle in question is the iliofibularis, which helps to straighten the limbs. In most archosaurs, the iliofibularis is inserted onto the fibula by means of a tiny ridge on the proximal part of the fibula, near the knee. However, ornithosuchids have a much larger, knob-shaped iliofibularis insertion point located about midway down the shaft of the fibula. Phytosaurs and aetosaurs also share a knob-like attachment point midway down the fibula, so whether the case in ornithosuchids is a unique case of convergent evolution, or alternatively the retention of a trait independently lost by several archosaur lineages is unclear.

Unlike most other early archosaurs, the pedal unguals (the distalmost bones of the feet that form claws) are laterally compressed. They are sharp and recurved. The unguals are very deep, being taller than they are long, especially on the inner digits. This type of claw is not seen in any other Triassic archosaur except for pterosaurs.

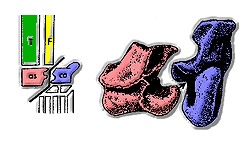
The "crocodile-normal" ankle of most crurotarsans

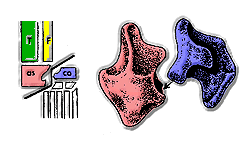
The "crocodile-reversed" ankle of ornithosuchids

Tibia Fibula Astragalus Calcaneum

Major archosaur groups have often been distinguished from each other based on the structure of their ankles. In most crurotarsans, the astragalus has a convex projection that fits into a concave space in the calcaneum. This condition is often referred to as a "crocodile-normal" ankle, as it is the most common ankle type in crurotarsans. Ornithosuchids are unique among crurotarsans, and all other archosaurs, in their possession of a "crocodile-reversed" ankle, in which the placement of the concavity is reversed; instead of being on the calcaneum, it is on the astragalus. In ornithosuchids, the calcaneum bears a convex projection that is analogous to the convex projection on the "crocodile-normal" astragalus.

== Paleobiology ==
Since their discovery, several ecological niches have been proposed for ornithosuchids. In 2018, a study by von Bazcko theorised that ornithosuchids were specialised scavengers, inferred from analysis of the jaw biomechanics of Venaticosuchus. Von Bazcko's conclusion was supported by the fact that Venaticosuchus had both a slow bite and a weak snout, which could have made struggling with large prey difficult, but would not have posed similar challenges when scavenging. While not as detailed in its analysis, this hypothesis was supported by the 2020 study naming Dynamosuchus.

By contrast, a 2023 study on the jaw biomechanics of Riojasuchus by Tarboda et al. instead yielded results that the authors interpreted as being indicative of piscivory. They argued that the dental configuration of Riojasuchus was ill-suited to scavenging, largely due to a lack of apparent occlusion between the mandibular and premaxillary teeth. Taborda et al. compared the jaw musculature of Riojasuchus to the putatively piscivorous theropod Spinosaurus.

In 2025, a study by Sennikov provided another different hypothesis, wherein he proposed that ornithosuchids were 'medium sized hyperanisodont carnivorous macrophages'. This study postulates that ornithosuchids were not only active, terrestrial hunters, but that they specialised in hunting prey the same size as or larger than themselves. He argued that the slow, powerful bite of ornithosuchids would be highly inefficient for piscivory, rebuking the hypothesis laid out by Taborda et al. in 2023. Based on postcrania from Riojasuchus, he posited that ornithosuchids grappled their prey in order to subdue them before delivering the killing blow with their jaws, a hunting methodology that he compared to machairodontines.

== Phylogeny ==
Ornithosuchidae is generally considered to be within the larger clade Suchia, which includes aetosaurs, rauisuchians, and crocodylomorphs. It was given a phylogenetic definition by Paul Sereno in 1991 as the last common ancestor and all descendants of Ornithosuchus, Riojasuchus, and Venaticosuchus. Sterling Nesbitt in 2011 gave an alternative definition consisting of Ornithosuchus woodwardi and all archosaurs closer to it than to Rutiodon carolinensis, Aetosaurus ferratus, Rauisuchus tiradentes, Prestosuchus chiniquensis, Crocodylus niloticus (the Nile crocodile), or Passer domesticus (the house sparrow). Below is a cladogram based on Nesbitt (2011), showing the placement of Ornithosuchidae in Archosauriformes.

- Archosauriformes
  - †Proterosuchidae
  - - †Erythrosuchus
    - - †Vancleavea
      - - †Proterochampsia
        - - †Euparkeria
          - Crurotarsi
            - †Phytosauria
            - Archosauria
              - Avemetatarsalia (bird-line archosaurs)
              - Pseudosuchia
                - †Ornithosuchidae
                - Suchia
                  - †Gracilisuchus
                  - †Turfanosuchus
                  - - †Revueltosaurus
                    - †Aetosauria
                  - - †Ticinosuchus
                    - Paracrocodylomorpha
                      - †Poposauroidea
                      - Loricata
                        - †Prestosuchus
                        - - †Saurosuchus
                          - - †Batrachotomus
                            - - †Fasolasuchus
                              - - †Rauisuchidae
                                - Crocodylomorpha
