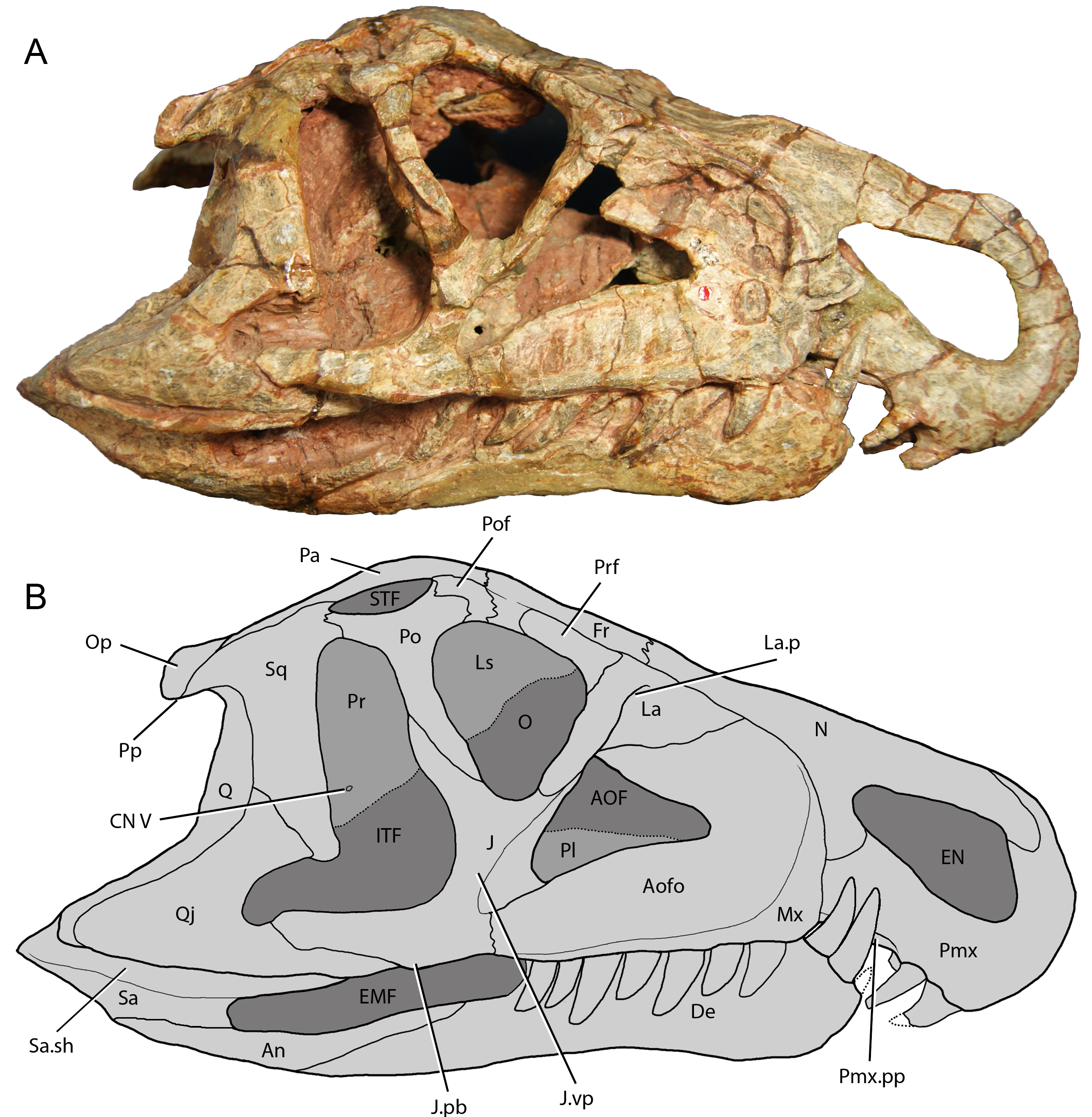
- Holotype skull and diagram
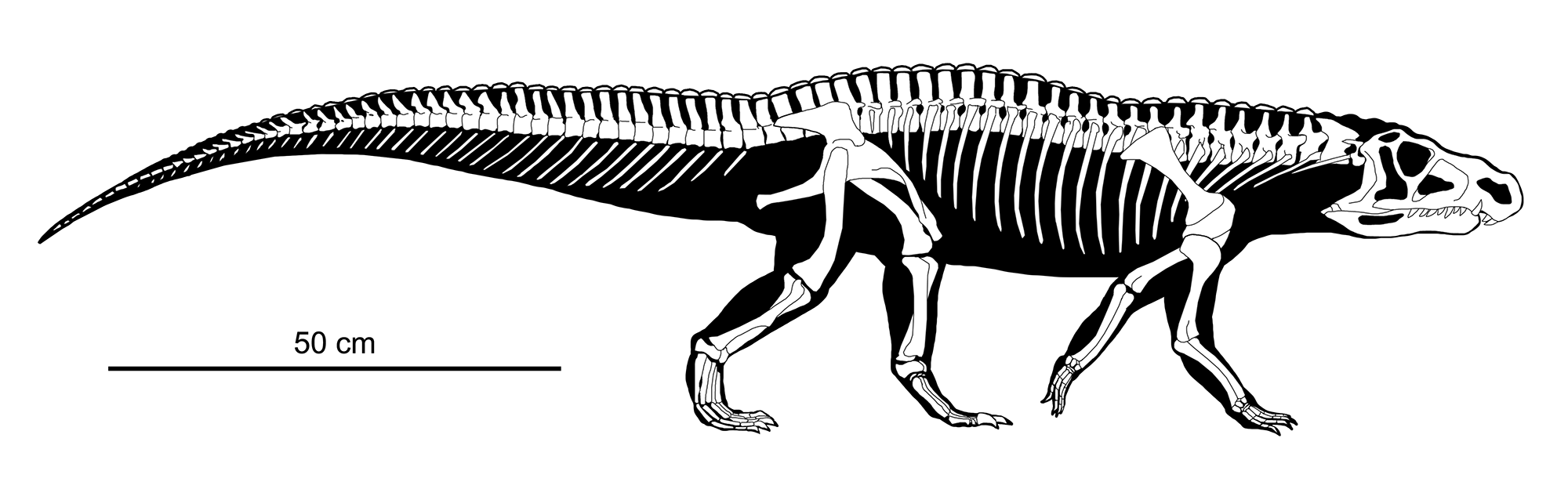
- Skeletal diagram

Scientific classification
- Kingdom: Animalia
- Phylum: Chordata
- Class: Reptilia
- Clade: Pseudosuchia
- Family: †Ornithosuchidae
- Genus: †Riojasuchus; Bonaparte, 1969

Type species
- Riojasuchus tenuisceps Bonaparte, 1969

= Riojasuchus =

Riojasuchus Temporal range: Norian ~217–215 Ma

Extinct genus of reptiles

Riojasuchus is an extinct genus of ornithosuchid archosaur from the Late Triassic (Norian) of Argentina. Ornithosuchidae was a widespread family of facultatively bipedal pseudosuchians (crocodilian-line archosaurs) with adaptations for scavenging. Riojasuchus is notable as one of the youngest and most complete members of the family. The type and only known species, Riojasuchus tenuisceps, was named and described by José Bonaparte in 1967. It was one of the first of many well-preserved Triassic archosaurs to be discovered in Argentina. The holotype specimen, PVL 3827, was found in the Los Colorados Formation of the Ischigualasto-Villa Unión Basin in northwestern Argentina.

== Discovery and naming ==
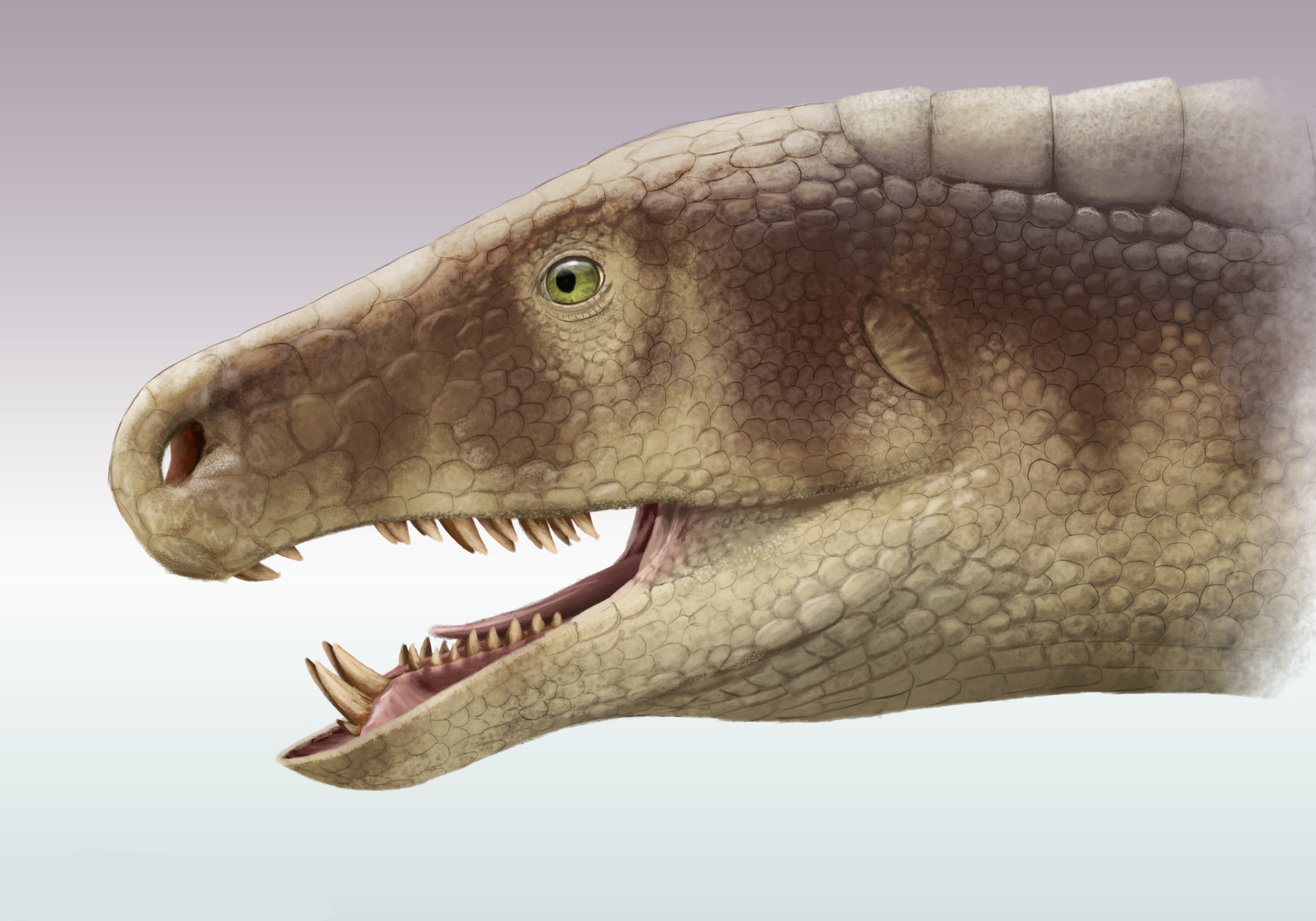
Life reconstruction of the head with speculative open nostril

The holotype specimen is PVL 3827, consisting of a complete skull and mandibles, as well as a nearly complete postcranial skeleton, and it was collected during the late 1960s. Three other specimens are known. PVL 3828 is almost as complete as the holotype, including a nearly complete skull. PVL 3826 consists of articulated vertebrae and limb fragments. PVL 3814 only involves a few fragments of vertebrae, limb bones, and osteoderms.

All four specimens were found close together in the upper section of the Los Colorados Formation. The formation's diverse fossil beds have been radiometrically dated to the mid-Norian stage of the Late Triassic. The fossils are stored in the vertebrate paleontology collection (PVL) at Instituto Miguel Lillo in San Miguel de Tucumán.

Riojasuchus and its fossils were initially described in papers by José Bonaparte in 1967 and 1972. The skull was redescribed by M. Belén von Baczko, Julia B. Desojo, and Denis Ponce in 2016. The postcranial skeleton was redescribed by von Baczko and Desojo in 2019.

== Description ==
The skull of the type specimen is 25 centimetres (9.8 in) long, and has a large, curved snout and short mandibles.

=== Distinguishing characteristics ===
Many characteristics were identified by Bonaparte in 1969. They are listed below:

- a preorbital vacuity well bordered by protruding edges of the smaller preorbital opening, found in Ornithosuchus;
- an outgoing lateral lacrimal edge;
- an infratemporal fenestra present in the shortest adult skull with mandibular fenestra;
- the top of the surangular laterally pointed, and with a small prearticular process;
- short atlas and cervical vertebrae, all with a ventral keel;
- an ilium, pubis and femur, with the talus and calcaneus of the type of Ornithosuchus
- and median orbits with a higher bottom than in Ornithosuchus.

== Classification ==
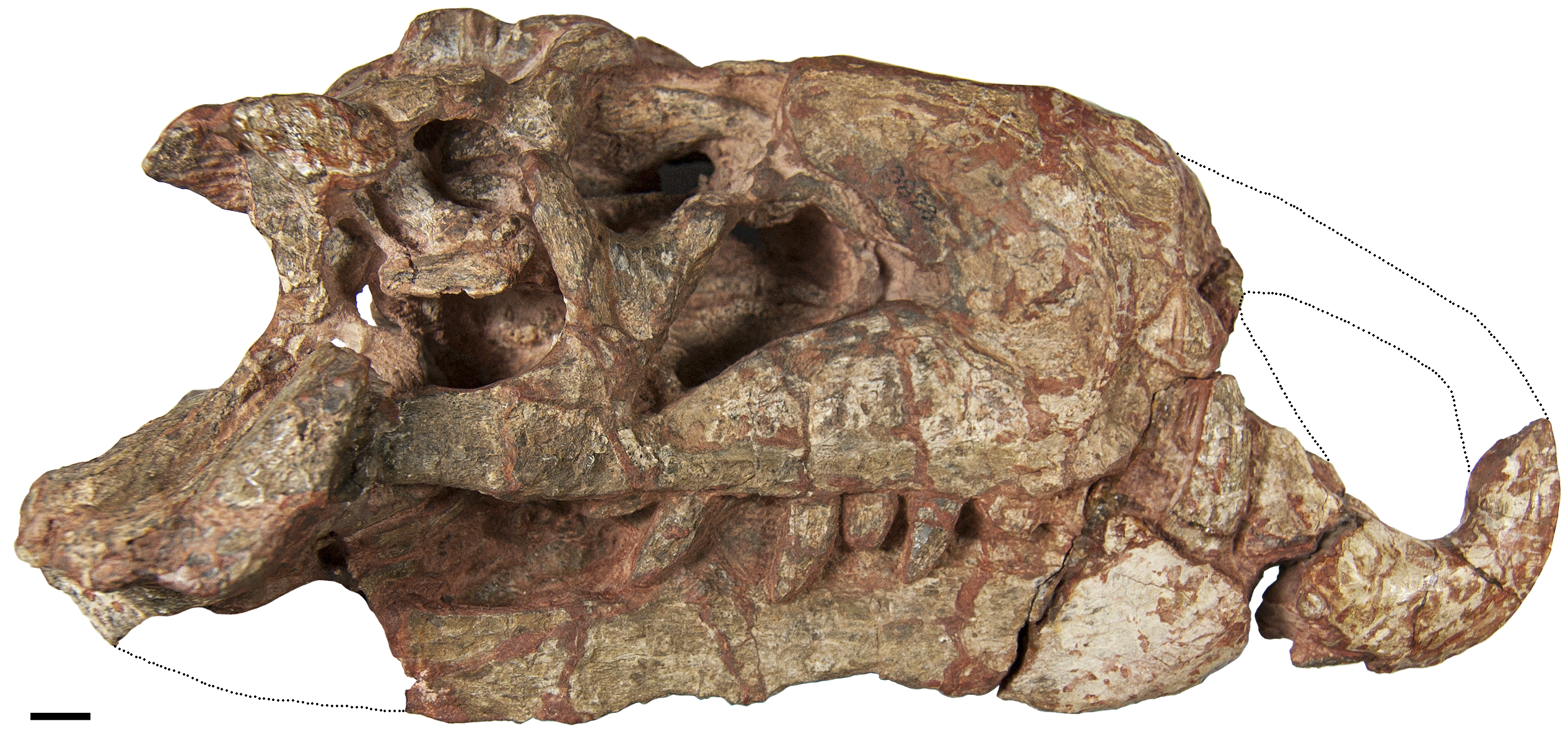
Skull of referred specimen PVL 3828

Riojasuchus is a member of Ornithosuchidae, a family of facultatively bipedal carnivores that were geographically widespread during the Late Triassic. Two other genera, Ornithosuchus and Venaticosuchus, are currently known. The group was originally considered to be related to dinosaurs, before many phylogenetical analyses.

Below is a phylogenetic cladogram by Butler et al. in 2011 showing the cladistics of Archosauriformes, focusing mostly on Pseudosuchia: Clade names follow Nesbitt 2011.

- Mesosuchus
- - Prolacerta
  - Archosauriformes
    - Proterosuchus
    - - Erythrosuchus
      - - Vancleavea
        - - - Proterochampsia
              - Tropidosuchus
              - Chanaresuchus
          - - Euparkeria
            - - Phytosauria
                - Parasuchus
                - - Smilosuchus
                  - Pseudopalatus
              - Archosauria
                - Pseudosuchia
                  - Ornithosuchidae
                    - Riojasuchus
                    - Ornithosuchus
                  - Suchia
                    - Gracilisuchus
                    - Turfanosuchus
                    - - Revueltosaurus
                      - Aetosauria
                        - Aetosaurus
                        - - Stagonolepis
                          - Longosuchus
                    - - Ticinosuchus
                      - Paracrocodylomorpha
                        - Poposauroidea
                          - Qianosuchus
                          - - Ctenosauriscidae
                              - Arizonasaurus
                              - Xilousuchus
                              - Hypselorhachis
                              - Ctenosauriscus
                              - Waldhaus Taxon
                            - - - Poposaurus gracilis H
                                - Poposaurus gracilis Y
                              - - Lotosaurus
                                - Shuvosauridae
                                  - Sillosuchus
                                  - - Shuvosaurus
                                    - Effigia
                        - Loricata
                          - Prestosuchus
                          - - Saurosuchus
                            - - Batrachotomus
                              - - Fasolasuchus
                                - - Rauisuchidae
                                    - Rauisuchus
                                    - - Polonosuchus silesiacus
                                      - Postosuchus alisonae
                                      - Postosuchus kirkpatricki
                                  - Crocodylomorpha
                                    - CM 73372
                                    - - Hesperosuchus agilis
                                      - Hesperosuchus "agilis"
                                      - Dromicosuchus
                                      - Alligator
                - Avemetatarsalia

== Paleoecology ==
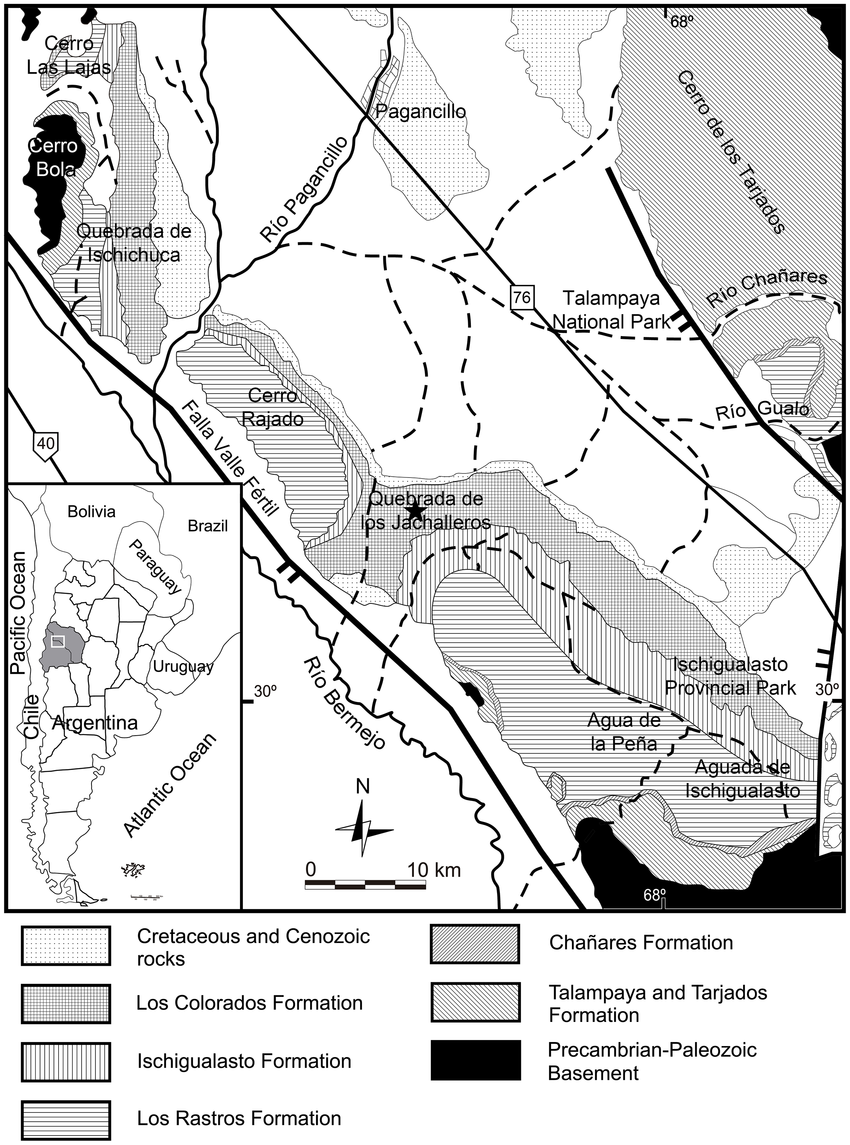
Geological map of the Los Colorados Formation, Argentina, with star indicating the location where the specimens were collected

Based on its skull morphology, R. tenuisceps is believed to have been a wading animal that used its jaws to capture amphibians, fish, and other aquatic prey.

Fossils of Riojasuchas are found in the Los Colorados Formation, a Late Triassic unit in Argentina, and date to approximately 217 to 215 million years ago. At that age, it is the youngest ornithosuchid known. It lived alongside the protosuchid Hemiprotosuchus; the sphenosuchid Pseudohesperosuchus; the stagonolepidid Neoaetosauroides; the melanorosaurid Strenusaurus; and the riojasaurid Riojasaurus.
