= Dasygnathus =

Scientific classification
- Domain: Eukaryota
- Kingdom: Animalia
- Phylum: Arthropoda
- Class: Insecta
- Order: Coleoptera
- Suborder: Polyphaga
- Infraorder: Scarabaeiformia
- Family: Scarabaeidae
- Tribe: Pentodontini
- Genus: Dasygnathus; MacLeay, 1819

Genus of beetles

Dasygnathus is a genus of large scarab beetles found in Australia.

== Species ==
- Dasygnathus blattocomes
- Dasygnathus dejeani
- Dasygnathus globosus
- Dasygnathus trituberculatus
