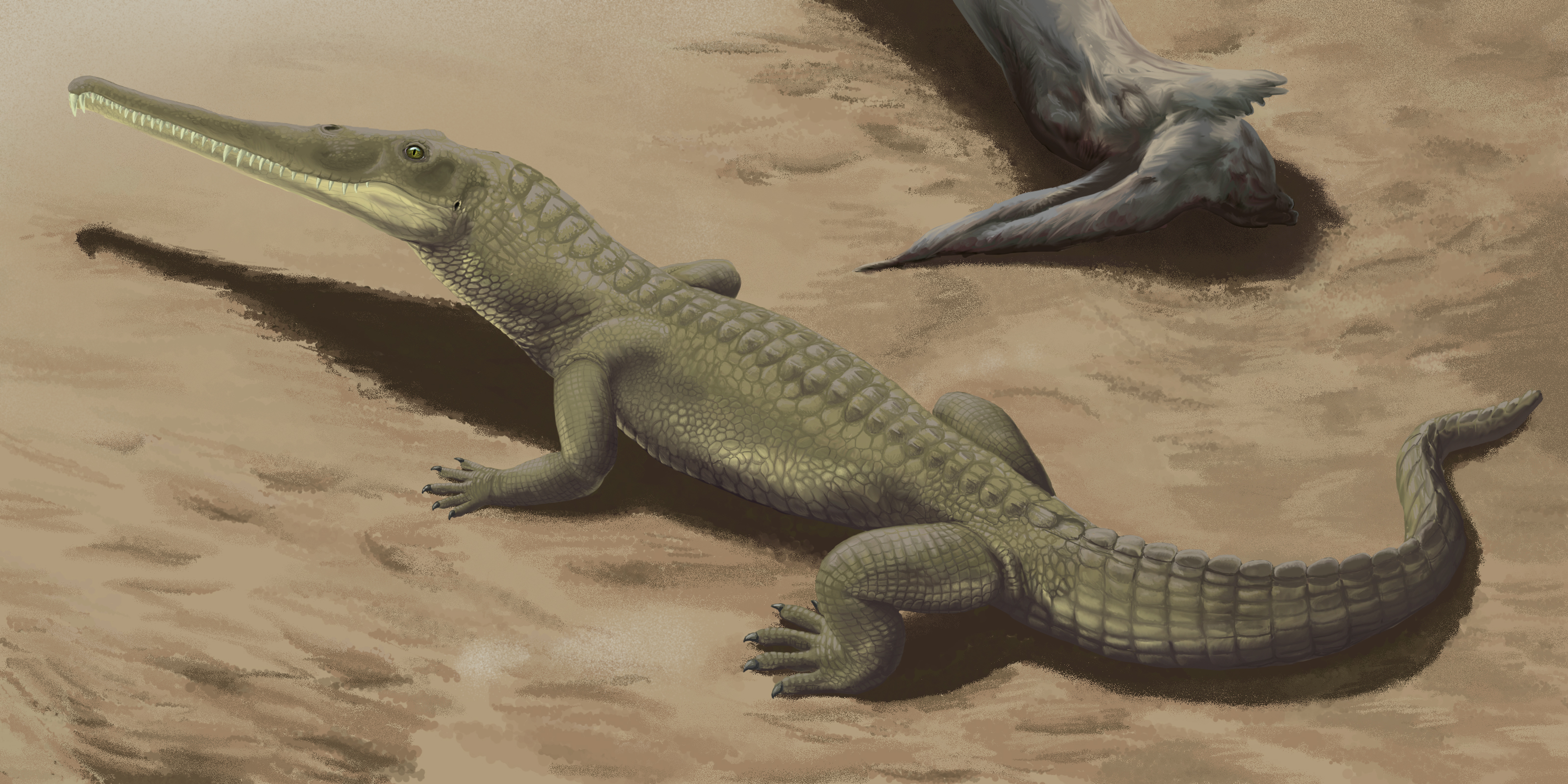
- Life restoration of Protome batalaria, a phytosaur
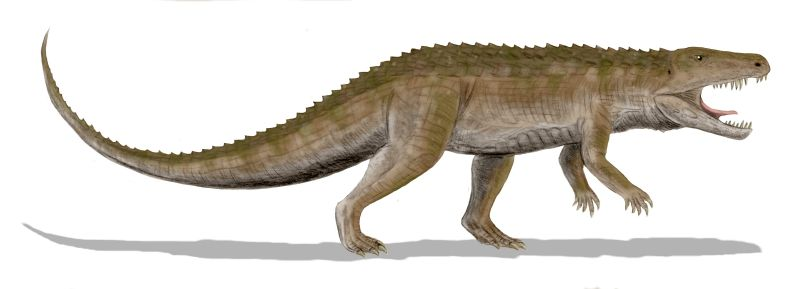
- Life restoration of Ornithosuchus woodwardi, a pseudosuchian archosaur

Scientific classification
- Kingdom: Animalia
- Phylum: Chordata
- Class: Reptilia
- Clade: Eucrocopoda
- Clade: Crurotarsi; Sereno & Arcucci, 1990

Subgroups
- †Omosaurus; †Phytosauria; Archosauria; Avemetatarsalia; Pseudosuchia

= Crurotarsi =

Crurotarsans Temporal range: Early Triassic–Present, 248–0 Ma

Clade of reptiles

Crurotarsi is a clade of archosauriform reptiles that includes crocodilians and stem-crocodilians and possibly bird-line archosaurs too if the extinct, crocodile-like phytosaurs are more distantly related to crocodiles than traditionally thought. Prior to 2011, the group had invariably included only archosaurs closer to crocodilians than to birds and other dinosaurs. An equivalent term for the crocodilian side of the archosaur family tree is Pseudosuchia. This traditional definition of Crurotarsi assumed that phytosaurs were crown-group archosaurs and more closely related to crocodilians than to birds. However, a 2011 study argued that the phytosaur lineage evolved prior to the split between birds and crocodilians. This would mean that phytosaurs were not true archosaurs, and therefore could not be considered representatives of croc-line archosaurs.

The name Crurotarsi is derived from the Latin word crus (lower leg) and the Greek word tarsos (ankle). It refers to the specialized articulation (a crurotarsal joint) between the lower leg (specifically the fibula) and the ankle (specifically the calcaneum) which is present in the skeletons of reptiles such as suchians and phytosaurs. In their ankle joint, a hemicylindrical condyle on the calcaneum articulates into a concave area on the fibula.

== Taxonomic history ==
The name Crurotarsi was erected as a node-based clade by Paul Sereno and A. B. Arcucci in 1990 to supplant the old term Pseudosuchia, but with a different definition. Crurotarsi includes, by most published definitions, all descendants of the common ancestor of modern crocodiles, ornithosuchids, aetosaurs, and phytosaurs; Nesbitt (2011) provided a shorter definition, defining Crurotarsi as "the least inclusive clade containing Rutiodon carolinensis Emmons, 1856, and Crocodylus niloticus Laurenti, 1768". According to two studies published in 2011 by Nesbitt and coworkers, using either of these definitions leads to the inclusion of all other true archosaurs in Crurotarsi, due to the possibly basal phylogenetic position of the phytosaurs. This means that grouping the phytosaurs and crocodilians into a clade while excluding the avemetatarsalians (pterosaurs, dinosaurs, and birds) would result in a paraphyletic grouping. A more definitive group is Pseudosuchia, which is defined as all archosaurs closer to crocodiles than to birds (matching the traditional content of Crurotarsi).

== Phylogeny ==
Paul Sereno and A. B. Arcucci named Crurotarsi in 1990, defining it as "Parasuchia [phytosaurs], Ornithosuchidae, Prestosuchus, Suchia, and all descendants of their common ancestor". The groups in this definition were considered crocodile-line archosaurs, as opposed to the bird-line archosaurs. Ornithosuchids were once considered bird-line archosaurs (as implied by their name, which means "bird crocodiles" in Greek), but were later recognized as crocodile-line archosaurs. This reclassification may have inspired Sereno's Crurotarsi, a node-based clade defined by the inclusion of ornithosuchids and other early archosaurs.

Two names were proposed for crocodile-line archosaurs before Crurotarsi was erected. The first, Pseudosuchia, was established as a stem-based clade in 1985. It includes crocodiles and all archosaurs more closely related to crocodiles than to birds. The second, Crocodylotarsi, was named in 1988, possibly as a replacement for Pseudosuchia. The name Pseudosuchia, meaning "false crocodiles", has been used for over a century, and traditionally included aetosaurs. As a clade, Pseudosuchia includes the group Eusuchia, or "true crocodiles". Crocodylotarsi may have been named to remove confusion, but as a stem-based clade it is synonymous with Pseudosuchia. Because Pseudosuchia was named first, it has precedence. Crurotarsi traditionally contains the same archosaurs as Pseudosuchia, but as a node-based clade it is not synonymous.

Below is a cladogram after Nesbitt & Norell (2006) and Nesbitt (2007) with Crurotarsi in its traditional sense encompassing just crocodile-line archosaurs:

- Archosauriformes
  - †Euparkeria
  - - †Proterochampsidae
    - Archosauria
      - to Avemetatarsalia
      - Crurotarsi
        - †Phytosauria
        - Suchia
          - †Aetosauria
          - - Crocodylomorpha
            - - †Ornithosuchidae
              - Rauisuchia
                - - †Rauisuchidae
                  - †Prestosuchidae
                - "Group X"
                  - †Arizonasaurus
                  - - †Lotosaurus
                    - "Group Y" or Shuvosaurinae
                      - †Sillosuchus
                      - - †Shuvosaurus
                        - †Effigia

Cladogram after Brusatte, Benton, Desojo and Langer (2010):

- Archosauriformes
  - †Erythrosuchus
  - - †Euparkeria
    - - †Proterochampsidae
      - Archosauria
        - to Avemetatarsalia
        - Crurotarsi
          - †Phytosauria
          - Suchia
            - - †Aetosauria
              - Paracrocodylomorpha
                - †Gracilisuchus
                - Bathyotica
                  - †Erpetosuchus
                  - Crocodylomorpha
            - - - †Revueltosaurus
                - †Ornithosuchidae
              - Rauisuchia
                - †Rauisuchoidea
                  - - Arganasuchus
                    - - Fasolasuchus
                      - - Stagonosuchus
                        - Ticinosuchus
                  - - Prestosuchidae
                      - Saurosuchus
                      - - Batrachotomus
                        - Prestosuchus
                    - Rauisuchidae
                      - Tikisuchus
                      - - Rauisuchus
                        - - Postosuchus
                          - Teratosaurus
                - †Poposauroidea
                  - Yarasuchus
                  - - Qianosuchus
                    - - Arizonasaurus
                      - Bromsgroveia
                      - Lotosaurus
                      - Poposaurus
                      - Sillosuchus
                      - Shuvosauridae
                        - Shuvosaurus
                        - Effigia

In 2011, Sterling J. Nesbitt found phytosaurs to be the sister taxon of Archosauria, and therefore not crocodile-line archosaurs. Because phytosaurs are included in the definition of Crurotarsi, this change in their phylogenetic placement expanded the scope of Crurotarsi, which therefore now includes phytosaurs, crocodiles, pterosaurs and dinosaurs. However, Pseudosuchia still contains only crocodile-line archosaurs.

Below is a cladogram modified from Nesbitt (2011) showing the new changes:

- Archosauriformes
  - †Proterosuchidae
  - - †Erythrosuchidae
    - - †Vancleavea
      - - †Proterochampsia
        - - †Euparkeria
          - Crurotarsi
            - †Phytosauria
            - Archosauria
              - Avemetatarsalia (bird-line archosaurs)
              - Pseudosuchia (crocodile-line archosaurs)
                - †Ornithosuchidae
                - Suchia
