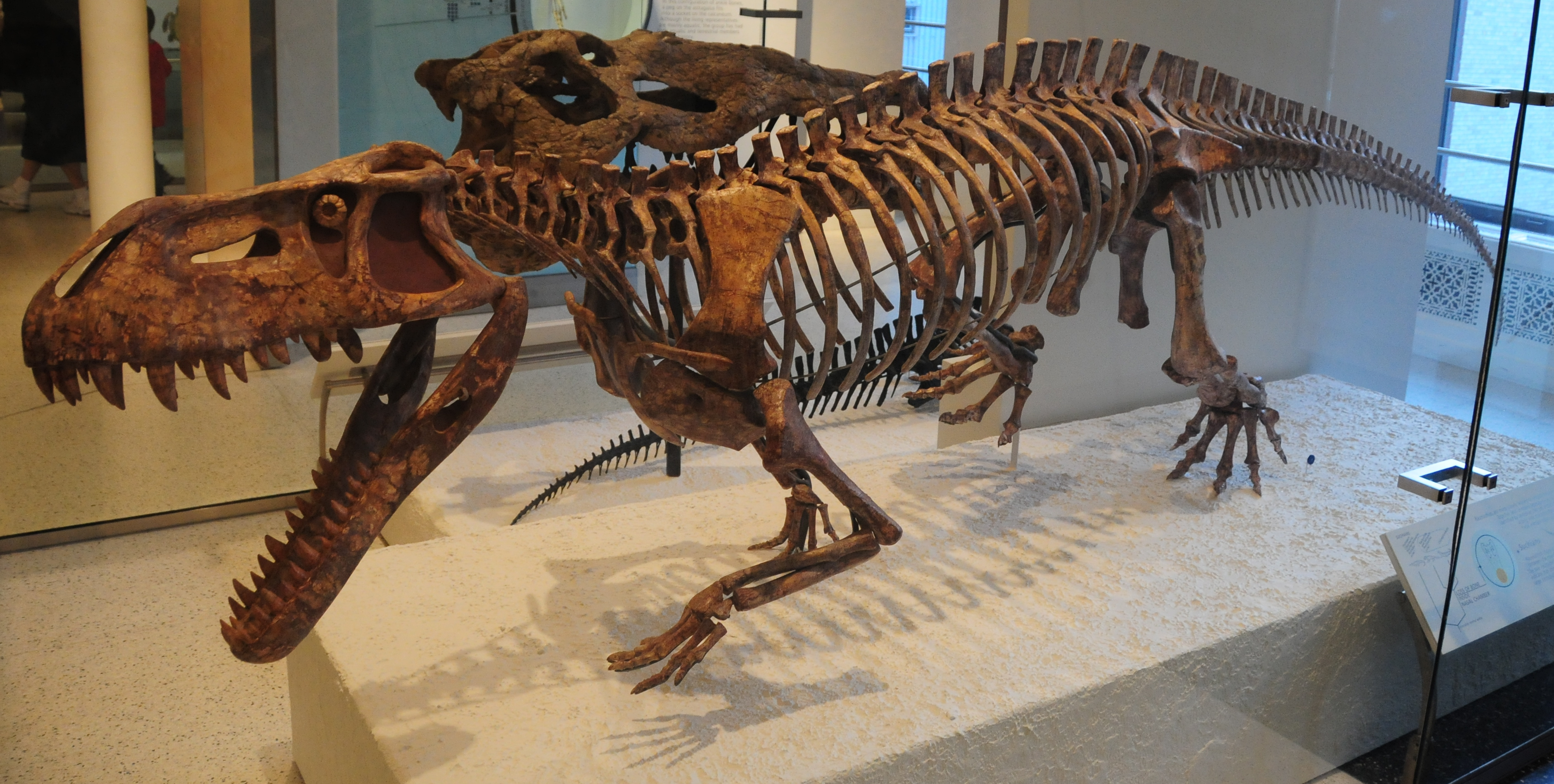
- AMNH 3856, a replica skeletal mount of Prestosuchus chiniquensis displayed at the American Museum of Natural History
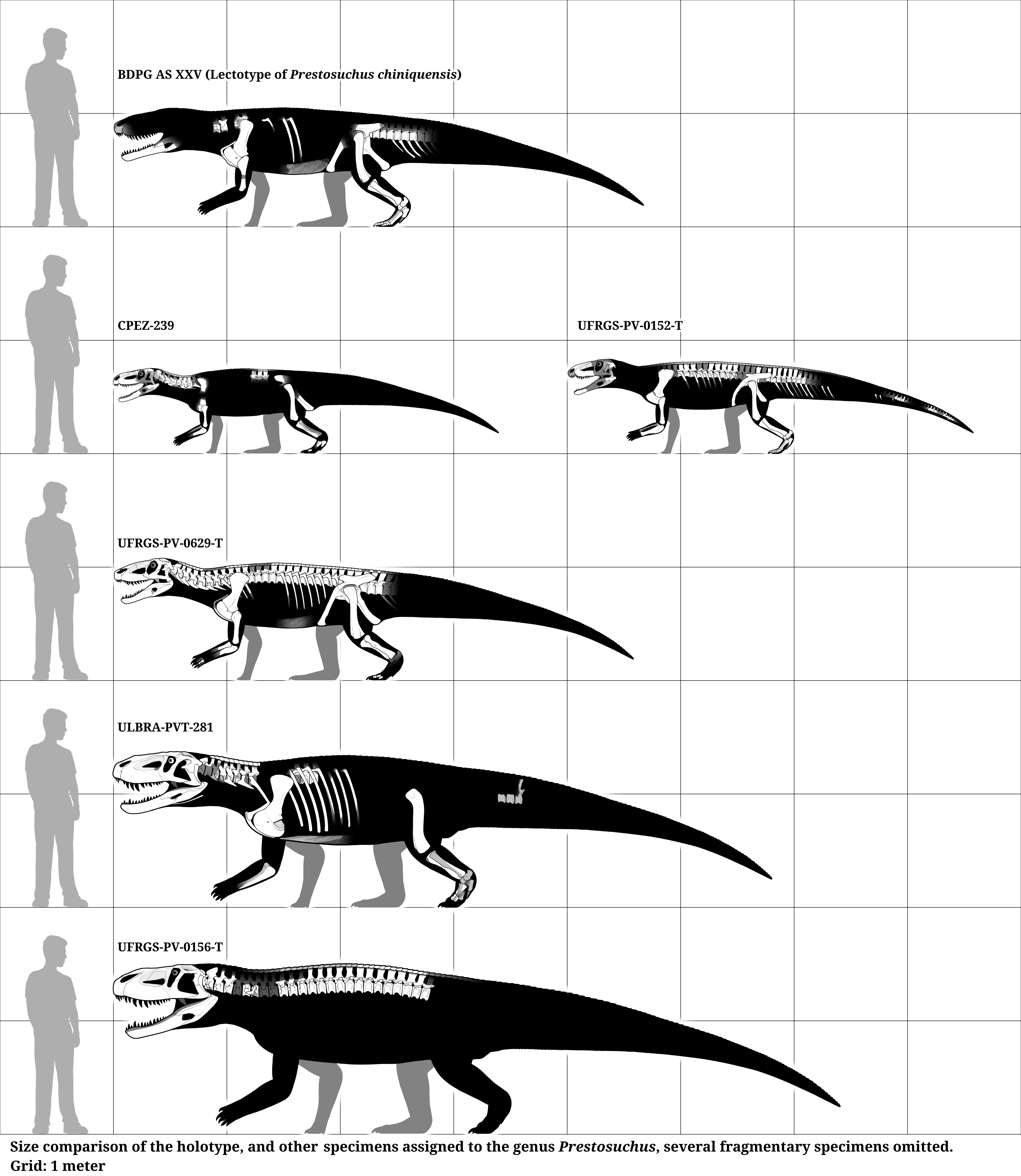
- Skeletal reconstruction and size comparison of several specimens assigned to Prestosuchus

Scientific classification
- Kingdom: Animalia
- Phylum: Chordata
- Class: Reptilia
- Clade: Pseudosuchia
- Clade: Loricata
- Family: †Prestosuchidae
- Genus: †Prestosuchus; Krebs, 1976

Type species
- †Prestosuchus chiniquensis Krebs, 1976

Other species
- †P. nyassicus? (von Huene, 1939)

Synonyms
- "Karamuru vorax"? (nomen nudum) Kischlat, 2000; Huenesuchus Kischlat, 2023; Stagonosuchus? von Huene, 1939

= Prestosuchus =

Prestosuchus Temporal range: Middle Triassic (Ladinian), 242–235 Ma

Extinct genus of reptiles

Prestosuchus (meaning "Prestes' crocodile") is an extinct genus of pseudosuchian in the group Loricata, from the Middle Triassic of Brazil. Prestosuchus is one of the largest and most extensively described early loricatans, known from many specimens including partial skeletons and enormous skulls. All undisputed Prestosuchus fossils are from the lower Santa Maria Formation (Dinodontosaurus assemblage zone) of Rio Grande do Sul, Brazil.

The type species, Prestosuchus chiniquensis, was originally named by Friedrich von Huene in 1938, though its original fossils were rather fragmentary compared to later finds. There has been some debate over exactly how many species are contained within Prestosuchus. Some purported Prestosuchus species are at other times regarded as unrelated pseudosuchians, such as Procerosuchus, Schultzsuchus ("Prestosuchus loricatus"), and Stagonosuchus ("Prestosuchus nyassicus").

Alongside relatives such as Saurosuchus and Postosuchus, Prestosuchus has historically been referred to as a "rauisuchian", as well as the defining member of the family Prestosuchidae. The validity of both of these groups is questionable. "Rauisuchia" is now considered a paraphyletic group of large carnivorous pseudosuchians ancestral to crocodylomorphs. Prestosuchidae is polyphyletic in its widest form, though it may retain some utility in a narrower sense centered on Prestosuchus.

== History of study ==
=== Munich specimens ===
The holotype of Prestosuchus chiniquensis was discovered by Wilhelm Rau alongside the holotype of Rauisuchus tiradentes. Both were found in 1928 or 1929 within the Santa Maria Formation at Paleontological Site Chiniquá, near the city of São Pedro do Sul in Rio Grande do Sul, Brazil. The fossils were shipped back to Germany for study by the German paleontologist Friedrich von Huene. Von Huene named the genus Prestosuchus in 1938 in honor of Brazilian paleontologist Vicentino Prestes de Almeida. The Chiniquá site is now part of the geopark of Paleorrota.

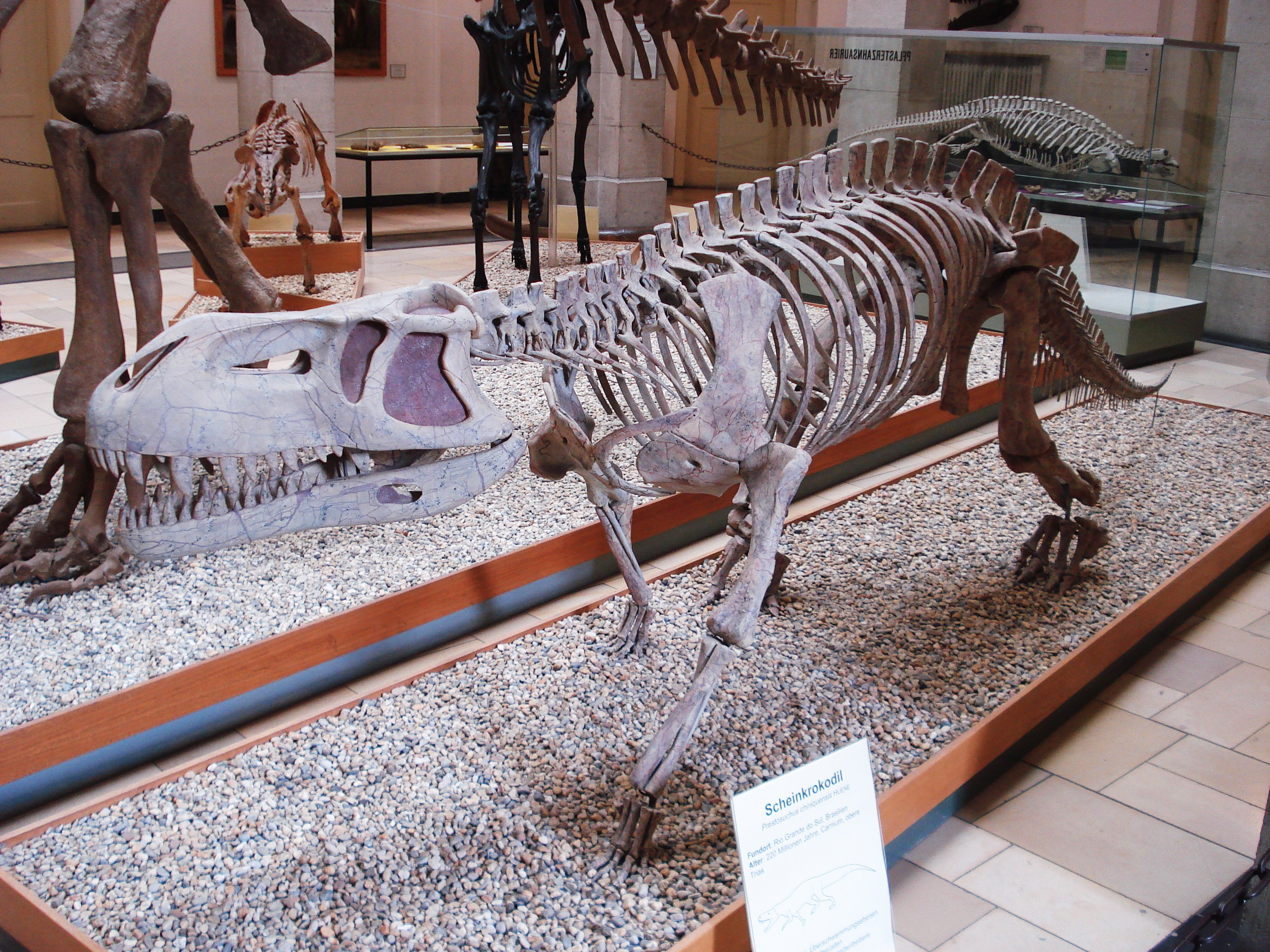
Replica skeletal mount of Prestosuchus chiniquensis on display at the Palaeontological Museum in Munich, Germany, where its original fossils are now stored.

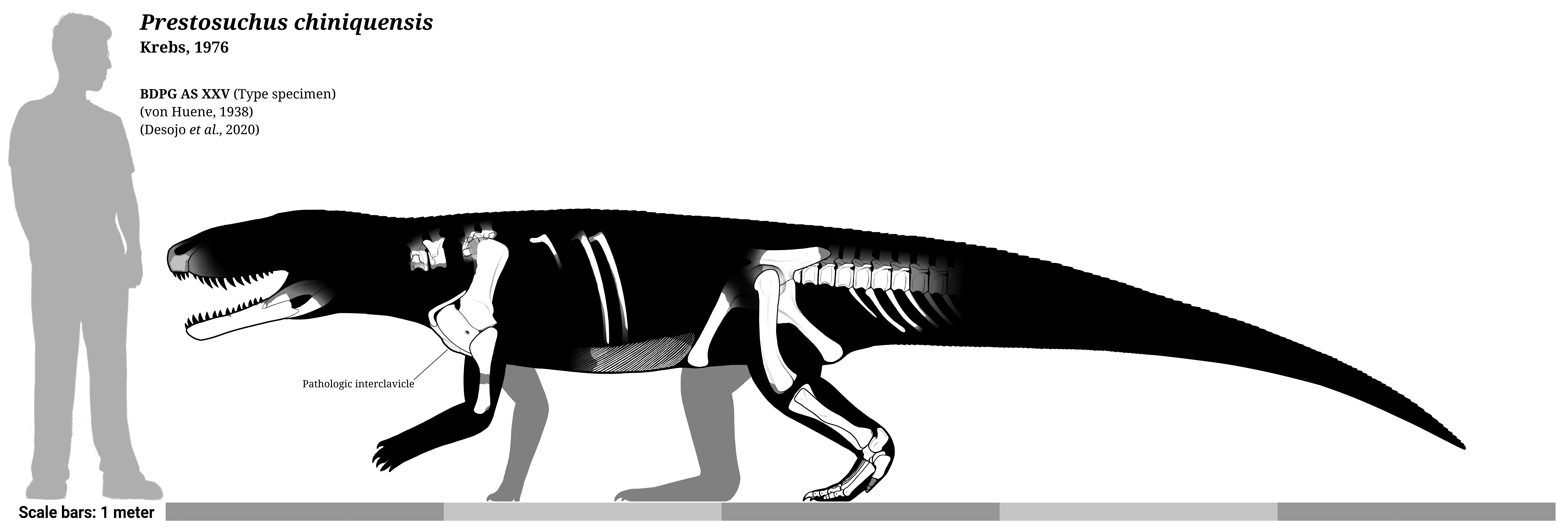
Skeletal reconstruction based on the Munich specimens of Prestosuchus chiniquensis

Von Huene (1938) recognized two specimens of Prestosuchus chiniquensis from the Chiniquá area. One specimen was a partial skeleton including a jaw and snout fragments, and its bones were labelled SNSB-BSPG AS XXV 1-3, 5-11, 28-41, and 49. In 1972, this specimen was designated as the lectotype of Prestosuchus chiniquensis. The other specimen, SNSB-BSPG AS XXV 7, consists of the upper part of the hip and sacrum. It was designated as the paralectotype of the species.

The lectotype and paralectotype are stored at the Bavarian State Collection for Palaeontology and Geology (Bayerische Staatsammlung für Paläontologie und Geologie, BSPG) institute of the Bavarian Natural History Collections (Staatliche Naturwissenschaftliche Sammlungen Bayerns, or SNSB) in Munich, Germany. Both have been redescribed by Desojo et al. (2020).

Huene named several more Prestosuchus-like reptiles shortly afterwards, although he did not consider them to be the same species as Prestosuchus chiniquensis. One specimen, with its fossils labelled as SNSB-BSPG AS XXV 131-139, received its own genus and species: Procerosuchus celer. Another specimen, with its fossils labelled SNSB-BSPG AS XXV 13–24, 26–27, and 44–48, was designated as a second species of Prestosuchus, Prestosuchus loricatus.

Some authors have considered Procerosuchus celer or Prestosuchus loricatus to be junior synonyms of Prestosuchus chiniquensis. Others have gone as far as to consider not only Procerosuchus celer a separate genus, but also "Prestosuchus" loricatus. Desojo & Rauhut (2024) established the new genus Schultzsuchus for "Prestosuchus" loricatus, as their analyses disputed a close relationship to Prestosuchus chiniquensis.

=== Porto Alegre specimens ===
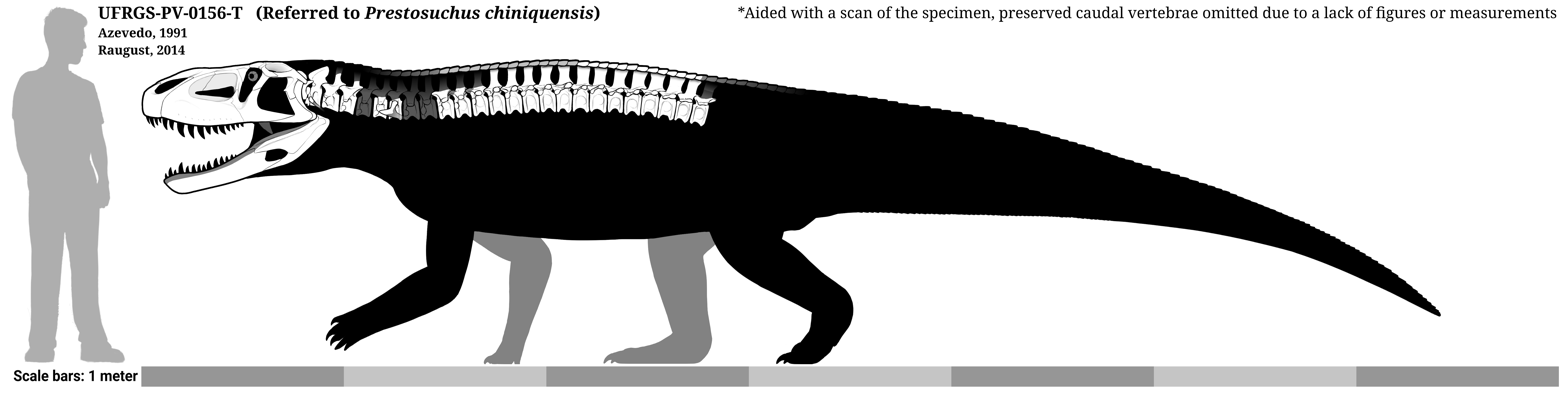
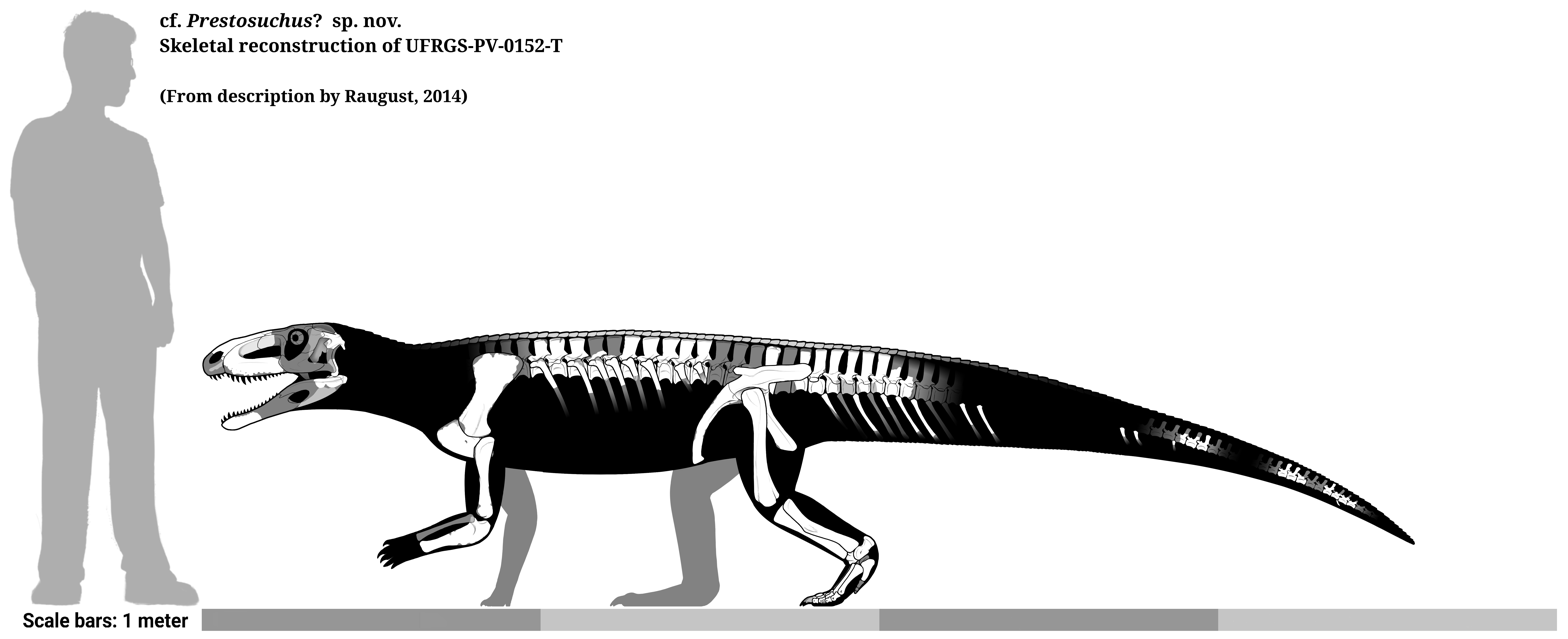
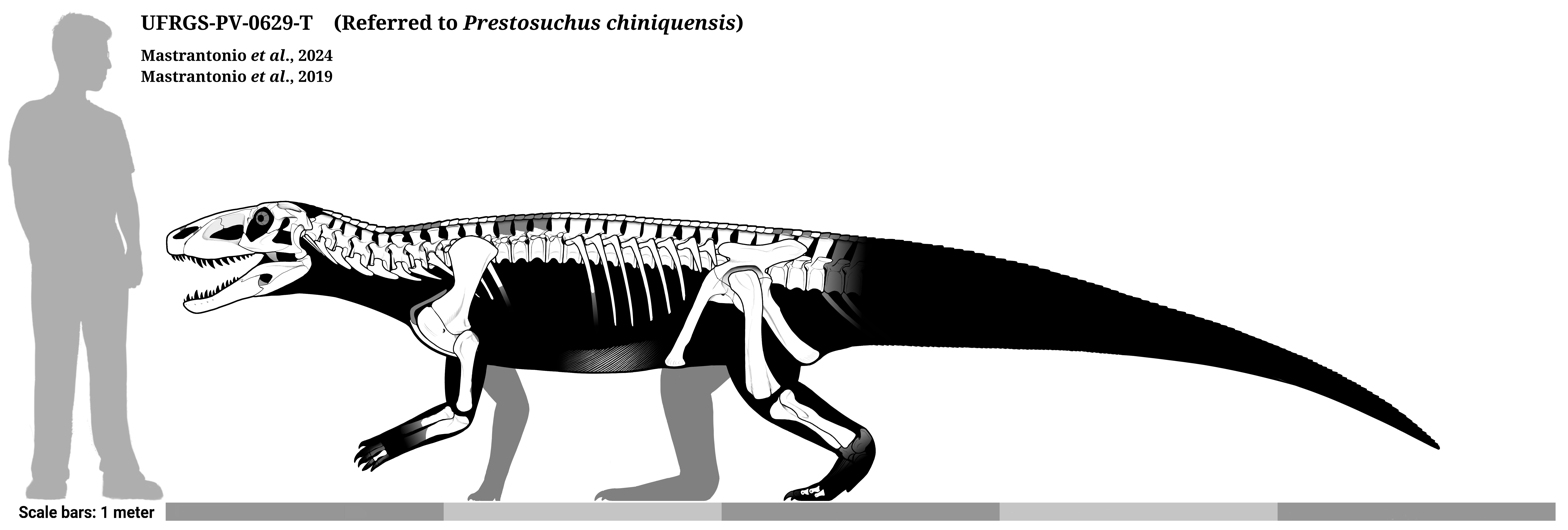
Three Porto Alegre specimens, from top to bottom: UFRGS-PV-0156-T, UFRGS-PV-0152-T, and UFRGS-PV-0629-T

Four Prestosuchus specimens are stored at the Universidade Federal do Rio Grande do Sul (UFRGS) in Porto Alegre. The first to be described was UFRGS-PV-0156-T, a massive and well-preserved skull discovered along with most of a vertebral column at the Pascual Sanga outcrop in Candelária. It was originally described by Barberena (1978) and has experienced much discussion as to its relations to the original Munich specimens. A more complete partial skeleton from Vale Verde, UFRGS-PV-0152-T, was studied by Nesbitt (2011) along with the Munich lectotype and UFRGS-PV-0156-T. It is anatomically similar to the latter specimen.

The most complete UFRGS specimen is UFRGS-PV-0629-T, a partial skeleton from Dona Francisca which was originally described in a thesis by Mastrantonio (2010). This specimen has been the subject of braincase (2013), skull (2019), and postcranial (2024) descriptions, as well as hip muscle reconstructions. The least complete UFRGS specimen is UFRGS-PV-0473-T, an isolated braincase which may be from the "Posto de Gasolina" outcrop in Dona Francisca.

Porto Alegre has one additional Prestosuchus specimen unaffiliated with the UFRGS: MCP-146, a portion of the hip area stored at the Museu de Ciências e Tecnologia of Pontífícia Universidade do Rio Grande do Sul.

=== Other specimens ===
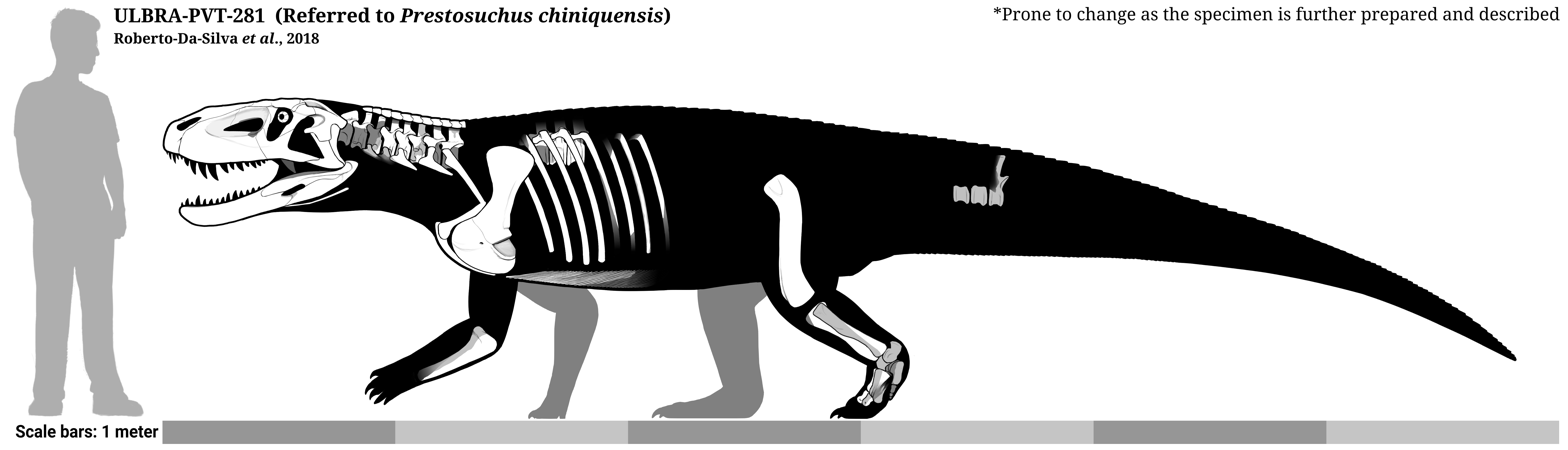
ULBRA-PVT-281

Various other museums have their own Prestosuchus specimens. One of the most spectacular specimens, ULBRA-PVT-281, consists of a very large and complete skull and partial skeleton discovered at "Posto de Gasolina" and now stored at the Universidade Luterana do Brasil (ULBRA) in Canoas. This specimen was discovered in 2010 and was fully described by Roberto-Da-Silva et al. (2018/2019)

The Museu Paleontológico e Arqueológico Walter Ilha in São Pedro do Sul has a selection of Prestosuchus fossils collectively termed CPEZ-239b. CPEZ-239b corresponds to at least two juvenile individuals found at the Baum (Tree) Sanga outcrop, which were described by Lacerda et al. (2016).

The only Prestosuchus fossil stored outside of Brazil or Germany is MCZ 4167, an obscure and fragmentary specimen found at "Posto de Gasolina" and held at Harvard's Museum of Comparative Zoology in Cambridge, Massachusetts.

=== Taxonomic controversies ===
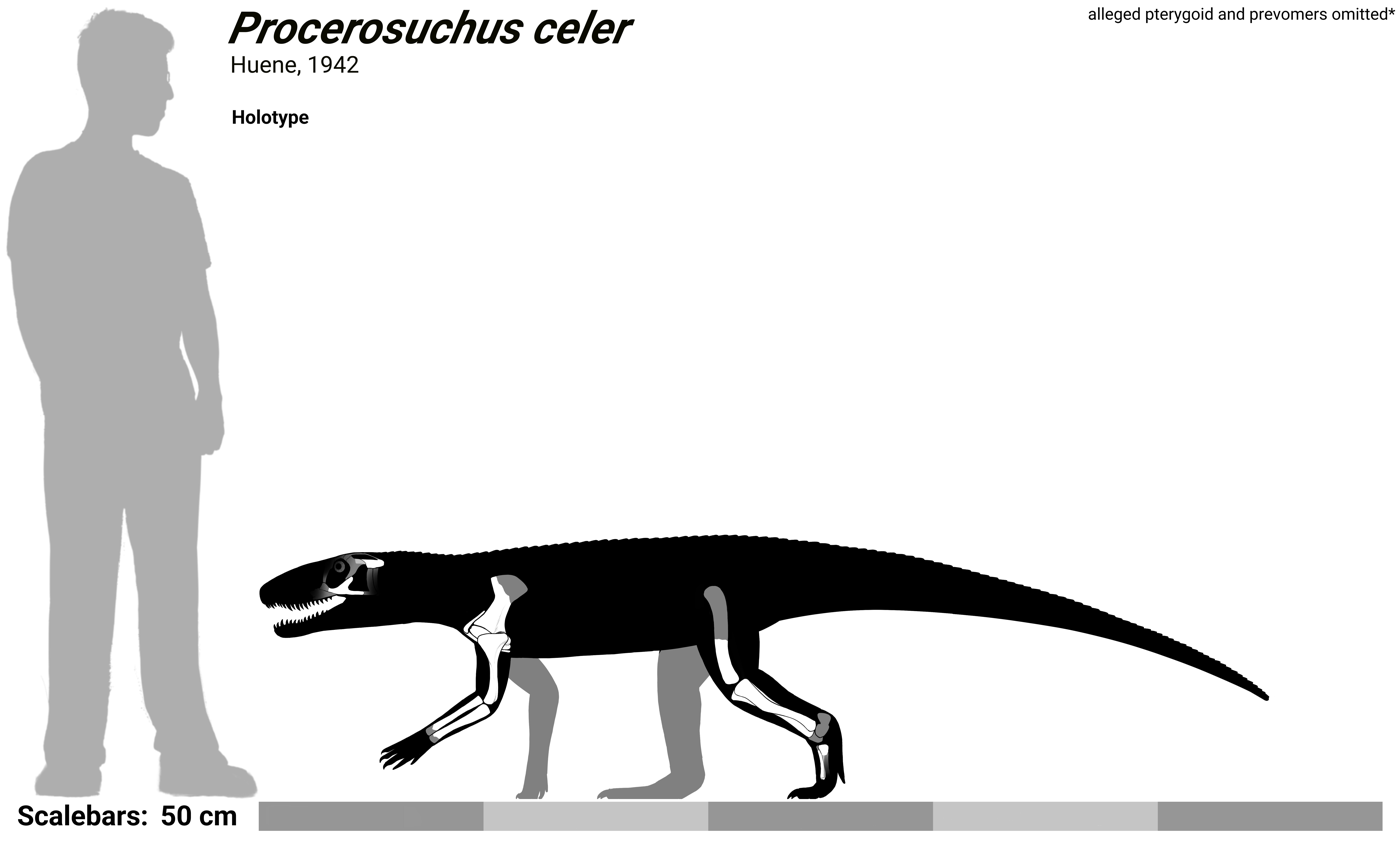
Procerosuchus celer, a small rauisuchian sometimes considered a specimen of Prestosuchus but more commonly treated as valid.

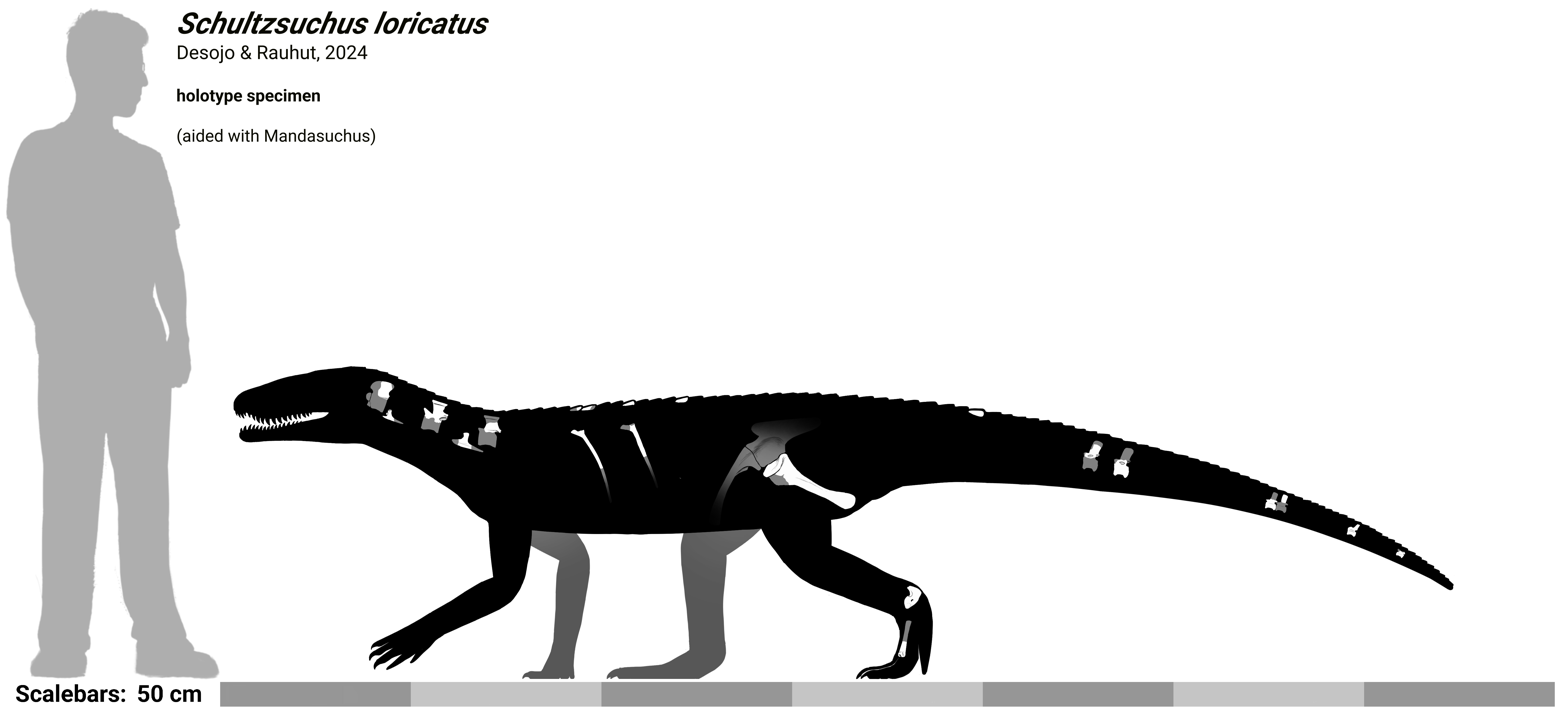
The poposauroid Schultzsuchus loricatus, previously considered a species of Prestosuchus

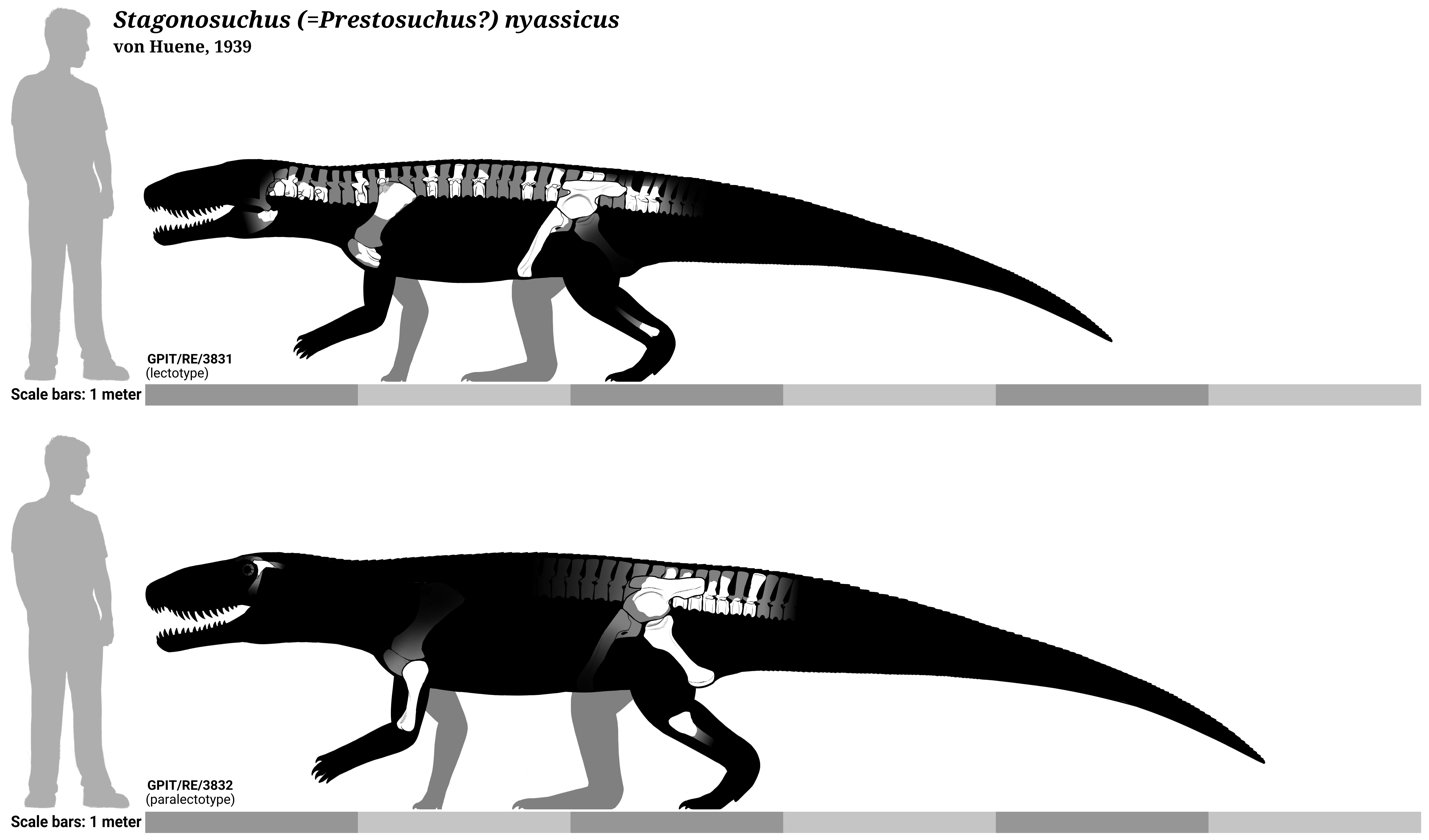
Stagonosuchus nyassicus, a large pseudosuchian from Tanzania.

Prestosuchus has been the subject of constant dialogue over the taxonomy of its fossils. Many names have been proposed for the various fossils referred to Prestosuchus and its one or more constituent species. Some of these names are informal proposals rejected by the academic community, while others have been formally published in peer-reviewed studies.

A brief abstract by Kischlat & Barberena (1999) claimed that several Prestosuchus specimens, including the paralectotype of P. chiniquensis and the giant "Porto Alegre specimen" (i.e. UFRGS-PV-0156-T), actually deserve a new genus and species. Kischlat (2000) later used the name "Karamuru vorax" in reference to these fossils, citing the 1999 abstract as the name's origin. This is despite the fact that his 2000 study is the first explicit use of the name in any publication. In a section heading within the same 2000 study, Kischlat referred to "Prestosuchus" loricatus as "Abaporu" loricatus. At no point does Kischlat assign type material to these proposed names.

These informal treatments do not pass ICZN standards for new scientific names, so "Karamuru vorax" and "Abaporu" are considered invalid nomina nuda by the wider community. Later, Kischlat (2023) proposed that Prestosuchus chiniquensis should receive a new genus name, Huenesuchus. Although Kischlat admitted that Prestosuchus is a valid name, he preferred to replace that name under the argument that a single type species was not explicitly established by von Huene along ICZN guidelines. Other paleontologists immediately disagreed with Kischlat's arguments in informal contexts.

Publications relevant to Prestosuchus, starting with Kuhn (1961), have consistently treated P. chiniquensis as a valid type species. McDavid (2025) formally discussed the issue, citing Prestosuchus as the proper generic name since it had been diagnosed by Oskar Kuhn in 1961. Another publication, by Pêgas, Bandeira & Silva (2025), noted that Kuhn (1961) provided references to purported descriptions of the genus in Huene (1942) and Hoffstetter (1955). Pêgas and colleagues argued that these works (and, as a consequence, Kuhn's publication as well) lack any sort of statement of "characters that are purported to differentiate the taxon" that would fulfill the criteria from the Article 13.1. of ICZN. Instead, the authors pointed to Krebs (1976) as the publication fulfilling the criteria of the Code and making the name Prestosuchus nomenclaturally available. In any case, multiple research teams dispute Kischlat's attempts to establish alternative names for fossils typically referred to Prestosuchus.

A 2008 abstract by Desojo & Rauhut argued that Procerosuchus celer was a junior synonym of Prestosuchus chiniquensis. Later studies, many of which include the same authors, disagree with this preliminary finding. Desojo et al. (2020) indicated that "Prestosuchus" loricatus deserved its own genus, and that a new name was forthcoming. Desojo & Rauhut (2024) redescribed the remains of "Prestosuchus" loricatus and determined that it was a valid species of poposauroid, not closely related to Prestosuchus chiniquensis. In accordance with this finding, they placed "Prestosuchus" loricatus into a new genus, Schultzsuchus, named after Cesar Schultz.

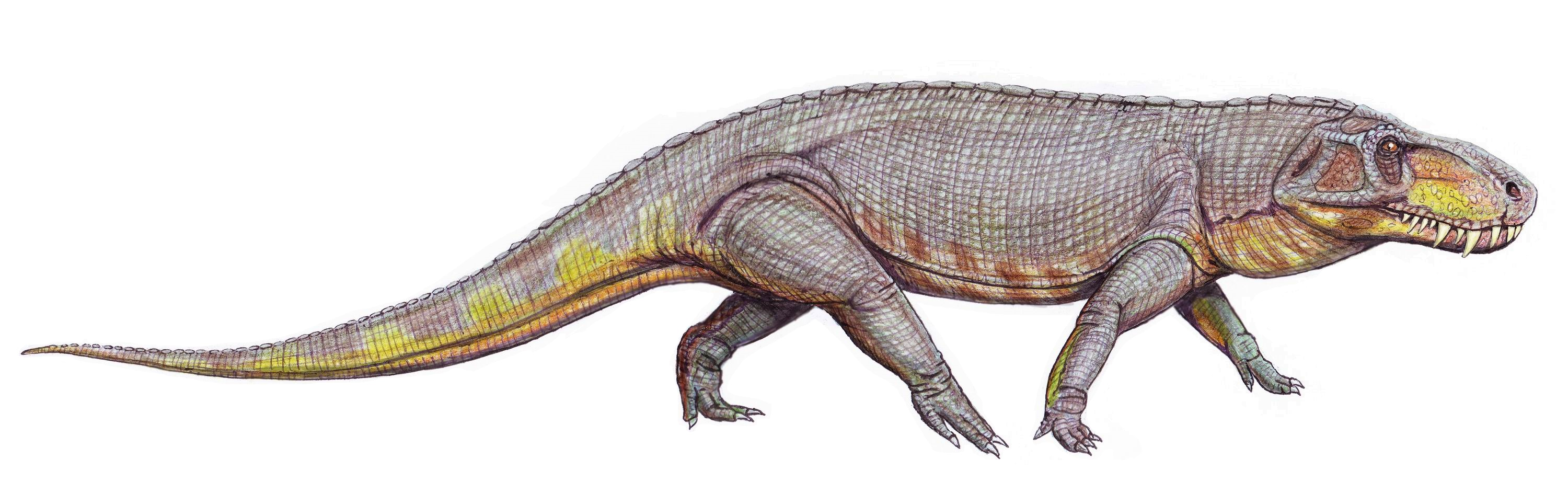
Life restoration of Prestosuchus chiniquensis

Stagonosuchus nyassicus is a possible loricatan known from two specimens discovered in the Manda Beds of Tanzania. It was originally named and described by von Huene (1938/1939), though it remained obscure for decades. Desojo et al. (2020) argued that it should be lumped into Prestosuchus as a second valid species, Prestosuchus nyassicus. However, a study from the same year did not recover the two species as sister taxa. A phylogenetic analysis by Smith et al. (2024) recovered Stagonosuchus outside Loricata and suggested that it could be included within Poposauroidea instead.

== Description ==
Like its relatives, Prestosuchus had a deep skull and serrated teeth. While it resembled a dinosaur in having a large body and upright posture, it was actually a pseudosuchian, meaning that it was an archosaur more closely related to modern crocodilians than to dinosaurs. Prestosuchus lived during the Middle Triassic in what is now Brazil. Initially it was estimated to be around 5 meters (17 feet) but a specimen discovered in 2010 suggest that Prestosuchus reached lengths of nearly 7 meters (23 feet) making it one of the largest Triassic pseudosuchians alongside Saurosuchus and Fasolasuchus. Prestosuchus probably walked on four legs like crocodilians, but unlike crocodilians, it had an upright semi-erect stance with limb bones placed below the hips.

=== Skull ===
STL 3D model of the skull of referred Prestosuchus specimen UFRGS-PV-0156-T.

The premaxilla has a tall and boxy main body with four teeth. The premaxilla also has several slender branches: a bent anterodorsal process (front upper branch), a long maxillary process (outer rear branch), and well as a pronounced palatal process (inner rear branch). These define a triangular naris (nostril hole) similar to Saurosuchus but very distinct from that of Batrachotomus. The maxilla is deep and roughly textured, with a low, triangular antorbital fenestra and 11-13 large teeth. Many specimens seemingly possessed a thin convex ridge ("roman nose") running along the midline of the elongated and narrow nasals, similar to Luperosuchus and Batrachotomus. However, some paleontologists have argued that this appearance is a result of distortion. Additional low, rough lateral ridges (similar to those of Rauisuchus) run along the upper edge of the snout from the nasal to the lacrimal and prefrontal. A palpebral bone is present above the orbit in the largest specimens but is absent in other skulls. Unlike Postosuchus and Luperosuchus, which have their palpebral forming the entire upper edge of their orbit, Prestosuchus has additional bones forming part of the upper edge; the postfrontal always participates in the orbit, and smaller specimens without a palpebral have the frontal contribute as well.

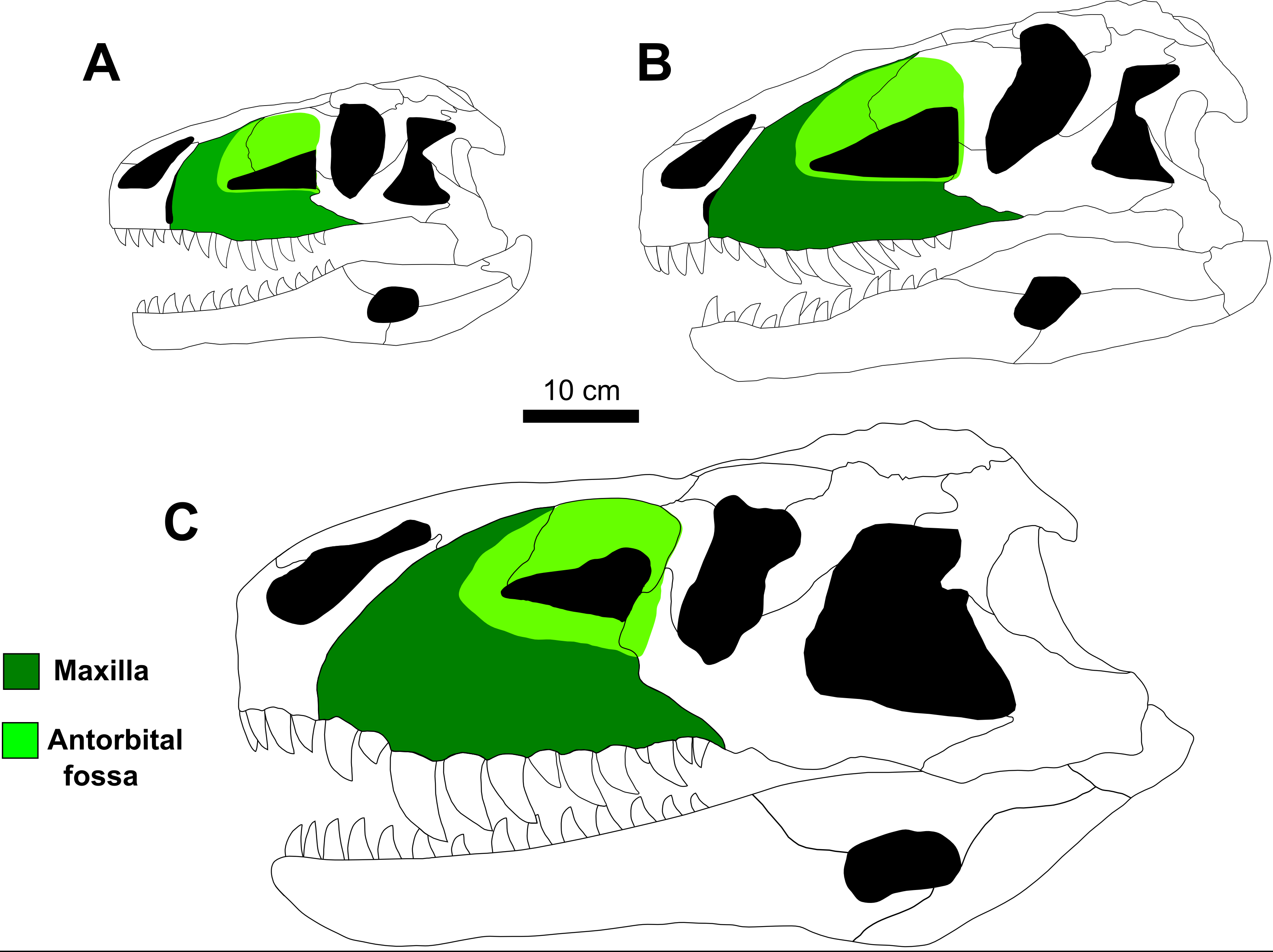
Prestosuchus skulls of various ages: A, CPEZ-239b; B, UFRGS-PV-0629-T; C, UFRGS-PV-0156-T

Life portrait based on UFRGS-PV-0156-T

The orbit has an overall "keyhole" shape like many other loricatans, with its upper half having a smoother and wider border and its lower half being narrow and pointed. This shape is due to a slightly forward tilt of the lower branch of the postorbital, though the magnitude of this tilt is variable between specimens. The jugal is relatively smooth in texture and has extensive sutures with the maxilla, lacrimal, and postorbital, as well as the V-shaped quadratojugal. The squamosal is complex in shape, with a bulbous front branch that is circular in cross-section and a lower branch that infringes on the infratemporal fenestra. The tall and broad quadrate extends from a socket on the rear branch of the squamosal to below the level of the quadratojugal. It also sends forward two large plates of bone which connect with the pterygoid and quadratojugal.

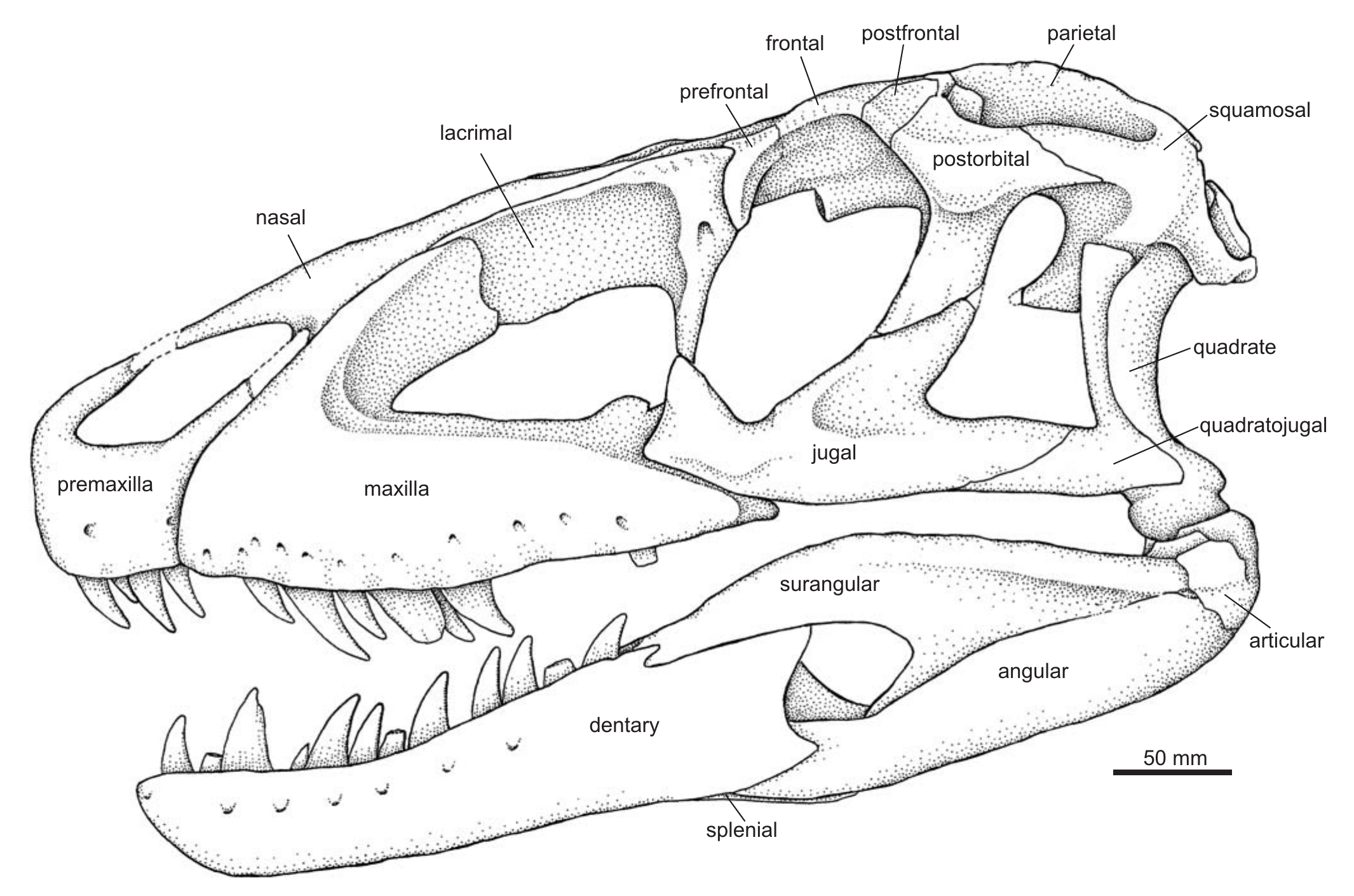
A labelled skull diagram of specimen UFRGS-PV-0629-T

The palate was solid, composed of flat and toothless bones. It incorporated long, slender vomers and rectangular palatines which extensively contact the rest of the skull. The pterygoids are standard for loricatans, with a long and plate-like front branch that curves upwards at its inner edge, a thicker laterally branch which curves down, and a two-pronged connection to the quadrate. The pterygoid was also connected to the jugal via a very thick, Y-shaped ectopterygoid. Curved, rod-like hyoid bones were present as well.

The left and right lower jaws are relatively long and loosely attached to each other at the symphysis (chin). There are 14 teeth in the dentary, the main tooth-bearing bone of the lower jaw. This bone has a straight or slightly convex lower edge and expands upwards at the chin, unlike Saurosuchus. The splenial, which lies on the inner surface of the dentary, is unusually elongated in Prestosuchus and extends as far forward as the second tooth in the jaw. The rear of the dentary has a shallow incision which defines the front edge of the rounded mandibular fenestra. The lower edge of the mandibular fenestra is mainly bound by the angular, while the surangular forms its upper border. Bones at the rear of the lower jaw have proportions and structures similar to other loricatans. Such structures include a shelf at the rear of the surangular and a thick articular bone which has a tall retroarticular process with an inner prong pierced by a chorda tympani foramen.

=== Vertebrae ===
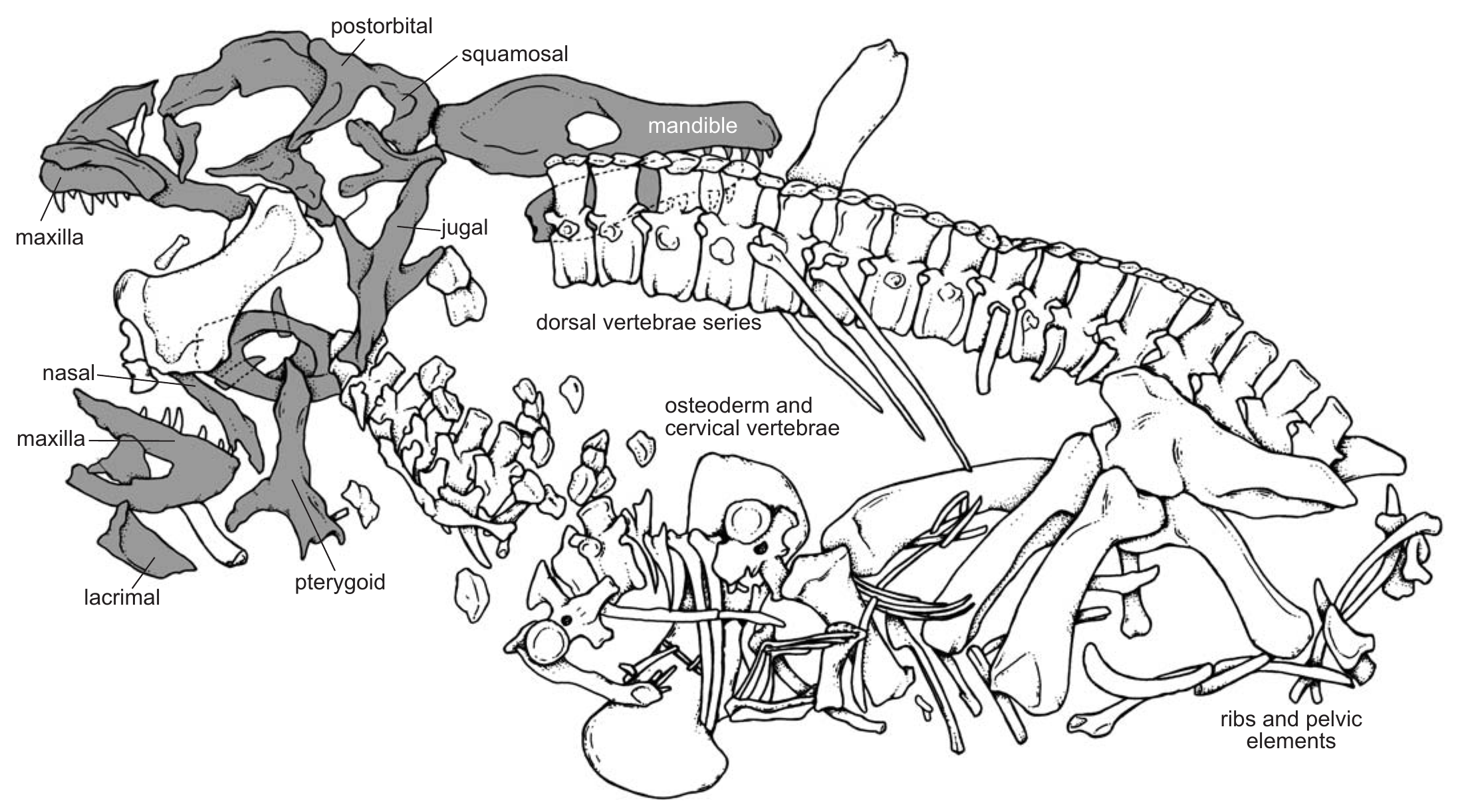
A diagram of specimen UFRGS-PV-0629-T

Cervical (neck) vertebrae are notably tall and their sides are excavated by large ventral depressions, which generates a keel on their lower edge. Many laminae (bony buttresses) are developed on the centrum (main spool-shaped portion of the vertebra). Most of these connect the diapophysis (upper rib facet) to the parapophysis (lower rib facet), zygapophyses (articular processes), and the main body of the centrum. Thin laminae also connect the zygapophyses to the centrum and one lamina projects backwards from the parapophysis in one cervical. A deep lateral depression is developed between the rib facets, along with triangular depressions between the diapophysis and zygapophyses. The neural spines are tall and expand to the side at their tip, forming structures known as spine tables. Cervical ribs connected to their respective vertebrae through two wide facets ("heads"). The dorsal vertebrae are generally similar to the cervicals in terms of their laminae, depressions, and expanded spine tables. They primarily differ in their lengthier transverse processes, and a lack of a ventral keel. Dorsal vertebrae further towards the hip have the parapophyses shift close to the diapophyses, fusing or eliminating some of the features they exhibit. However, in dorsal vertebrae close to the neck, the rear centro-diapophyseal lamina is very thick and an additional lamina is present in the depression between the diapophyses and prezygapophysis. Prestosuchus also possessed two-headed dorsal ribs which were similar in shape to those of Batrachotomus, as well as a dense gastral basket.

There are two sacral vertebrae, and it is unclear whether they are fused to each other. The zygapophyses are stout while the neural spines are taller though less expanded than those of the cervicals and dorsals. The sacral ribs are fan-shaped when seen from above; the first rib overlaps the second, which expands further rearwards. Only a few caudal (tail) vertebrae are known in Prestosuchus as a whole. Anterior caudals (those at the base of the tail) are higher than long and have tall neural spines that are slightly expanded at their tip. The first caudal of the lectotype specimen and P. nyassicus have a ventral keel and lateral depressions, but other specimens lack these features. From the third caudal onward, rod-like chevrons are developed. Towards the tip of the tail the caudals become low, elongated, and simple. Osteoderms (bony plates) were present in two rows along the neck and back and one row along the tail. Individual osteoderms were wide, roughly heart-shaped, and more than one osteoderm per row was present above each vertebra.

=== Pectoral girdle and forelimbs ===
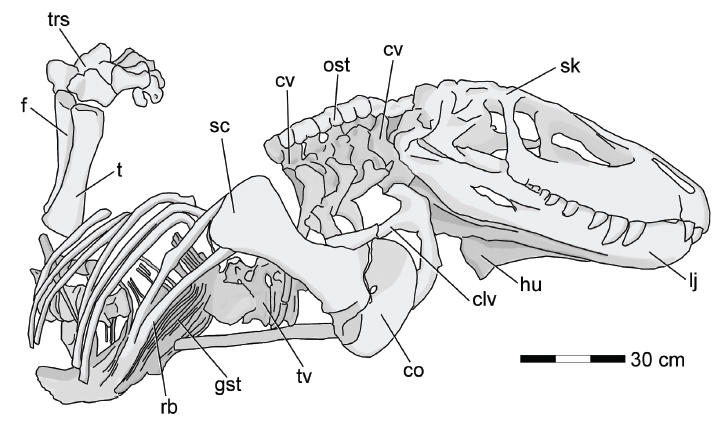
A diagram of specimen ULBRA-PVT-281

The scapula and coracoid are strongly connected to each other but not fused. The scapula when seen from the side narrows at midshaft and expands upwards, though these changes are not as abrupt as in other loricatans. Above the glenoid (shoulder socket) is a prominent roughened area for the triceps muscle. The lower front portion of the scapula has a large acromion, which is unusually hook-shaped in the type specimen of P. chiniquensis due to an oval notch on its upper edge. A low notch is also present at the front edge of the scapula-coracoid suture in most Prestosuchus specimens. This notch has not been reported in any other loricatan and some have considered it an autapomorphy (unique distinguishing feature) of Prestosuchus. The coracoid is low, about twice as long as it is high. Its rear edge has a large contribution to the glenoid, which is preceded by a coracoid foramen and then a horizontal ridge. The horizontal ridge may be an autapomorphy of P. chiniquensis, yet it has also been reported in Procerosuchus and Batrachotomus. The rod-like clavicles have a tall vertical portion which connects to the front of the scapula and a shorter horizontal portion at their base which connects to the tie-shaped interclavicle.

The humerus is thick and about two-thirds to three-fourths the length of the femur. It is flattened and very wide near the shoulder, as well as somewhat expanded near the elbow. Bony joints (such as the two distal condyles) and muscle scars (such as the deltopectoral crest) are well-developed. The ulna and radius are thinner but no less strongly developed, with the former having a large olecranon process and the latter having a conical medial process. The hand is a mostly unknown anatomical area in Prestosuchus; only a single metacarpal has been discovered and it is widest towards the wrist. The forelimbs as a whole are similar in structure (though not necessarily proportions) to those of other loricatans like Postosuchus.

=== Hip and hindlimbs ===
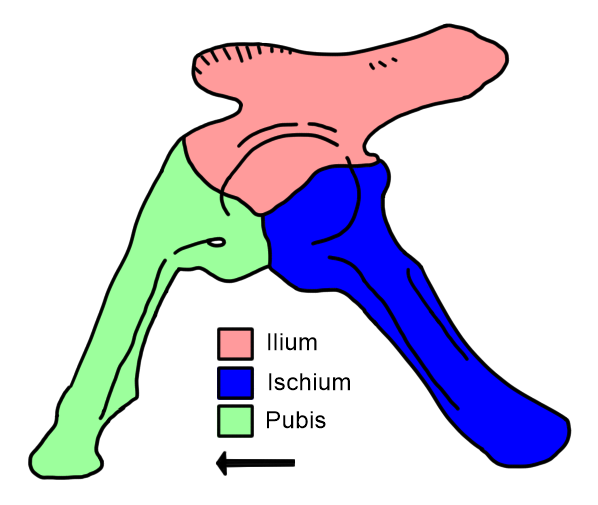
Hip diagram of Prestosuchus chiniquensis

Several autapomorphies of Prestosuchus relate to the pelvis (hip). These traits are present in P. chiniquensis and P. nyassicus (Stagonosuchus), but notably absent in "P." loricatus, which is likely a different genus. The ilium has a deep bony acetabulum roofed by a horizontal supraacetabular crest. Unlike other loricatans, there is no vertical crest above the acetabular region. The postacetabular portion of the ilium has a distinctively concave upper edge and is markedly longer than the preacetabular portion. The pubis is straight, with a small contribution to the acetabulum above the obturator foramen. The tip of the shaft expands into a knob-like pubic boot like other loricatans, though it is much smaller than that of relatives such as Saurosuchus and Postosuchus.

Like the ilium, the ischium is another bone which is distinctive in Prestosuchus. It is thicker than the pubis and makes a larger contribution to the acetabulum. Prominent crests are developed along the dorsal (upper) and ventral (lower) edges of the ischium. A large midline ventral crest is only seen in P. chiniquensis, P. nyassicus, and Batrachotomus among loricatans. However, Batrachotomus's crest smoothly transitions from the base of the ischium to the shaft, whereas an abrupt angled incision is observed in this area for P. chiniquensis and P. nyassicus. The paired dorsal ridges are autapomorphies of Prestosuchus, though they extend further down the shaft in P. chiniquensis than P. nyassicus. They are edged by long depressions and separated by a shallow groove on the midline of the ischium, where the left and right ischia have fused. As with other loricatans, the tip of the ischial shaft is slightly expanded into an ischial boot.

The femur is very robust, without a clear neck leading from the shaft of the bone to the head. The fourth trochanter manifests as a low, rough area rather than the pronounced knob or ridge present in most other archosaurs. With the exception of having a tapering (rather than rounded) medial condyle, Prestosuchus generally resembles other loricatans in the structure of the femoral head and distal condyles. The tibia is shorter than the femur but thick and expanded near the knee. A deep pit is present on the postero-medial portion of its upper expansion, as also observed in Procerosuchus and Batrachotomus. The fibula is much more slender, developing a large knob-like iliofibularis muscle scar as in various other pseudosuchians. Near the heel, a deep depression is present on the rear of the fibula. This depression is an autapomorphy of Prestosuchus, being lunate (crescent-shaped) in P. chiniquensis and elongated in P. nyassicus.

Prestosuchus has a "crocodile-normal" crurotarsal ankle, with a convex-concave suture between the astragalus and calcaneum. The astragalus has a large tibial facet and small fibular facet on its upper surface, a curved depression on its front surface, and facets for distal tarsal III and metatarsals I-II on its lower surface. The calcaneum is wide and has a convex fibular knob and calcaneal tuber, as with other crurotarsal archosaurs. The calcaneal tuber is wider than long and has a tall boxy expansion at its rear. The underside of the calcaneum has a large facet for distal tarsal IV and metatarsals III-IV, followed by a teardrop-shaped depression. The two distal tarsals (III and IV) were roughly triangular. Metatarsal III is the longest bone in the foot, while the thick and hooked metatarsal V is the shortest, followed by metatarsal I. All the metatarsals had strongly developed ginglymoidal joints. I-III and V are triangular in cross-section, while IV is hourglass shaped. The foot has a phalangeal formula of 2-3-4-3-X, indicating that the fourth toe was much smaller than the second and third, an unusual trait among early loricatans. The first toe had a large curved claw, the third toe was thick, and the second toe had both traits.

== Classification ==
The cladogram below follows a simplified version of the strict reduced consensus tree by Desojo et al. (2020):

- Archosauria
  - Avemetatarsalia
  - Pseudosuchia
    - Ornithosuchidae
    - Suchia
      - - Revueltosaurus
        - Aetosauria
      - - Gracilisuchidae
        - - Ticinosuchus
          - Paracrocodylomorpha
            - Mandasuchus
            - Poposauroidea
            - Loricata
              - Pagosvenator
              - Prestosuchidae
                - Saurosuchus
                - Prestosuchus
              - - Batrachotomus
                - - Fasolasuchus
                  - - Rauisuchidae
                      - Rauisuchus
                      - - Polonosuchus
                        - Postosuchus
                    - Crocodylomorpha

== Paleobiology ==
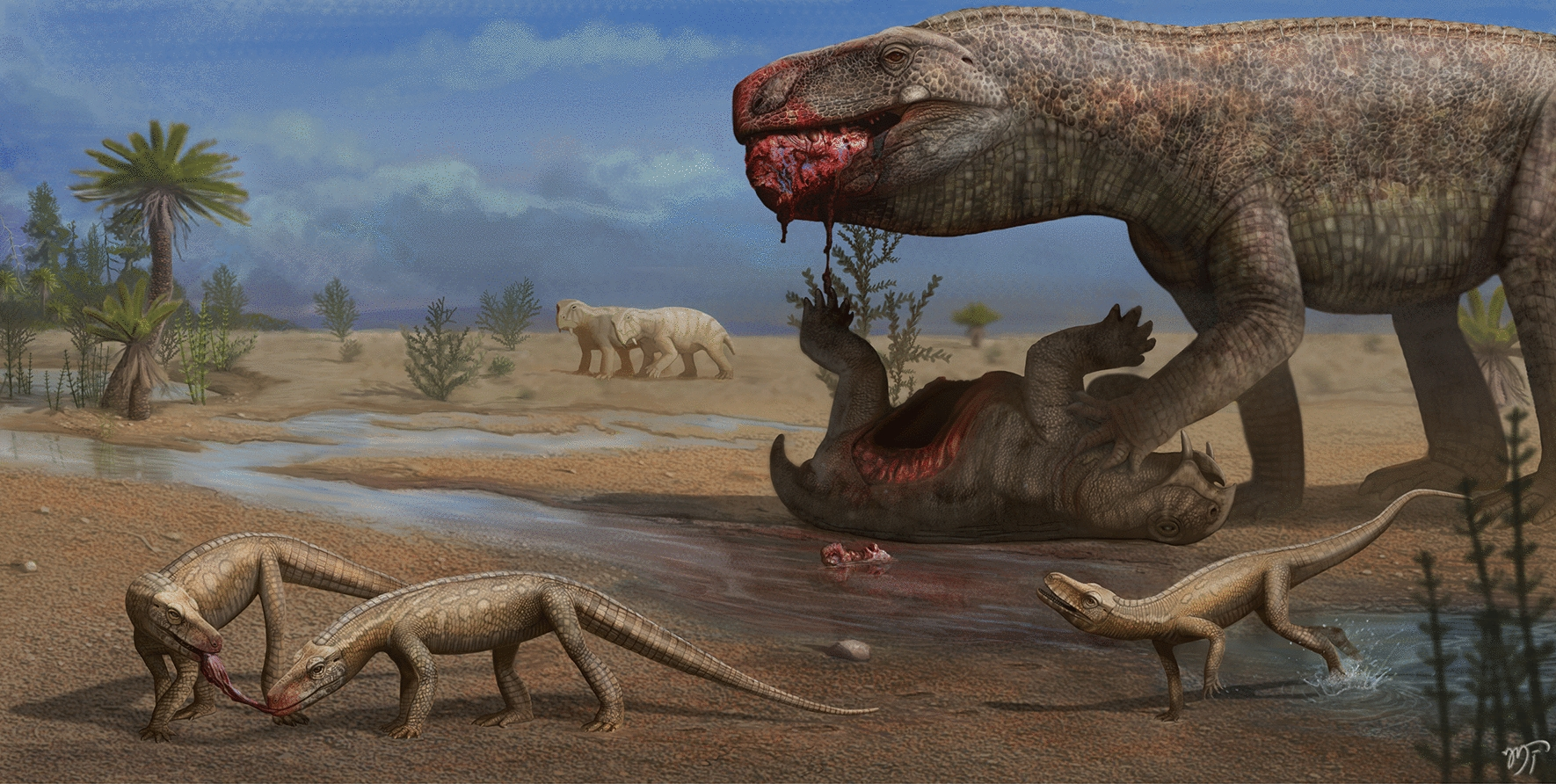
Restoration of P. chiniquensis feeding on a dicynodont while Parvosuchus take scraps

=== Musculature ===
In 2013, a study of the structure of its hind limb bones inferred that Prestosuchus chiniquensis had 13 leg muscle groups in common with both crocodilians and birds (which together make up the two living groups of archosaurs) but only two muscle groups in common with only crocodilians, indicating that the musculature of Prestosuchus better represents a basal ("primitive") condition for archosaurs than it does a derived condition for crocodile-line or pseudosuchian archosaurs. The leg musculature of Prestosuchus was also compared to that of Poposaurus, a Triassic pseudosuchian that walked on two legs. While the strongest leg muscles of Poposaurus are thought to drive the forward and backward motion of the leg necessary for bipedal movement, the strongest leg muscles of Prestosuchus were responsible for the rotation of the limb, which is an indication of quadrupedal movement. It was likely an apex predator of its habitat.

=== Growth ===
In a study on bone microstructure, Prestosuchus chiniquensis was found to have had a slower growth pattern compared to other "rauisuchians", more reminiscent of that of some notosuchians and crocodilians.
