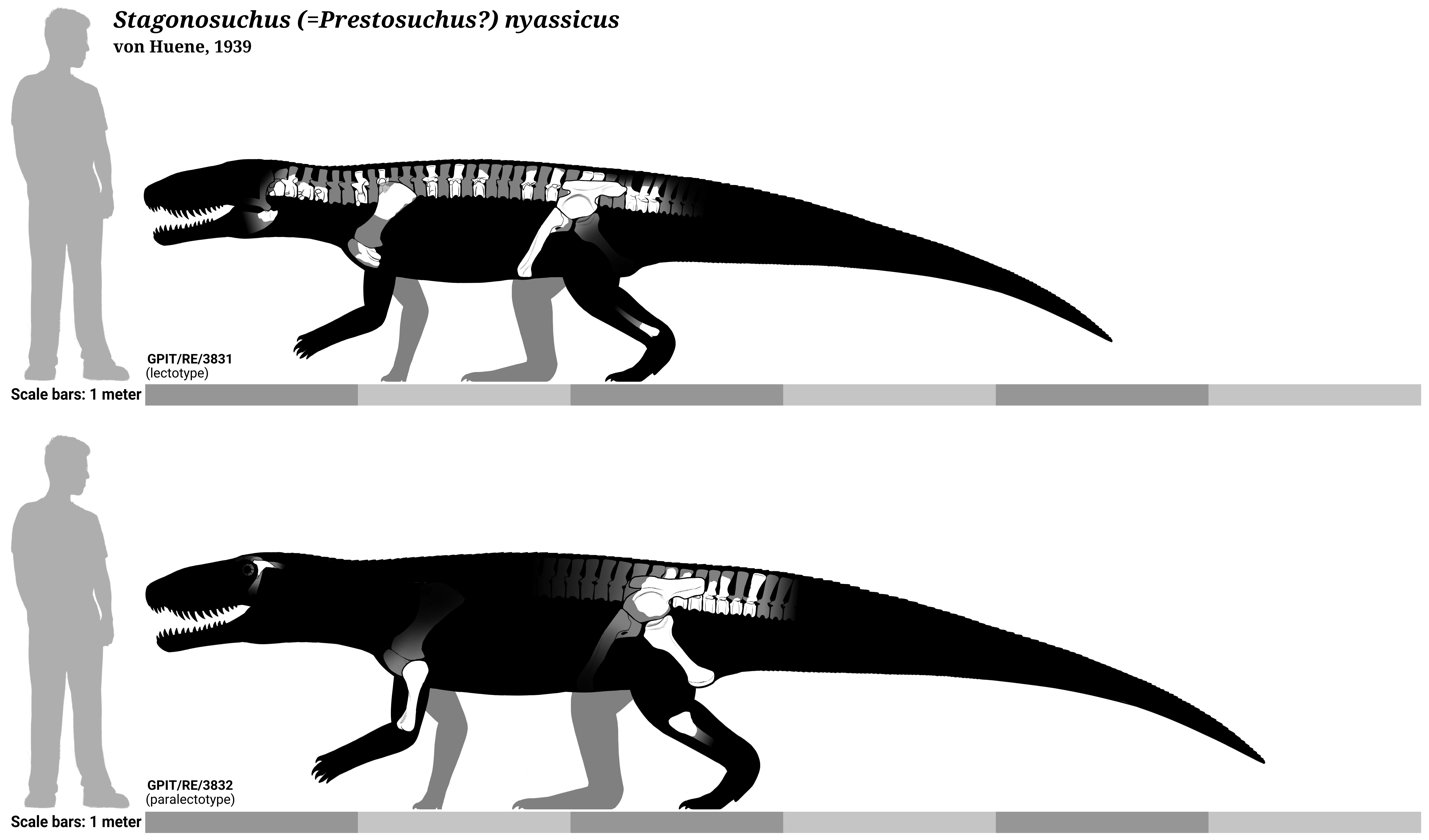
- Skeletal reconstruction and size comparison of the known specimens

Scientific classification
- Kingdom: Animalia
- Phylum: Chordata
- Class: Reptilia
- Clade: Archosauria
- Clade: Pseudosuchia
- Genus: †Stagonosuchus von Huene, 1939
- Species: †S. nyassicus

Binomial name
- †Stagonosuchus nyassicus von Huene, 1939

Synonyms
- Prestosuchus nyassicus? von Huene, 1939

= Stagonosuchus =

Stagonosuchus Temporal range: Anisian ~247–242 Ma

Extinct genus of reptiles

Stagonosuchus is an extinct genus of paracrocodylomorph, possibly a loricatan synonymous with Prestosuchus or a poposauroid. Fossils have been recovered from the Middle Triassic Manda Formation in Tanzania that are Anisian in age.

== Description ==
Unlike other rauisuchians, which have a prominent ridge on the ilium called the supra-acetabular buttress that overlies the femur, Stagonosuchus possesses only a slight thickening on the surface of the bone. In Stagonosuchus, the pubis is broad and plate like, while in other genera it is narrower and may have a prominent "foot" like that of some theropod dinosaurs.

The centra of the vertebrae are constricted to some extent, though not as much as in other rauisuchians such as Saurosuchus. In the vertebrae, the neural canals (through which the spinal cord would pass) extend into the centra, forming deep concavities. A wide articulation between the hyposphene and hypantrum in successive vertebrae prevented any lateral movement of the spine. A small accessory neural spine projects near the larger main spine, possibly as an extra attachment for bracing ligaments. Stagonosuchus also has many laminae, or ridges of bone on the vertebrae.

== Classification ==
Friedrich von Huene, who named the genus in 1938, first classified Stagonosuchus as a rauisuchid. In 1967, Alfred Romer placed Stagonosuchus in the newly erected family Prestosuchidae. However, this was likely due to the close similarities shared between the two families which made classification difficult. Stagonosuchus has since been considered a rauisuchid. A 2010 study on archosaurian phylogeny found Stagonosuchus to be outside both Rauisuchidae and Prestosuchidae in a more basal position within Rauisuchia. The study erected the name Rauisuchoidea to include it and other basal taxa that were closely related to rauisuchids and prestosuchids, including Ticinosuchus (traditionally thought to be a prestosuchid) and Arganasuchus and Fasolasuchus (previously considered rauisuchids). A 2011 study found Ticinosuchus to be the closest relative of Stagonosuchus despite a conspicuous difference in size between the two forms (Ticinosuchus is much more gracile than the larger Stagonosuchus). A 2020 study argued that Stagonosuchus was a second species of Prestosuchus, Prestosuchus nyassicus. However, a study from the same year did not recover both as sister taxa, and the 2024 phylogenetic analysis recovered Stagonosuchus outside Loricata and suggested that it could be included within Poposauroidea instead.
