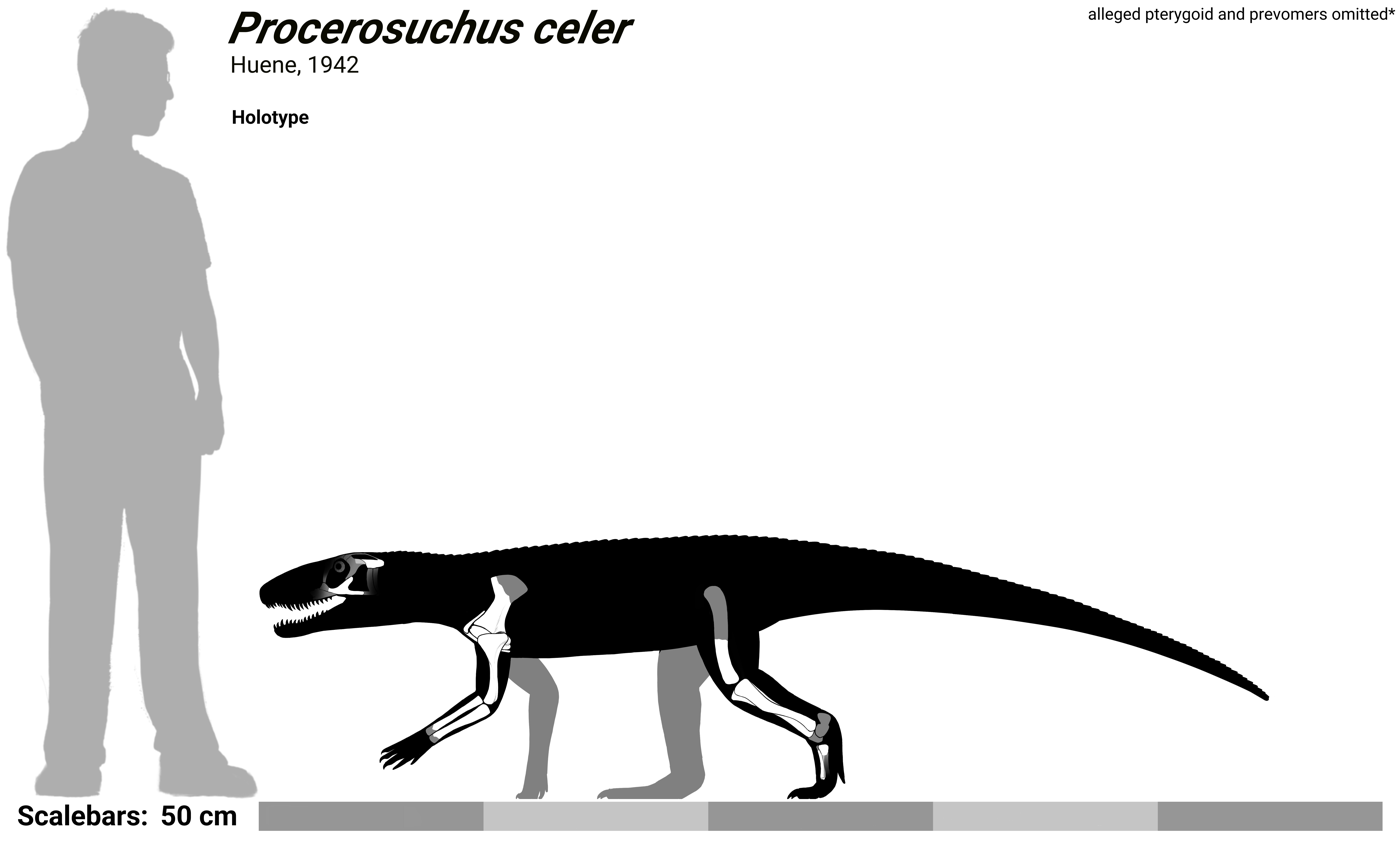
- Skeletal reconstruction of the holotype from Huene (1942)

Scientific classification
- Kingdom: Animalia
- Phylum: Chordata
- Class: Reptilia
- Clade: Archosauria
- Clade: Pseudosuchia
- Clade: Loricata
- Genus: †Procerosuchus; Huene, 1942

Type species
- †Procerosuchus celer Huene, 1942

= Procerosuchus =

Procerosuchus Temporal range: Carnian

Extinct genus of reptiles

Procerosuchus is an extinct genus of loricatan archosaur. Fossils have been collected from the Late Triassic Santa Maria Formation in Geopark of Paleorrota, Rio Grande do Sul, Brazil, which is Carnian in age. The genus was first described by the German paleontologist Friedrich von Huene in 1942.

== Classification ==
Initially, Procerosuchus was regarded as a stagonolepidid along with the genera Rauisuchus and Prestosuchus. Later, it was reassigned by Huene to the family Rauisuchidae. Alfred Sherwood Romer first considered Procerosuchus to be a possible ornithosuchid, but later assigned it to the family Prestosuchidae, which he constructed in 1966. In 1972, Romer assigned Procerosuchus as a possible member of the family Proterochampsidae. Krebs (1976) considered it to be a rauisuchid, as did Chatterjee (1985) and Carroll (1988).

Procerosuchus has been suggested to be member of the subfamily Rauisuchinae and the tribe Rauisuchini. However, the genus has not yet been included in any phylogenetic analyses of rauisuchians, and its classification remains uncertain. The taxonomy of rauisuchians is still debated (the order itself is now considered paraphyletic) and the anatomy of many taxa, including Procerosuchus, has not yet been thoroughly described. Procerosuchus does not seem to belong to a recently identified monophyletic grouping of rauisuchians termed Clade X (and now known as Poposauroidea), which includes poposaurids and ctenosauriscids.
