= Suture (anatomy) =

Fairly rigid joint between two or more hard elements of an organism

- Sutures of the human skull

Details

Identifiers
- Latin: sutura
- TA98: A03.0.00.008
- TA2: 1522
- FMA: 7493

In anatomy, a suture is a fairly rigid joint between two or more hard elements of an organism, with or without significant overlap of the elements.

Sutures are found in the skeletons or exoskeletons of a wide range of animals, in both invertebrates and vertebrates. Sutures are found in animals with hard parts from the Cambrian period to the present day. Sutures were and are formed by several different methods, and they exist between hard parts that are made from several different materials.

== Vertebrate skeletons ==
The skeletons of vertebrate animals (fish, amphibians, reptiles, birds, and mammals) are made of bone, in which the main rigid ingredient is calcium phosphate.

=== Cranial sutures ===
The skulls of most vertebrates consist of sets of bony plates held together by cranial sutures. These sutures are held together mainly by Sharpey's fibers which grow from each bone into the adjoining one.

=== Sutures in the ankles of land vertebrates ===
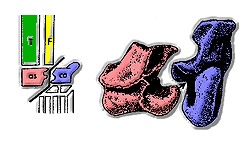
Crocodilian form of crurotarsal ankle. The astragalus (pink) is fixed to the tibia (green) by a suture. Adapted with permission from Palaeos

In the type of crurotarsal ankle, which is found in crocodilians and some other archosaurs, the astragalus is fixed to the tibia by a suture, and the joint bends around a peg on the astragalus, which fits into a socket in the calcaneum.

== Invertebrate exoskeletons ==
=== In molluscs ===
The shells of most molluscs are made of calcium carbonate (the main constituent of limestone and chalk), and of conchiolin, a protein. For more information, see Mollusc shell.

==== Sutures in the shells of cephalopods ====
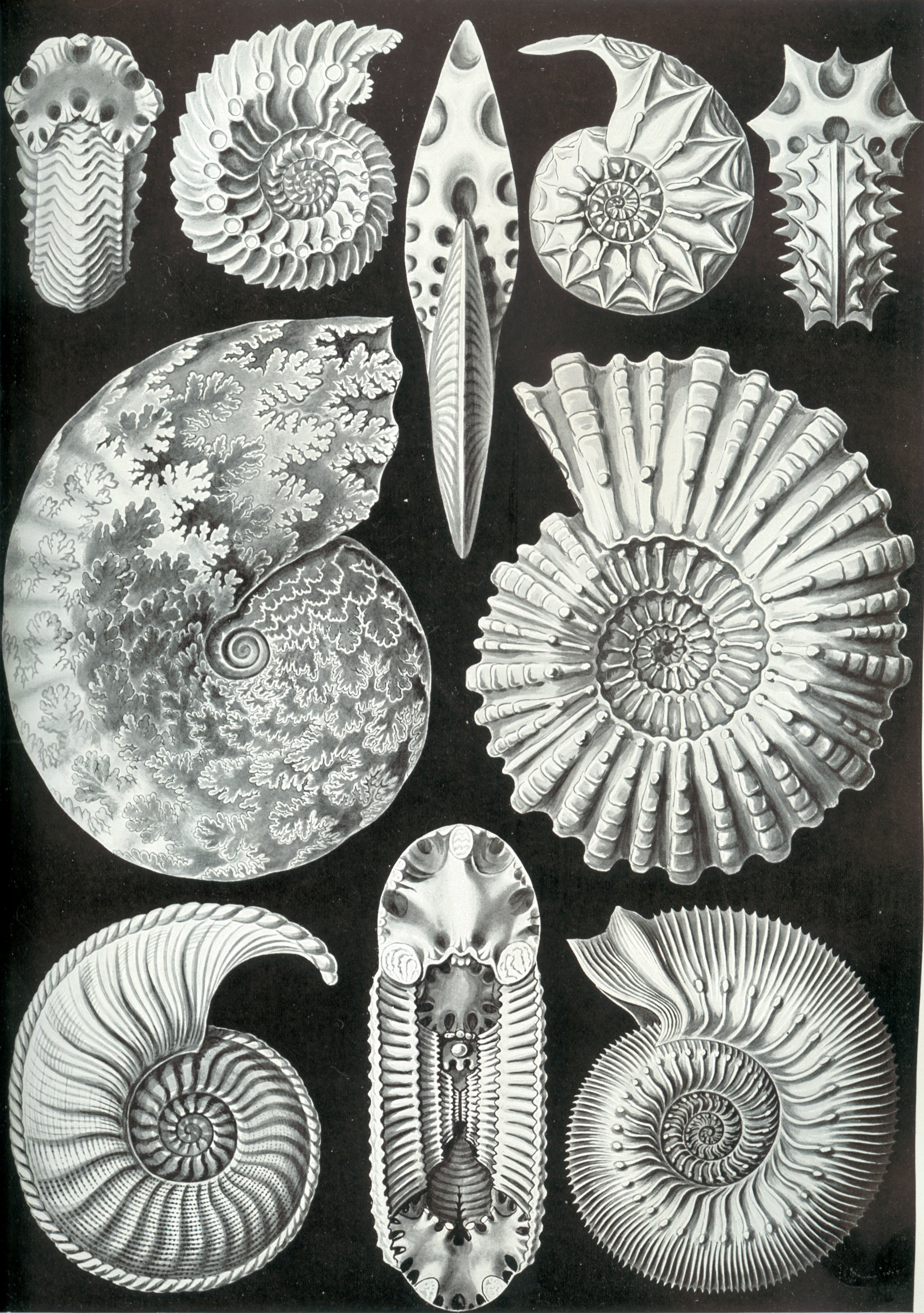
A variety of ammonite forms, from Ernst Haeckel's 1904 Kunstformen der Natur (Artforms of Nature).

In cephalopod mollusks, which have external shells (e.g. Nautilus, ammonites), the shell is divided into compartments by septa (partitions).

The septa are joined to the external shell by sutures formed by repeated invagination (they interlock like pieces of a jigsaw puzzle). The sutures are visible from the outside and often form complex and elaborate patterns.

==== The suture in the shells of gastropods ====
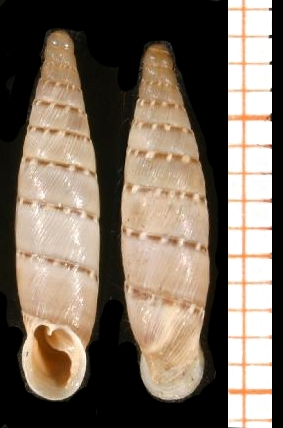
Two shells of Papillifera bidens, scale bar is in mm. These shells have 10 or 11 whorls and thus a very long suture, with an unusual sculpture of regularly placed papules along the suture itself.

Nearly all snail shells (except for the shells of limpets, abalone, sea hares, etc.) can be visualized as a tube of increasing diameter, closed at the small end, and spirally wrapped around a central axis. For more information, see Gastropod shell.

Each complete rotation of this spirally-arranged tube is called a whorl. The whorls of a snail shell usually overlap one another, forming a spire. Where the whorls overlap, there is usually a clear (if narrow) indentation. This indentation forms a visible line, which is continuous and reaches from the apex of the shell to the aperture; this line is the suture.

Details of the suture are often useful in discriminating one species from another, for example, sometimes the suture is channeled.

The suture also provides a sort of geographic marker from which one can refer to the positioning of patterning or sculpture, where that is relevant: for example some species have a darker or lighter subsutural band on the shell.

When an angulation of the whorls occurs, the space between it and the suture above it (i.e. the abaxial edge of the sutural ramp) constitutes the area known as the "shoulder" of the shell. The shoulder angle may be simple or keeled, and may sometimes have nodes or spines

=== In arthropods ===
==== Sutures in the carapaces of trilobites ====

A trilobite's carapace consisted of calcite and calcium phosphate deposited on a lattice (framework) of chitin (a polysaccharide).

The trilobite body is divided into three major sections: a cephalon (head section) with eyes, mouthparts and sensory organs such as antennae; a thorax of multiple segments which are similar to each other; and a pygidium, or tail section.

In many species, the cephalon had sutures running from back to front round the outside edges of the eyes. These sutures divided the cephalon into three pieces.

The sutures in trilobites' cephalons were unusual because it seems their main function was to create weaknesses, which made it easy for this part of the carapace ("armor") to split when the animal needed to molt.
