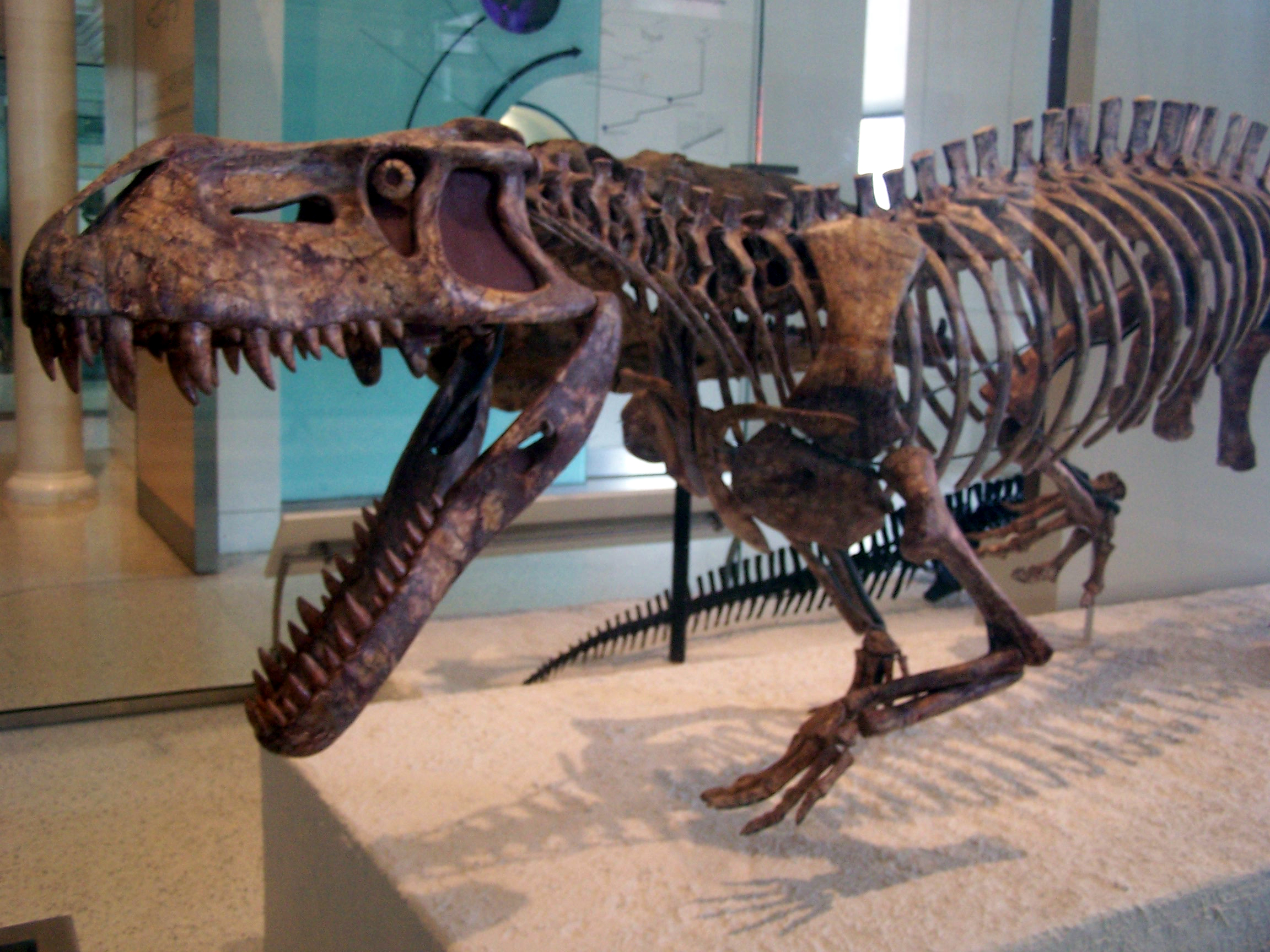
- Mounted skeleton of Prestosuchus at the American Museum of Natural History.

Scientific classification
- Kingdom: Animalia
- Phylum: Chordata
- Class: Reptilia
- Clade: Pseudosuchia
- Clade: Loricata
- Family: †Prestosuchidae; Romer, 1966

Genera
- †Luperosuchus; †Prestosuchus; †Saurosuchus

= Prestosuchidae =

Prestosuchidae Temporal range: Middle – Late Triassic, 247–225 Ma

Extinct family of reptiles

Prestosuchidae (in its widest usage) is a polyphyletic grouping of carnivorous archosaurs that lived during the Triassic. They were large active terrestrial apex predators, ranging from around 2.5 to 7 metres (8.2 to 23.0 ft) in length. They succeeded the Erythrosuchidae as the largest archosaurs of their time. While resembling erythrosuchids in size and some features of the skull and skeleton, they were more advanced in their erect posture and crocodile-like ankle, indicating more efficient gait. "Prestosuchids" flourished throughout the whole of the middle, and the early part of the late Triassic, and fossils are so far known from Europe, India, Africa (Tanzania), Argentina, and Paleorrota in Brazil. However, for a long time experts disagree regarding the phylogenetic relationships of the group, what genera should be included, and whether indeed the "Prestosuchidae" constitute a distinct family.

In 2011, Prestosuchidae in its broadest definition was determined to be a poorly-diagnosed and obsolete polyphyletic group of pseudosuchians (crocodilian-lineage archosaurs) leading to the more "advanced" rauisuchids and crocodylomorphs. Some studies since then have reintroduced the term Prestosuchidae in a more limited setting. In these studies it refers to a clade containing Prestosuchus, Saurosuchus, and Luperosuchus. Even so, the validity of this clade is unclear, and it is often not supported over a paraphyletic arrangement of its constituents.

== Classification ==
In 1957, Alan Charig proposed a new family, the Prestosuchidae, to include genera like Mandasuchus, Prestosuchus, and Spondylosoma. In 1967, Alfred Sherwood Romer placed Saurosuchus and Rauisuchus within Erythrosuchidae and adopted the Prestosuchidae to include Prestosuchus, Procerosuchus, and Mandasuchus.

Prestosuchidae have often been included within Rauisuchidae, although they have sometimes considered the sister group of the aetosaurs in a monophyletic Pseudosuchia, or as a small clade intermediate between basal Crurotarsi and more advanced archosaurs such as the Aetosauridae and Rauisuchidae. J. Michael Parrish's 1993 cladistic analysis of crocodylotarsan archosaurs places the Prestosuchidae (including Prestosuchus, Ticinosuchus, and Saurosuchus) outside the crocodylomorph – poposaurid – rauisuchid – aetosaur clade. In most cladograms, prestosuchids are considered more derived than phytosaurs and ornithosuchids, but usually less derived than the poposaurids and aetosaurs.

A 2011 study of archosaurs by Sterling Nesbitt found that Prestosuchidae is a polyphyletic group of various unrelated suchians. For example, Ticinosuchus was found to be the sister taxon to Paracrocodylomorpha while Prestosuchus and Saurosuchus were basal loricatans. The study determined that many of the characteristics previously used to define Prestosuchidae were present in a wide variety of pseudosuchians. Although Parrish used many traits of the ankle to characterize prestosuchids, Nesbitt showed that these traits were present in various basal suchian groups. In 2004, Benton proposed another trait to define Prestosuchidae: a narrow, triangular antorbital fenestra. However, Nesbitt found this trait in Postosuchus (a rauisuchid), Dromicosuchus (a crocodylomorph), and Fasolasuchus (a basal loricatan).

== Evolution of the group ==
The earliest known "prestosuchid" is Mandasuchus from the Anisian of Tanzania. This was already a large animal, about 4.75 meters long. A similar but smaller form (perhaps the same genus) is Ticinosuchus of the Middle Triassic (Anisian-Ladinian) of Switzerland and Northern Italy, which was about 2.5 meters in length. The huge (6 meters long) Batrachotomus from the latest Middle Triassic (Late Ladinian) of Germany, and Prestosuchus of the early Late Triassic (Carnian) of Brazil may have been closely related animals. Yarasuchus, a lightly built archosaur from the Middle Triassic of India, was once assigned to this group, although a 2017 study placed it as an avemetatarsalian in the newly defined group Aphanosauria. Finally, Saurosuchus was a huge carnivore, 6 or 7 meters long, whose fossils are known from the Late Carnian of Argentina.

== List of genera ==
Genus	Authors	Year	Status	Age	Location	Unit	Description	Images
Batrachotomus	Gower	1999	Valid	Late Ladinian	Germany	Kupferzell, Crailsheim and Vellberg-Eschenau		
Decuriasuchus	França; Ferigolo; Langer	2011	Valid	Ladinian	Brazil	Santa Maria Formation		
Heptasuchus?	Robert M. Dawley, John M. Zawiskie and J. W. Cosgriff	1979	Valid	Carnian	United States	Popo Agie Formation		
Karamuru	Kischlat	2000	Junior synonym?	Middle Triassic	Brazil	Santa Maria Formation	Dubious, probably a synonym of Prestosuchus	
Luperosuchus	Romer	1971	Valid	Late Ladinian or Early Carnian	Argentina	Chanares Formation		
Mandasuchus	Butler et al.	2018	Valid	Anisian	Tanzania	Manda Formation		
Prestosuchus	Huene	1942	Valid	Late Triassic	Brazil	Santa Maria Formation		
Saurosuchus	Reig	1959	Valid	Late Carnian	Argentina	Ischigualasto Formation		
Stagonosuchus	Huene	1938	Junior synonym?	Anisian	Tanzania	Manda Formation	May be a junior synonym of Prestosuchus, or outside Loricata (possibly a poposauroid)	
Ticinosuchus	Krebs	1965	Valid	Late Anisian	SwitzerlandItaly	Mittlere Grenzbitumenzone		
