= Crurotarsal =

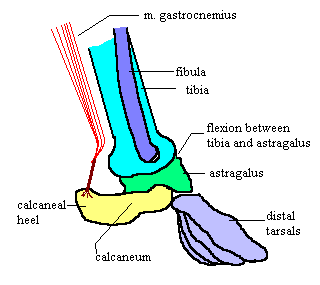
Therian form of crurotarsal ankle. Adapted with permission from Palaeos

A crurotarsal joint is one that's situated between the bones of crus, i.e. shin (tibia and fibula) and the proximal tarsal bones, i.e. astragalus and calcaneum.

The ankle joint of therian mammals (marsupials and placentals) is a crurotarsal joint, with the main joint of ankle bending between the tibia and the astragalus; the calcaneum has no contact with the tibia but forms a heel to which muscles can attach.

A group of archosauriform diapsids, Crurotarsi (including living crocodilians and their extinct relatives) is named after specialized crurotarsal joint in the skeletons of the members of this group, located between their fibula and calcaneum, with a hemicylindrical condyle on the calcaneum articulating against fibula. This joint is present in the skeletons of suchians (including crocodilians) and phytosaurs, and was cited as one of the characters supporting uniting these two groups in a clade to the exclusion of avemetatarsalian archosaurs (birds and their extinct relatives). However, according to a study published in 2011, suchians are more closely related to Avemetatarsalia than to phytosaurs; there is, however, not enough information to find out whether the aforementioned crurotarsal joint evolved independently in suchians and in phytosaurs, or whether it was already present in the skeleton of their most recent common ancestor (and secondarily lost in avemetatarsalians).

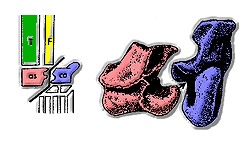
Crocodilian form of crurotarsal ankle. Adapted with permission from Palaeos

The ankle joint of pseudosuchians (including crocodilians) and phytosaurs, passing between the astragalus and calcaneum, is also called crurotarsal joint in the literature. In the skeletons of the phytosaurs and most of the pseudosuchians this joint bends around a peg on the astragalus which fits into a socket in the calcaneum (the “crocodile normal” tarsus); only in the skeletons of the ornithosuchid pseudosuchians a peg on the calcaneum fits into a socket in the astragalus (the “crocodile reversed” tarsus). Strictly speaking this ankle is not a crurotarsal joint in the previously discussed sense, as it's situated between the two proximal tarsal bones. However, while calcaneum is not fixed to the fibula, the astragalus is fixed to the tibia by a suture and thus in practice it functions as an extension of the crus.
