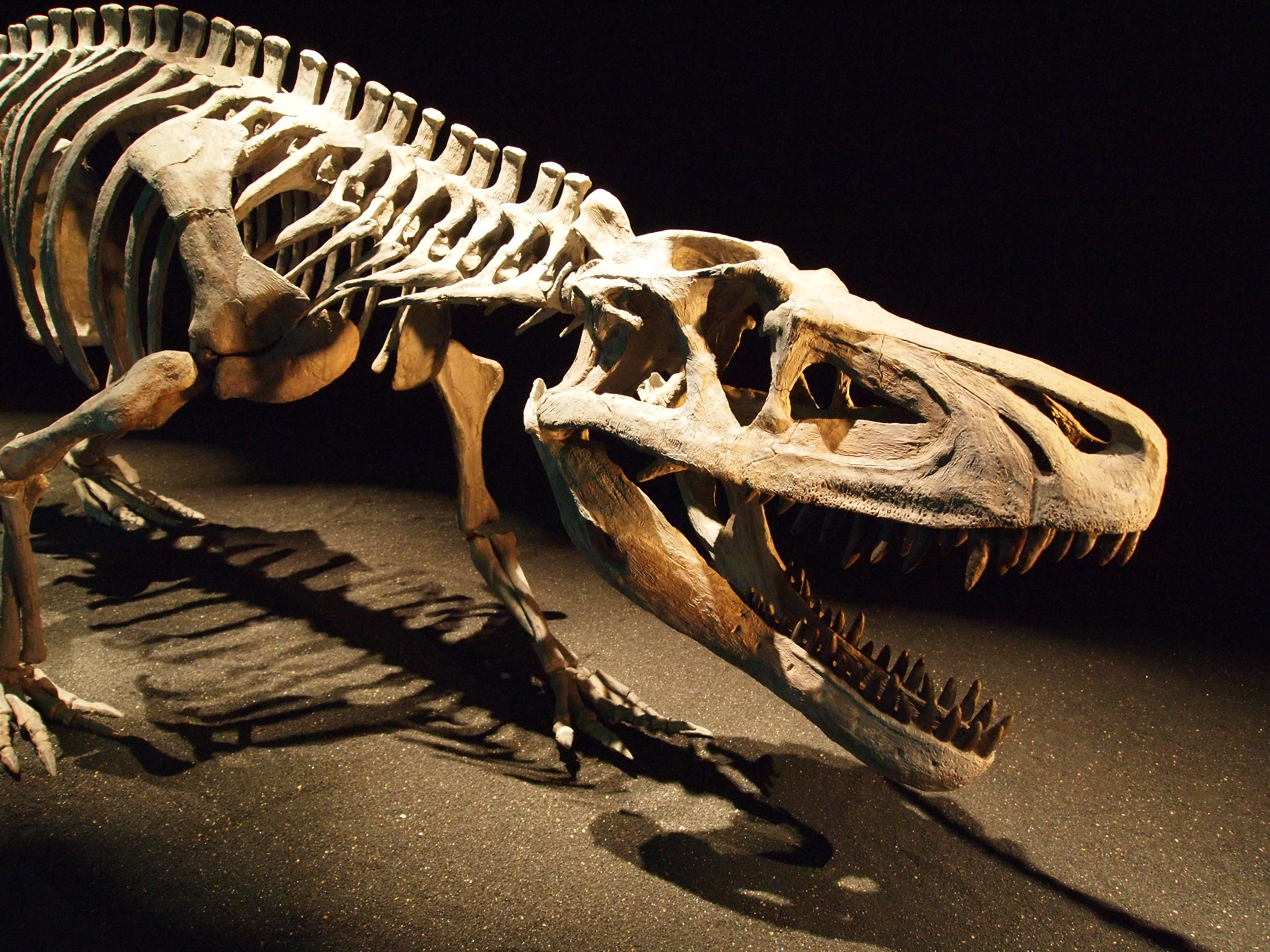
- Mounted replica skeleton of Saurosuchus galilei in Mori Art Museum Gallery, Japan
- Life reconstruction of Saurosuchus galilei, based on specimen PVSJ 32

Scientific classification
- Kingdom: Animalia
- Phylum: Chordata
- Class: Reptilia
- Clade: Pseudosuchia
- Clade: Paracrocodylomorpha
- Clade: Loricata
- Family: †Prestosuchidae
- Genus: †Saurosuchus; Reig, 1959
- Species: †S. galilei

Binomial name
- †Saurosuchus galilei Reig, 1959

= Saurosuchus =

Saurosuchus Temporal range: Late Triassic, Late Carnian to Early Norian 231.4–225 Ma

Paracrocodylomorph reptile genus from Late Triassic period

Saurosuchus (meaning "lizard crocodile") is an extinct genus of large loricatan pseudosuchian archosaurs that lived in South America during the Late Triassic period. The first and holotype specimen was discovered in 1957 by Galileo J. Scaglia and Leocadio Soria in the strata of the Ischigualasto Formation in northwestern Argentina. The type and only species, S. galilei, was named in 1959 by Osvaldo A. Reig. Several specimens, including an adult and multiple subadults, have been discovered since.

Saurosuchus is estimated to have measured 5.5–7 m (18–23 ft) in length and to have weighed up to 590 kg (1,300 lb), making it one of the largest "rauisuchians". Its skull was large, measuring up to 58.6 cm (23.1 in), and was strongly convergent with that of large theropod dinosaurs. The skull was wider behind the eyes than in front of the eyes. Its neck was short and robust, and would have been powerfully muscled. At the back of the skull, the supraoccipital bone would have served as an attachment site for powerful neck ligaments.

Saurosuchus inhabited a region dominated by floodplains and fluvial environments, which would have experienced seasonal rainfall. It would probably have been the apex predator of its environment. Endocast analysis of Saurosuchus' braincase suggests that it had a high hearing range, though was most attuned to detecting low-frequency sounds, and that it was heavily reliant on its sense of smell to locate sources of food.

== Discovery and naming ==
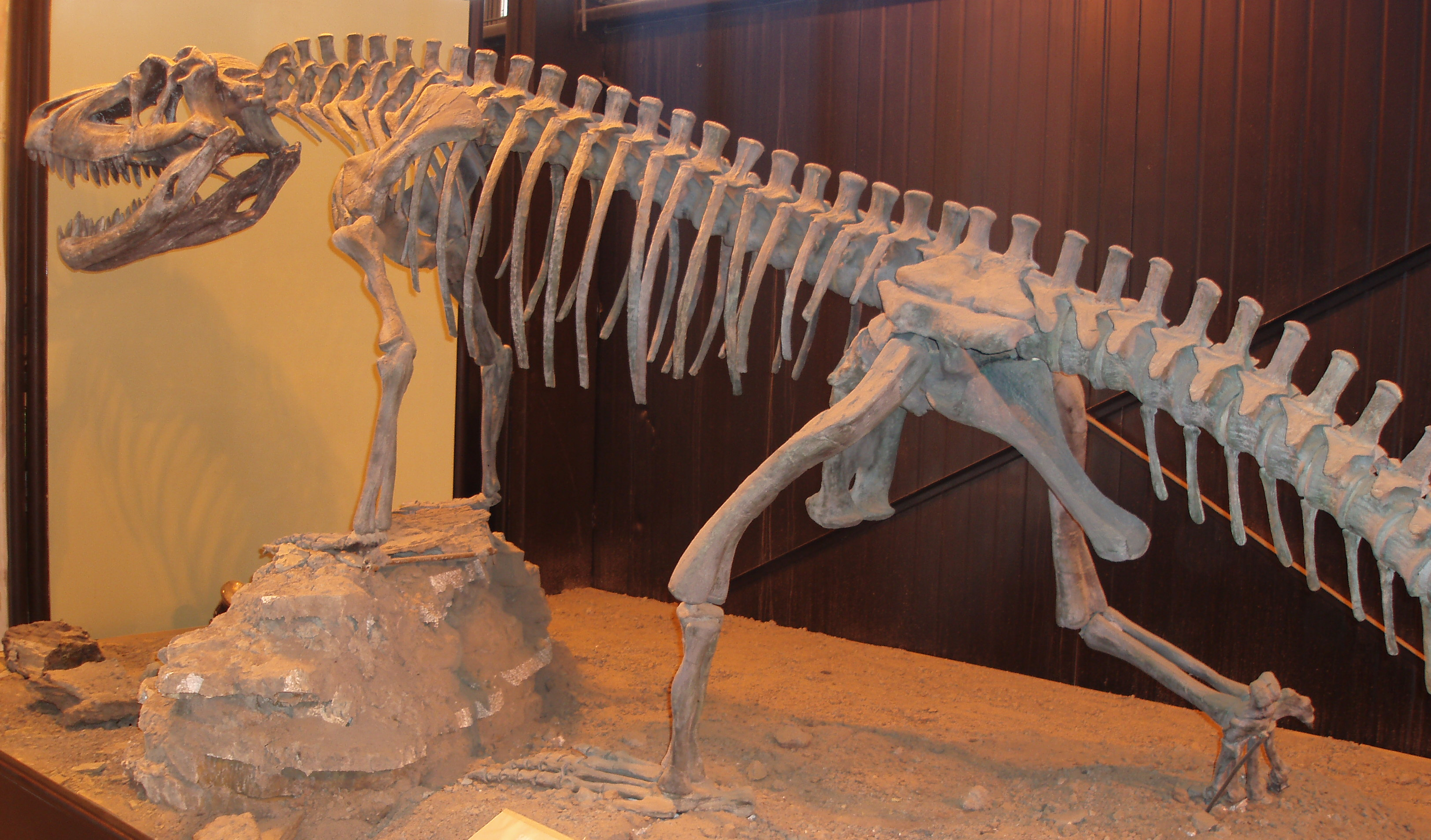
Posterior view of a replica skeleton mounted at the Ischigualasto Provincial Park visitor center

The holotype, PVL 206, was discovered by Galileo J. Scaglia and Leocadio Soria in 1957, lying in a greenish sandstone on the Cancha de Bochas Member of the Ischigualasto Formation in the Ischigualasto-Villa Unión Basin in northwestern Argentina. It consists of a nearly complete, but deformed skull. Saurosuchus was formally described and named later in 1959 by Osvaldo. A. Reig. The generic name, Saurosuchus, is derived from the Greek σαῦρος (sauros, meaning lizard) and σοῦχος (souchus, meaning crocodile). The specific name, galilei, is in honour to Galileo J. Scaglia, who unearthed and prepared the holotype.

=== Referred specimens ===
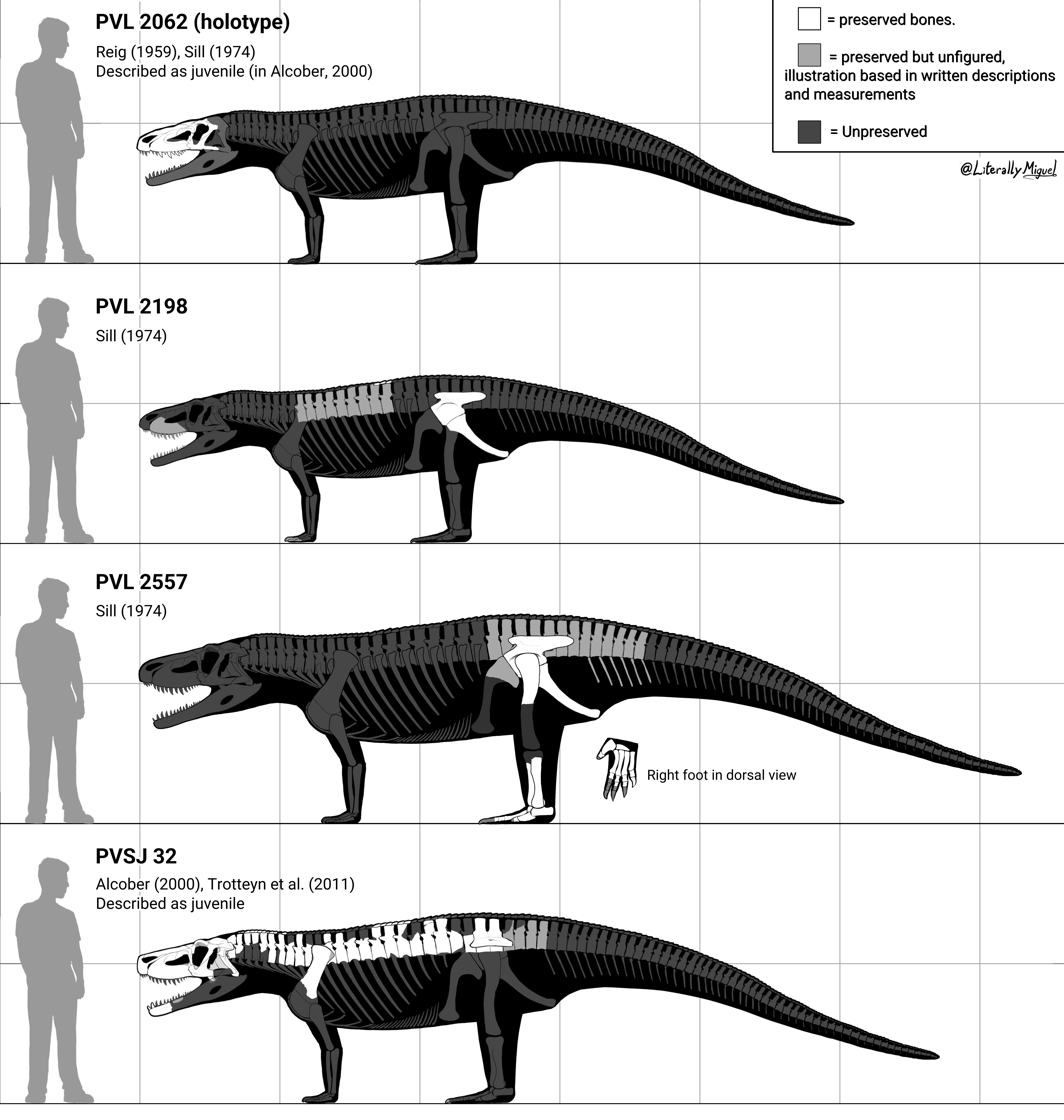
Skeletal diagrams and size comparisons of the holotype and notable referred specimens

Saurosuchus is known from numerous specimens coming from the Ischigualasto Formation. Apart from the holotype, another individual was identified: Specimen PVL 2198, consisting of a partial maxilla, left ilium, right and left ischium, 11 dorsal vertebrae, osteoderms, ribs, and teeth. Sill referred additional specimens, PVL 2557, 2472 and 2267. The specimen PVL 2557 consists of two dorsal vertebrae, right and left sacrals, nine caudal vertebrae, right ilium, ischium and partial pubis, right femur, tibia, fibula, tarsus and pes, ribs, and chevrons. PVL 2472 compromises one cervical vertebra, tibia and astragalus. Lastly, PVL 2267 is composed by a fragmented ilium, femur, tibia, fibula, tarsus, and partial pes.

In 2010, during the redescription of the skull of Saurosuchus, Alcober referred and described the immature specimen PVSJ 32, consisting of a complete skull, complete cervical and dorsal vertebral series, four anterior caudal vertebrae, ribs, and two dorsal osteoderm rows. The postcranial remains of this specimen, were properly described by Trotteyn and colleagues in 2011. Here, more specimens of Saurosuchus were referred: PVSJ 369, 675, and 615. In addition, the previous specimens PVL 2472 and PVL 2267 were excluded, with both of them being not referable to Saurosuchus.

Saurosuchus was also reported from the Chinle Formation of Arizona in 2002 on the basis of isolated teeth and small skull fragments. The diagnostic value of these bones has been questioned in later studies, which considered them to be from an indeterminate species of rauisuchian.

== Description ==
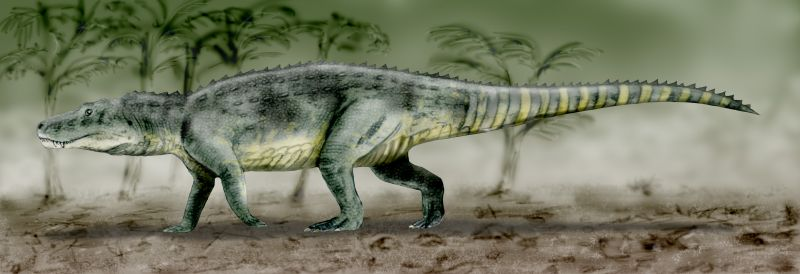
Life restoration of S. galilei

Saurosuchus was a large, quadrupedal animal. Adults measured between 5.5–7 m (18–23 ft) in length, and are estimated to have weighed 590 kg (1,300 lb). This would make it one of the largest "rauisuchians", after the enormous Fasolasuchus. Oscar Alcober mentioned its total estimated body length up to 30 ft (9.1 m) without a rationale in 2000, but von Baczko et al. (2023) criticized that this is a considerable overestimate founded on the assumption that specimen PVSJ 32 was a juvenile with potential for considerable growth. Two sub-adult specimens are estimated to have measured 4.07 m (13.4 ft) long and weighed approximately 385 kg (849 lb).

=== Skull ===
Saurosuchus' skull, like many large "rauisuchians", was akin to that of theropod dinosaurs. The largest known S. galilei skulls, those of the holotype (PVL 2026) and PVSJ 32, are about the same length, 58.6 cm (23.1 in), although initially the former was estimated at about 67 cm (26 in). The skull is deep and somewhat compressed laterally (from side-to-side): it was wide at the back, measuring 17 cm (6.7 in) at its widest extent, and narrows in front of the eyes, measuring 10 cm (3.9 in) in front of the orbits (eye sockets). At the bottom of the premaxilla is a small hole, or fenestra, known as the subnarial fenestra, assumed by O. Alcober to be present in all "rauisuchids" with the exception of Prestosuchus. Each premaxilla bears three teeth. The maxilla is very large and u-shaped, and each maxilla appears to have sported twelve dental alveoli (tooth sockets). It and the skull roof, are both covered in a series of small pits; such pitting is also seen in aquatic phytosaurs and crocodilians, but the ridges and grooves are deeper and much more extensive across the skulls of those taxa. The nasal bone is small and thin. The frontal bones, located at the top of the skull, are enlarged to form thick ridges over the eyes. As in more derived loricatans, a small rod projects down from the lacrimal bone in front of the eye, but it does not attach firmly to the jugal bone below it. Ridges along the upper surface of the supraoccipital bone at the back of the skull would have served as attachment sites for strong neck ligaments. The teeth of S. galilei are large, recurved, and serrated.

=== Vertebral column ===
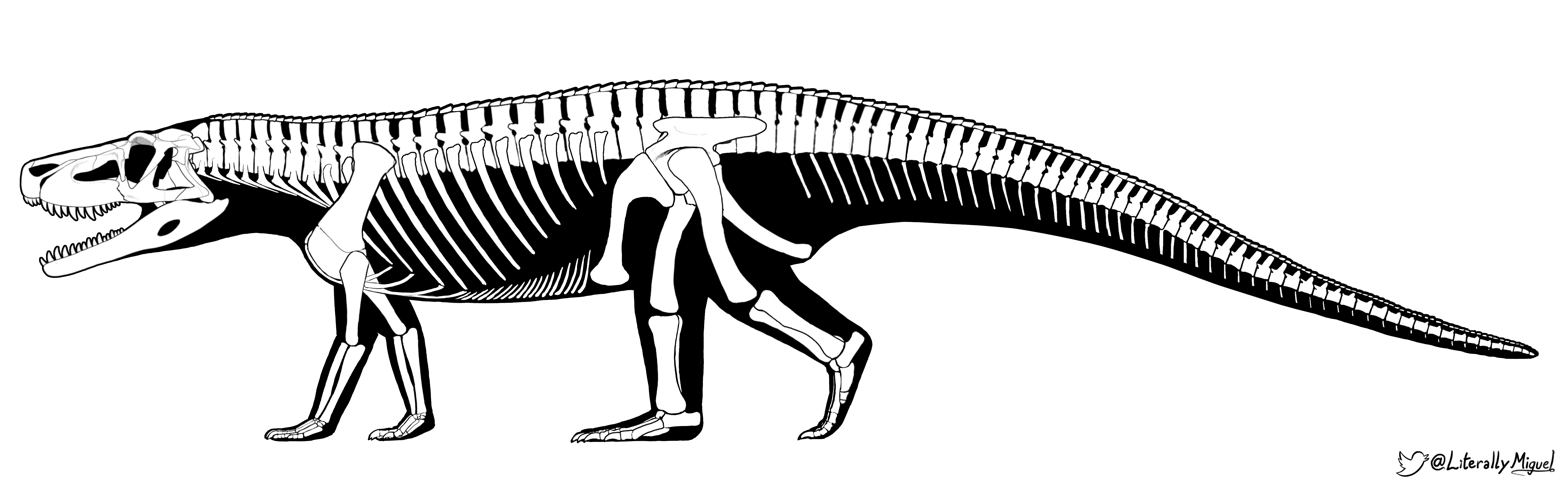
Skeletal diagram of Saurosuchus galilei based on multiple specimens

The number of presacral vertebrae in Saurosuchus (the bones in the spine anterior to, or in front of, the sacrum) is not known, though it is likely that twenty-four were present. The cervical (neck) vertebrae of Saurosuchus, of which there were likely nine, are shortened and robust, and as such the neck would have been strong. It is difficult in rauisuchians to determine where the cervical column ends and the dorsal (back) column begins, though it is believed that there were around fifteen in all. The most anterior dorsal vertebrae are tall dorsoventrally (from top to bottom) and short from front to back; the following vertebrae are similarly tall, though longer. Only two sacral and nine caudal (tail) vertebrae are known.

=== Pectoral and pelvic girdles ===
The pectoral (shoulder) girdles of Saurosuchus are fragmentary and are only known from specimen PVSJ 32. The scapulae are fairly short and robust, with a maximum width along the diaphysis (shaft) being around a quarter of their total estimated length. The pelvic girdle (the hip region) is similar to that of other crurotarsans, with an ischium split into two large expansions: the anterior portion is thinner than the posterior one. As in taxa such as Fasolasuchus, the pubis contributes only partly to the anterior margin of the acetabulum and does not form a major part of the cavity. The posterior portion of the ilium has prominent processes (projections) before and after the acetabulum, and similar to Batrachotomus, the posterior process was longer than the anterior one.

=== Osteoderms ===
Two rows of osteoderms sit on the vertebral midline, one on each side. Each leaf-shaped osteoderm joins tightly with the ones in front of and behind it.

== Classification ==
Saurosuchus was considered a member of the Rauisuchia, although the clade is now considered paraphyletic and Saurosuchus is considered a basal member of Loricata, a clade comprising "rauisuchians" as well as crocodylomorphs. Below is a cladogram of Loricata, based on an analysis conducted by Nesbitt in 2011:

- Paracrocodylomorpha
  - Poposauroidea
  - Loricata
    - Prestosuchus
    - - Saurosuchus
      - - Batrachotomus
        - - Fasolasuchus
          - - Rauisuchidae
            - Crocodylomorpha

In more recent analyses, Saurosuchus has been found within the loricatan clade Prestosuchidae. The cladogram below follows a simplified version of the strict reduced consensus tree by Desojo and colleagues (pubilished in 2020):

- Archosauria
  - Avemetatarsalia
  - Pseudosuchia
    - Ornithosuchidae
    - Suchia
      - - Revueltosaurus
        - Aetosauria
      - - Gracilisuchidae
        - - Ticinosuchus
          - Paracrocodylomorpha
            - Mandasuchus
            - Poposauroidea
            - Loricata
              - Pagosvenator
              - Prestosuchidae
                - Saurosuchus
                - Prestosuchus
              - - Batrachotomus
                - - Fasolasuchus
                  - - Rauisuchidae
                      - Rauisuchus
                      - - Polonosuchus
                        - Postosuchus
                    - Crocodylomorpha

== Paleobiology ==
Analysis of the best preserved Saurosuchus specimen (PVSJ 32) performed by Fawcett and colleagues in 2023 indicated that it had a generally mechanically strong skull but a surprisingly weak bite for an animal of its size, with estimated bite forces of 1,015 and 1,885 N (228 and 424 lb_{f}) at the front and back of the jaws respectively, comparable to modern gharials. This could be explained by the overall shape of the skull being somewhat rectangular in lateral view with a slightly concave ventral edge to the maxilla, further compromised by the thinness of several jaw bones in comparison to those of a theropod dinosaur skull of similar size. While they considered PVSJ 32 to be a juvenile, its large size and inferred age (16 years old) from histological examinations of its osteoderms, suggest it did not have much more left to grow, therefore, inferences to the overall functional behaviors of Saurosuchus would be fairly representative. Based on their analysis they argue that Saurosuchus did not possess adaptations for osteophagy, opting instead for a feeding behavior involving defleshing carcasses by biting off or scrapping muscle tissue with their teeth, as has been also inferred for the related Batrachotomus, different to Batrachotomus, however, which shows evidence for a preference in the use of the premaxillary teeth for defleshing with high tooth-bone interactions, Saurosuchus would have used its rear teeth and avoided contact with bone altogether.

A reconstruction of the cranial endocast revealed large olfactory bulbs, poorly developed flocculus and optic lobes, and an anteroposteriorly short lateral semicircular canal, suggesting that Saurosuchus would have relied on smell instead of eyesight to track prey over long distances or at night, and that it would not have been a particularly agile predator. Furthermore, the lagena is relatively long, suggesting a broad hearing sensitivity, especially in low-frequency sounds. A hypertrophied hypophysis has also been reported for Saurosuchus, which may be correlated with large size and possibly rapid growth rates, as observed in the majority of other "rauisuchians" based on bone microstructure.

In 2026, a paper authored by Denis A. Ponce, Ignacio A. Cerda, and Julia B. Desojo examined bone growth patterns in various Late Triassic pseudosuchians from South America. They found that Saurosuchus exhibits fibrolamellar complexes (a kind of bone tissue found in fast-growing taxa, particularly as juveniles), which suggest that it underwent fairly rapid growth, faster than any other sampled taxon (barring Sillosuchus).

== Paleoecology ==
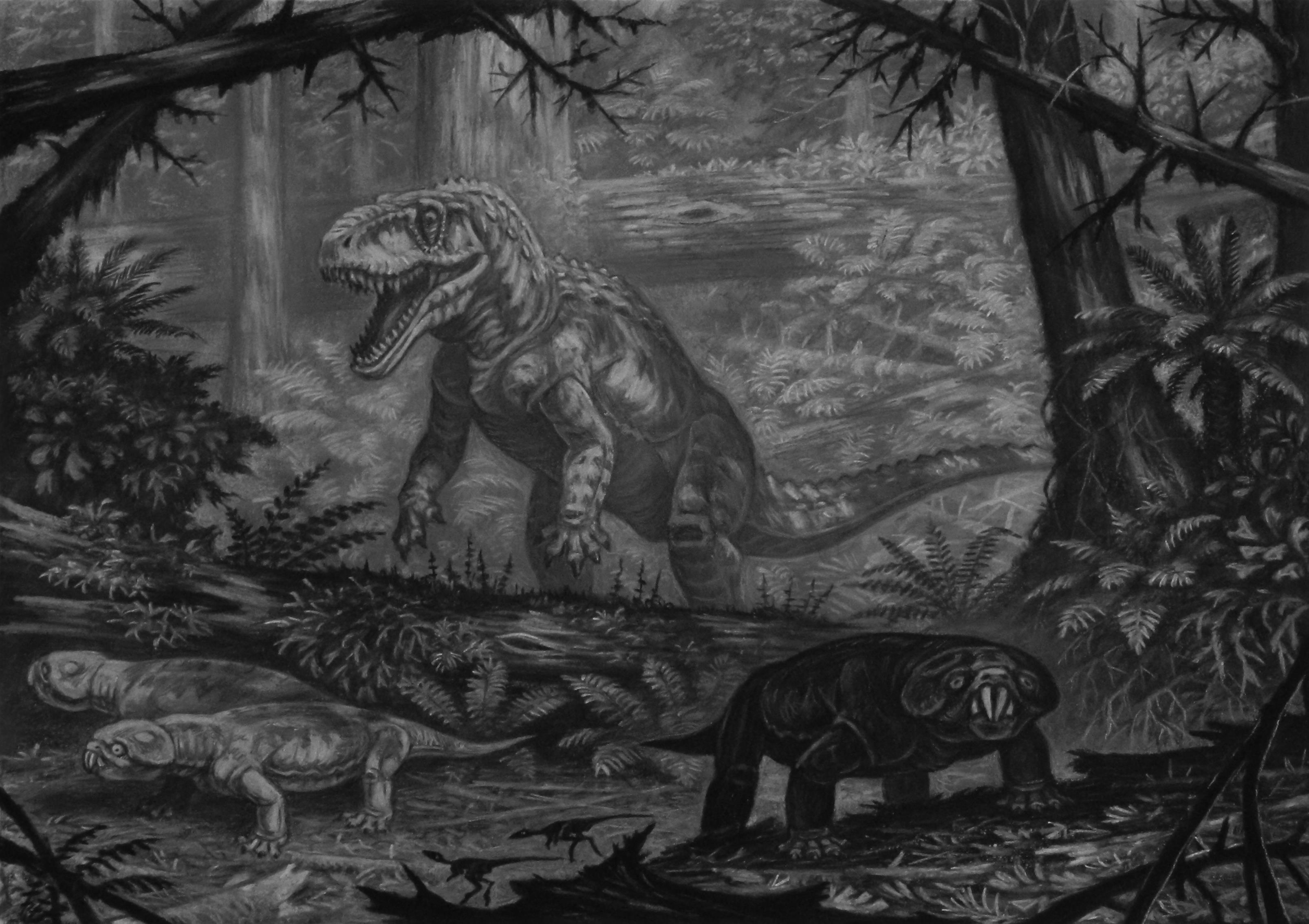
Saurosuchus hunting a group of Hyperodapedon

Saurosuchus was unearthed in the Cancha de Bochas Member from the Ischigualasto Formation, and was likely the apex predator of its environment. The Ischigualasto Formation was dominated by fluvial and floodplain environments with strongly seasonal rainfalls. Interlayered volcanic ash layers above the base and below the top of the formation provide chronostratigraphic control and have yielded ages of 231.4 ± 0.3 Ma and 227 ± 0.9 Ma respectively.

Animals that lived alongside included numerous nondinosaurian tetrapods and basal dinosauromorphs. Notable paleofauna that were contemporaneous with Saurosuchus in the Cancha de Bochas Member include: Hyperodapedon, Exaeretodon, Herrerasaurus, Sillosuchus, Eoraptor, Trialestes, Aetosauroides, and Ischigualastia. Herrerasaurus and Saurosuchus are some of the most common predators in the formation, with numerous specimens and remains.

== See also ==
- Rauisuchia
- 1959 in paleontology
- Pseudosuchia
- Crurotarsi
