= Pagosvenator =

Pagosvenator Temporal range: late Ladinian-earliest Carnian ~239–235 Ma

Scientific classification
- Domain: Eukaryota
- Kingdom: Animalia
- Phylum: Chordata
- Class: Reptilia
- Clade: Archosauria
- Clade: Pseudosuchia
- Clade: Suchia
- Family: †Erpetosuchidae
- Genus: †Pagosvenator; Lacerda, de França & Schultz, 2018

Type species
- †Pagosvenator candelariensis Lacerda, de França & Schultz, 2018

Extinct genus of reptiles

Pagosvenator is an extinct genus of erpetosuchid from the Mid-Late Triassic Dinodontosaurus Assemblage Zone of the Santa Maria Supergroup of Brazil. The type species, Pagosvenator candelariensis, was described in 2018.

Pagosvenator is a Brazilian genus which has been allied with the ornithosuchids prior to receiving a formal description in 2018. Despite only being known from a skull and a few vertebrae and osteoderms, which were anonymously donated to the Candelária Museum in 2015, it shares similarities with several erpetosuchids. Although its description only compared it with Erpetosuchus and Parringtonia, its assignment to this family does have some support. It shares a few traits with these other genera, such as maxillary teeth at only the front of the mouth and a portion of the maxilla under the lacrimal which is higher than long.
