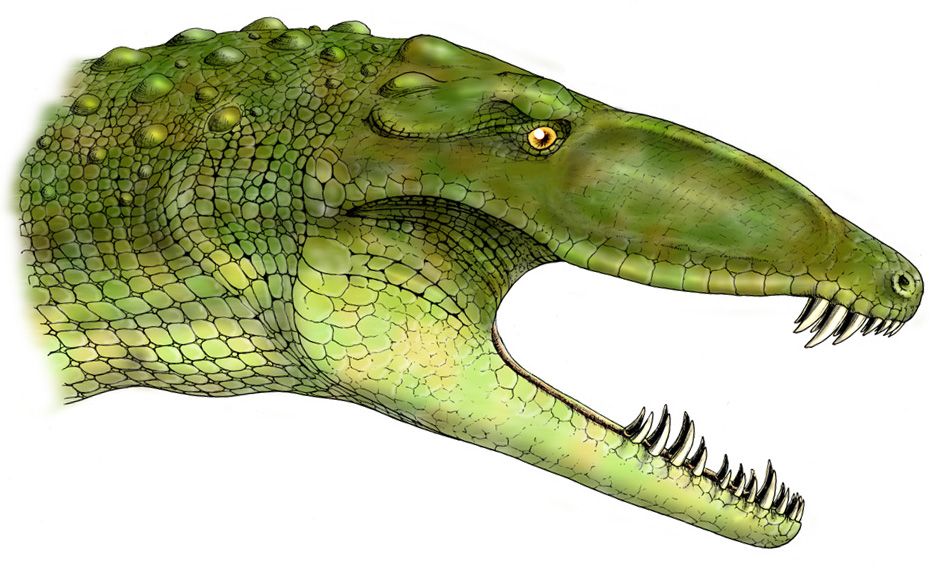
- Life restoration of Erpetosuchus granti
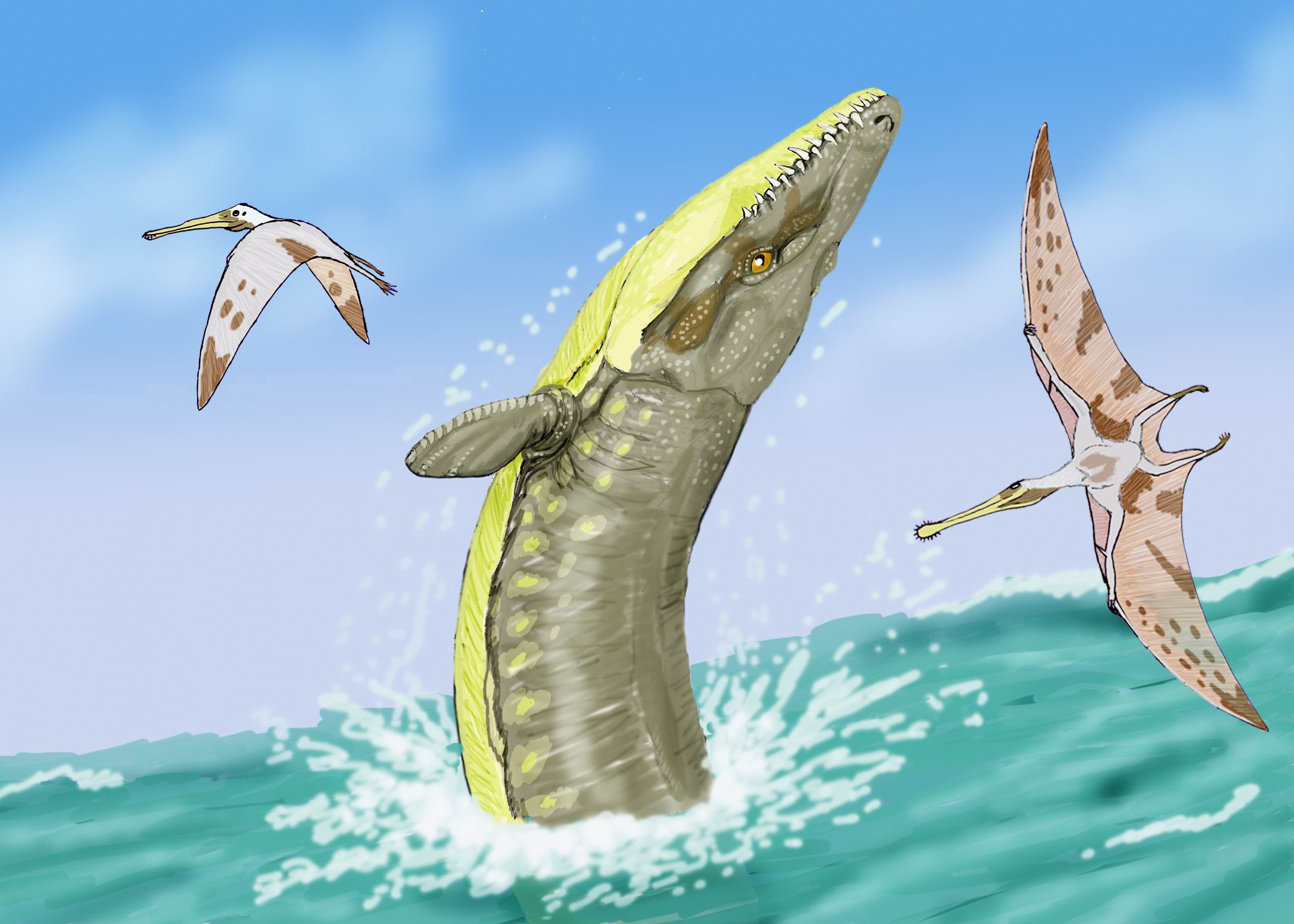
- Dakosaurus, a Crocodylomorph

Scientific classification
- Domain: Eukaryota
- Kingdom: Animalia
- Phylum: Chordata
- Class: Reptilia
- Clade: Archosauria
- Clade: Pseudosuchia
- Clade: Paracrocodylomorpha
- Clade: Loricata
- Clade: Bathyotica; Benton and Walker, 2002

Subtaxa
- †Erpetosuchidae?; Crocodylomorpha

= Bathyotica =

Bathyotica Temporal range: Late Triassic - Recent, 228–0 Ma

Clade of reptiles

Bathyotica is a clade of crurotarsan archosaurs that includes the superorder Crocodylomorpha and its sister taxon Erpetosuchus, a small Triassic suchian. Bathyotica was named in a 2002 phylogenetic study of Erpetosuchus. The genus was found to be closely related to crocodylomorphs, and Bathyotica was erected to encompass both taxa.

Bathyotica has several apomorphies, characteristics that distinguish it from more basal crurotarsans. A prominent feature is the forward sloping of the quadrate and quadratojugal bones at the back of the skull. The sloping bones open up a space called the otic recess, which is positioned behind the lower temporal fossa, a hole on the side of the skull behind the eye sockets. Members of Bathyotica also lack a postfrontal bone.

In 2012, the genus Parringtonia was redescribed and found to be closely related to Erpetosuchus. Both were united in the family Erpetosuchidae. However, the phylogenetic analysis in that paper resulted in Erpetosuchidae being part of a polytomy with the two main branches of Archosauria, Pseudosuchia and Avemetatarsalia, a distant position from Crocodylomorpha. However, this placement was uncertain and the exact phylogenetic position of Erpetosuchus remains unclear because it possesses many autapomorphies or unique features that are not seen in other archosaurs. Nevertheless, a sister-taxon relationship between Erpetosuchidae and Crocodylomorpha required 13 extra steps in their analysis, making it very improbable. Even when Erpetosuchus granti was solely used to represent Erpetosuchidae, it was recovered as the sister taxon of aetosaurs + Revueltosaurus, at the base of Suchia.
