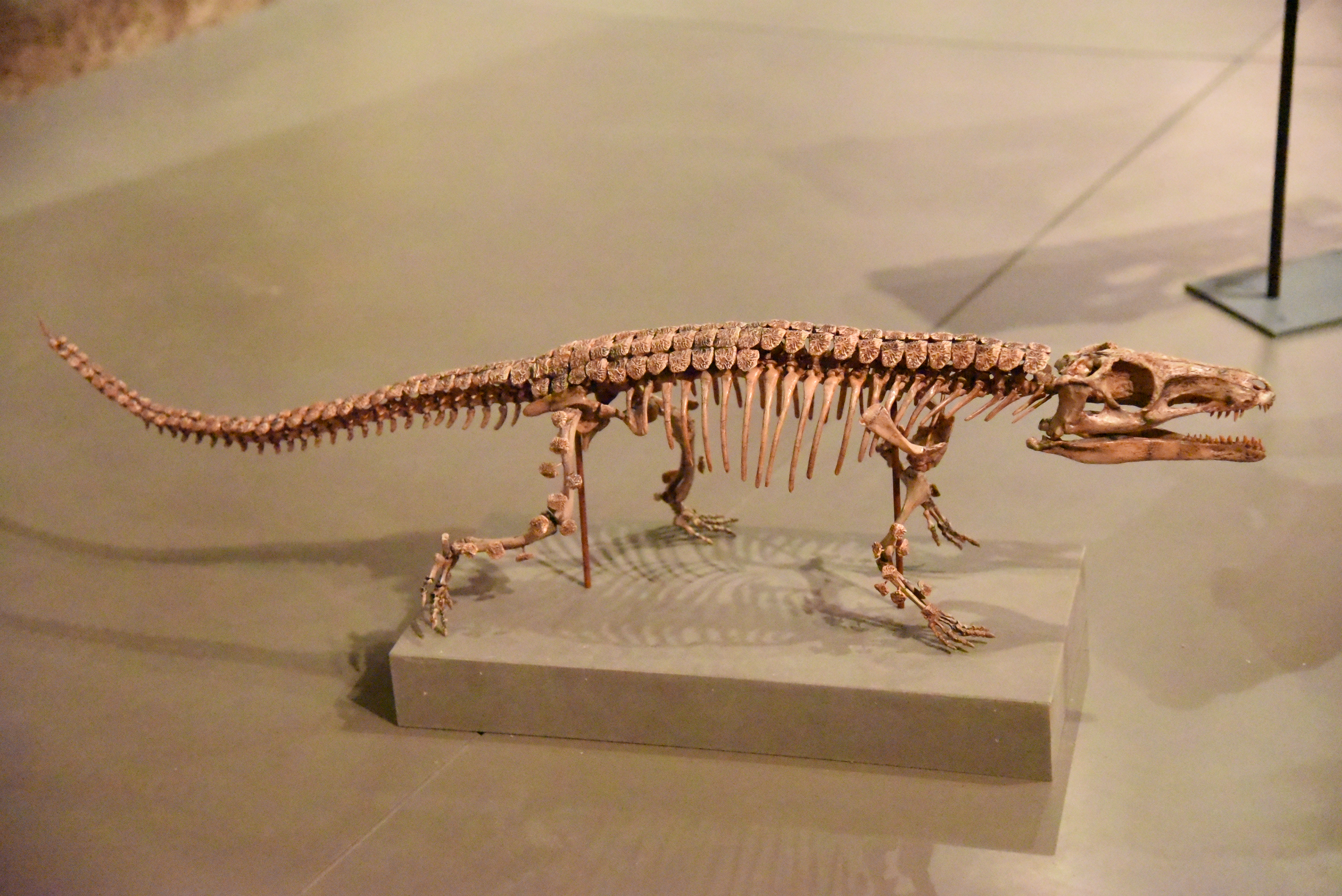
- Skeletal mount of Parringtonia at the FMNH

Scientific classification
- Kingdom: Animalia
- Phylum: Chordata
- Class: Reptilia
- Clade: Archosauria
- Clade: Pseudosuchia
- Clade: Suchia
- Family: †Erpetosuchidae; Watson, 1917

Subgroups
- †Archeopelta?; †Dyoplax?; †Erpetosuchus; †Pagosvenator; †Parringtonia; †Tarjadia

= Erpetosuchidae =

Erpetosuchidae Temporal range: Middle - Late Triassic, 247–208.5 Ma

Extinct family of reptiles

Erpetosuchidae is an extinct family of pseudosuchian archosaurs. Erpetosuchidae was named by D. M. S. Watson in 1917 to include Erpetosuchus. It includes the type species Erpetosuchus granti from the Late Triassic of Scotland, Erpetosuchus sp. from the Late Triassic of eastern United States and Parringtonia gracilis from the middle Middle Triassic of Tanzania; the group might also include Dyoplax arenaceus from the Late Triassic of Germany, Archeopelta arborensis and Pagosvenator candelariensis from Brazil and Tarjadia ruthae from Argentina.

== Description ==
=== General features ===
Erpetosuchids were lithe but well-armored carnivorous pseudosuchians. Two rows of overlapping armored plates (osteoderms) extended from the neck to the tail, supplemented by an additional row on the back and tail and small oval-shaped osteoderms on the legs and possibly the arms as well. The osteoderms were unusually sculptured by deep pits and ranged in shape and thickness between taxa.

Erpetosuchids also characteristically had upper teeth restricted to the front part of the mouth. While Erpetosuchus and Parringtonia had unserrated and only slightly mediolaterally compressed teeth, Tarjadia had thin and serrated teeth more similar to other carnivorous archosauriforms. Erpetosuchids also had broad maxillae with antorbital fenestrae set approximately in the middle of the deep antorbital fossa, which in turn was completely surrounded by bony ridges. Under the ridge which composes the ventral edge of the antorbital fossa, the maxilla (particularly the rear part) slopes inwards towards the teeth. Although erpetosuchid skulls were not low and flat like those of some archosauriform groups, they were broader than those of other basal pseudosuchians, particularly behind the orbits, which were large and pointed upwards.

They also had a deep groove or pit on the top surface of their wide neural spines, a condition quite different from that of other archosaurs. The neural spines were taller on the tail than on the back.

=== Erpetosuchus and Parringtonia ===
Life restoration of Erpetosuchus

When Erpetosuchidae was first defined to include Erpetosuchus and Parringtonia, three synapomorphies or shared characteristics were identified for the family: teeth restricted to the anterior half of the maxilla, a posterior half of the maxilla that is thicker than it is tall, and no tooth serrations (although Tarjadia was known to have serrated teeth). Other possible synapomorphies of the two taxa were considered tentative due to having not yet been sampled in the cladistic analysis. In Erpetosuchus, the medially inclined lower external surface of the maxilla continues posteriorly onto the jugal, exposing much of the external surface of the jugal in ventral view. This morphology unites the North American and European specimens of Erpetosuchus with Parringtonia gracilis. Other potential synapomorphies include a hypertrophied tuber hypothesized for the attachment of the m. triceps brachii on the posterolateral surface of the proximal scapula blade. Unlike other archosauriforms that have a small tuber in the same location, the size of the tuber in erpetosuchids is exceptionally large in relation to the overall size of the scapula. Furthermore, as Krebs (1976) hypothesized the scapula blade slightly arc anteriorly in both taxa. However, this condition is similar to that of other archosaurs, like Postosuchus kirkpatricki.

While Erpetosuchus granti and Erpetosuchus sp. are nearly indistinguishable, the scapula of Parringtonia differs from E. granti in that it has a small bump or tubercle over its shoulder socket, osteoderms that are nearly square instead of being anteroposteriorly longer than wide, and a foramen (or hole) on the outer surface of the maxilla. Parringtonia has five tooth sockets, Erpetosuchus gracilis only four, and Erpetosuchus sp. six or more (up to nine). Furthermore, Erpetosuchus sp. has a proportionally taller ascending process of the maxilla than Parringtonia.

=== Other members ===
Dyoplax, a controversial pseudosuchian from Germany, has been proposed to be a close relative of Erpetosuchus. Some similarities between the two taxa include the structure of their osteoderms (including unusual small cervical osteoderms), a recessed antorbital fenestra, ridges completely surrounding the antorbital fossa, large and upward-pointing orbits, and slender limbs. However, the preservation of the only known specimen of Dyoplax, a sandstone mold, makes analysis difficult, and Dyoplax lacks many of the features that characterize other erpetosuchids. Nevertheless, the relation of Dyoplax shares more similarities with Erpetosuchidae than with other groups it has been proposed to be related to, such as Aetosauria and "Sphenosuchia".

New specimens of Tarjadia have doubted its previous classification as a doswellid and instead supports it as a member of Erpetosuchidae. Support for this new assignment is seemingly robust, with Tarjadia possessing many erpetosuchid features. Some of these features include a lack of posterior maxillary teeth, the presence of neural spine pits, an erpetosuchid-style maxilla, and archosaurian traits which contrast with those of the doswellids, which are non-archosaurian archosauriforms. This new classification also places the former doswellid Archeopelta as an erpetosuchid, as it is a very close relative of Tarjadia.

Pagosvenator is a Brazilian genus which has been allied with the ornithosuchids prior to receiving a formal description in 2018. Despite only being known from a skull and a few vertebrae and osteoderms, it shares similarities with several erpetosuchids. Although its description only compared it with Erpetosuchus and Parringtonia, its assignment to this family does have some support. It shares a few traits with these other genera, such as maxillary teeth at only the front of the mouth and a portion of the maxilla under the lacrimal which is higher than long.

== Classification ==
Erpetosuchidae is a stem-based taxon first defined by Nesbitt & Butler (2012) as "the most inclusive clade containing Erpetosuchus granti but not Passer domesticus, Postosuchus kirkpatricki, Crocodylus niloticus, Ornithosuchus longidens or Aetosaurus ferratus". A phylogenetic analysis conducted by Nesbitt & Butler (2012) showed that Parringtonia gracilis and Erpetosuchus granti form a well-supported clade (Erpetosuchidae) within Archosauria. This analysis was based on a modified version of Nesbitt (2011) analysis, the most extensive early archosaur phylogeny to date. The results of this analysis were very similar to those of Nesbitt (2011). However, the addition of Parringtonia and Erpetosuchus decreased resolution at the base of Archosauria and resulted in a strict consensus tree with a large polytomy or unresolved evolutionary relationship. This polytomy contained Erpetosuchidae, Avemetatarsalia, Ornithosuchidae, Aetosauria and Revueltosaurus clade, Ticinosuchus and Paracrocodylomorpha clade, Gracilisuchus, and Turfanosuchus. Of the other trees produced in the analysis, Erpetosuchidae takes six possible phylogenetic positions within Archosauria. Five out of six are within the Pseudosuchia, meaning that Parringtonia and Erpetosuchus are probably crocodile-line archosaurs as was previously thought. However, none of the possible positions are within the Paracrocodylomorpha, meaning that Parringtonia and Erpetosuchus are not closely related to Crocodylomorpha. Below are the possible positions within Nesbitt's phylogeny, marked by dashed lines:

- Archosauromorpha
  - Mesosuchus browni
  - - Prolacerta broomi
    - Archosauriformes
      - Proterosuchus fergusi
      - - Erythrosuchus africanus
        - - Vancleavea campi
          - - Proterochampsia
              - Chanaresuchus bonapartei
              - Tropidosuchus romeri
            - - Euparkeria capensis
              - - Phytosauria
                  - Parasuchus hislopi
                  - - Smilosuchus gregorii
                    - Pseudopalatus pristinus
                - Archosauria
                  - - Avemetatarsalia
                    - Erpetosuchidae
                  - Pseudosuchia
                    - Erpetosuchidae
                    - - Ornithosuchidae
                        - Ornithosuchus longidens
                        - Riojasuchus tenuisceps
                      - - Erpetosuchidae
                        - Suchia
                          - Gracilisuchus stipanicicorum
                          - - Turfanosuchus dabanensis
                            - Erpetosuchidae
                          - - Erpetosuchidae
                            - - Revueltosaurus callenderi
                              - Aetosauria
                                - Longosuchus meadei
                                - - Aetosaurus ferratus
                                  - Stagonolepis robertsoni
                          - - Erpetosuchidae
                            - - Ticinosuchus ferox
                              - Paracrocodylomorpha
                                - Loricata
                                - Poposauroidea

The exclusion of Gracilisuchus and Turfanosuchus results in a more resolved topology, placing Erpetosuchidae at the base of Suchia as the sister taxon of aetosaurs plus Revueltosaurus clade. This relationship is weakly supported by only the two character states: posterior portion of the maxilla ventral to the antorbital fenestra expands dorsoventrally and two paramedian pairs of osteoderms. When E. granti was solely used to represent Erpetosuchidae, Gracilisuchus and Turfanosuchus were recovered as basal suchians, in polytomy with Ticinosuchus plus Paracrocodylomorpha and E. granti plus (aetosaurs plus Revueltosaurus) clade. Below is a cladogram after the exclusion of Gracilisuchus and Turfanosuchus (Avemetatarsalia, Loricata and Poposauroidea have been collapsed).

- Archosauromorpha
  - Mesosuchus browni
  - - Prolacerta broomi
    - Archosauriformes
      - Proterosuchus fergusi
      - - Erythrosuchus africanus
        - - Vancleavea campi
          - - Proterochampsia
              - Chanaresuchus bonapartei
              - Tropidosuchus romeri
            - - Euparkeria capensis
              - - Phytosauria
                  - Parasuchus hislopi
                  - - Smilosuchus gregorii
                    - Pseudopalatus pristinus
                - Archosauria
                  - Avemetatarsalia
                  - Pseudosuchia
                    - Ornithosuchidae
                      - Ornithosuchus longidens
                      - Riojasuchus tenuisceps
                    - Suchia
                      - - Erpetosuchidae
                          - Erpetosuchus granti
                          - Parringtonia gracilis
                        - - Revueltosaurus callenderi
                          - Aetosauria
                            - Longosuchus meadei
                            - - Aetosaurus ferratus
                              - Stagonolepis robertsoni
                      - - Ticinosuchus ferox
                        - Paracrocodylomorpha
                          - Loricata
                          - Poposauroidea

In 2017, a phylogenetic analysis by Ezcurra et al. provided a novel reinterpretation of basal pseudosuchian classification. This analysis reported that Ornithosuchidae formed a clade with Erpetosuchidae, and that this clade formed the sister taxon of Aetosauria (and presumably Revueltosaurus as well) at the base of Suchia. This contrasts with previous assumptions about pseudosuchian taxonomy, such as the idea that ornithosuchids were outside Suchia or that phytosaurs were not pseudosuchians. Although phylogenetic support for the Aetosauria+Ornithosuchidae+Erpetosuchidae clade is low, the Ornithosuchidae+Erpetosuchidae clade (as well as Erpetosuchidae itself) were well-supported. This finding, along with other hypotheses supported by this analysis, have important implications for pseudosuchian classification. The following cladogram is a simplified version of the strict reduced consensus tree of that study, and excludes non-eucrocopodan archosauromorphs.

- Eucrocopoda
  - Dorosuchus neoetus
  - Asperoris mnyama
  - - Euparkeria capensis
    - - Proterochampsia
        - Doswelliidae
        - Proterochampsidae
      - Archosauria
        - Avemetatarsalia
        - Pseudosuchia
          - Phytosauria
          - - Nundasuchus songeaensis
            - Suchia
              - - Aetosauria
                - - - Ornithosuchidae
                    - Erpetosuchidae
                      - Dyoplax arenaceus
                      - - - Tarjadia ruthae
                          - Archeopelta arborensis
                        - - Parringtonia gracilis
                          - Erpetosuchus sp.
                          - Erpetosuchus granti
              - - Gracilisuchidae
                - - Ticinosuchus ferox
                  - - - Decuriasuchus quartacolonia
                      - Luperosuchus fractus
                    - - Prestosuchus chiniquensis
                      - - - Batrachotomus kupferzellensis
                          - Youngosuchus sinensis
                        - Poposauroidea

The close relationship between erpetosuchids, aetosaurs, and Revueltosaurus is also supported by braincase features according to complete braincase material assignable to Parringtonia. For example, they all have slanted supraoccipital bones, a part of the braincase above the foramen magnum (spinal cord hole). In addition, the upper edge of the foramen magnum possesses small platforms which may have articulated with neck bones such as the proatlas, a rudimentary vertebra in front of the atlas bone.

The 2018 description of the new erpetosuchid Pagosvenator supports two phylogenetic positions for the family in particular. One of these positions is at the base of Pseudosuchia in a clade with ornithosuchids. The other position places them inside Suchia, as the sister family to the clade including gracilisuchids and Paracrocodylomorpha. Although these two positions seem to be equally likely, they are also far more likely than any other possible position. However, this source was written prior to the publication of Ezcurra et al. (2017), despite being published later, and therefore does not discuss the implications of that source. This also means that Tarjadia and Archeopelta were not yet considered erpetosuchids, and thus they were not featured in the phylogenetic analysis.
