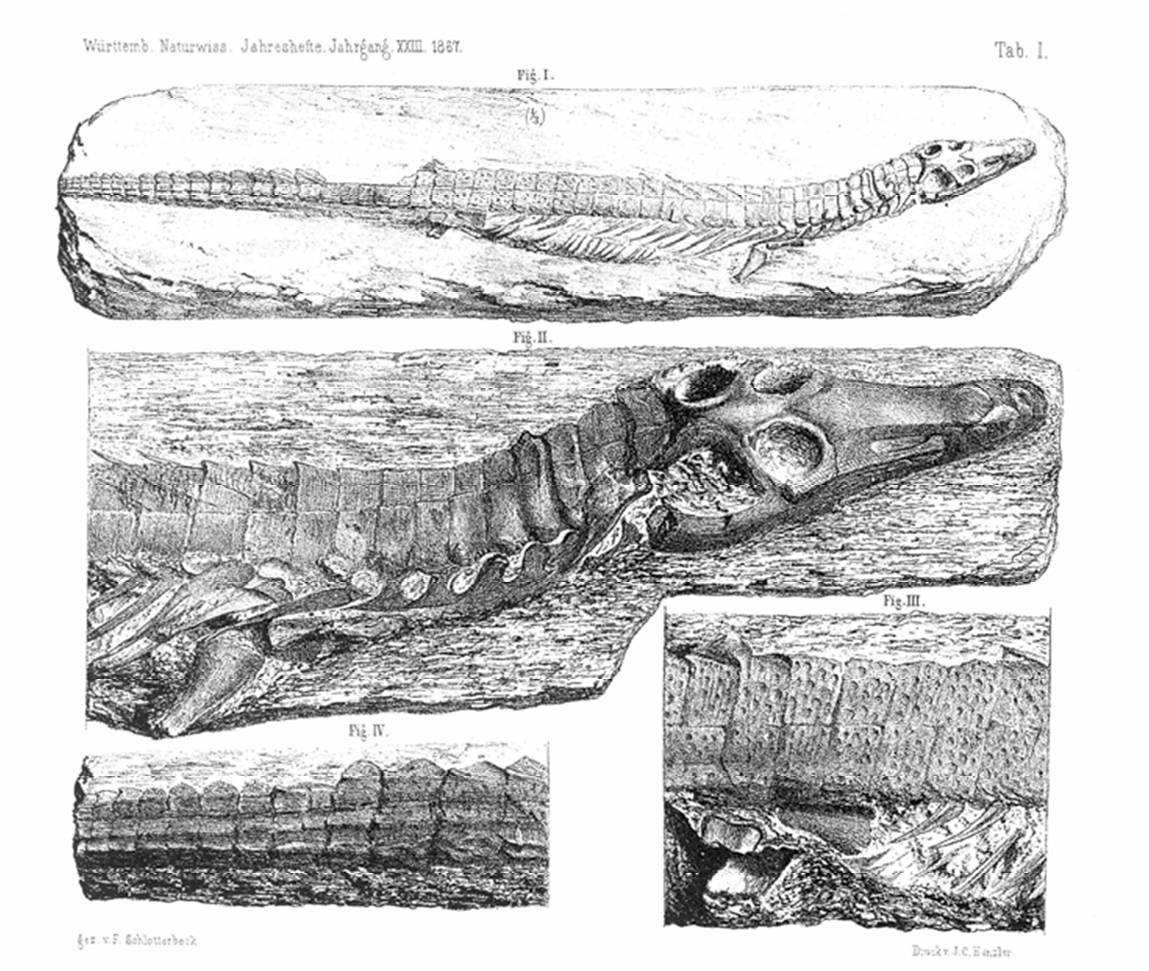
- Original lithographic illustration of the holotype of Dyoplax arenaceus, from Fraas, 1867

Scientific classification
- Domain: Eukaryota
- Kingdom: Animalia
- Phylum: Chordata
- Class: Reptilia
- Clade: Archosauria
- Clade: Pseudosuchia
- Clade: Suchia
- Family: †Erpetosuchidae
- Genus: †Dyoplax; Fraas, 1867

Type species
- †Dyoplax arenaceus Fraas, 1867

= Dyoplax =

Dyoplax Temporal range: 228 Ma Late Triassic

Extinct genus of reptiles

Dyoplax is an extinct genus of pseudosuchian archosaur, possibly an erpetosuchid. Fossils have been found from the type locality within the upper Schilfsandstein Formation in Stuttgart, Germany. The holotype specimen was a natural cast of a nearly complete skeleton that lacked only parts of the tail and limb bones.

== Classification ==
Oscar Fraas, the original describer of Dyoplax, described the specimen as having "the head of a lizard and the armor of a gavial". When the taxon Pseudosuchia was first proposed in 1890, Dyoplax was considered one of the three genera within the clade, and was included within the family "Aetosauridae". Several other papers published in later years have also placed the genus within Pseudosuchia. In 1956 the genus was referred to Notochampsidae, now known as Protosuchidae. It was suggested to be a possible erpetosuchid in 1966, but was later classified as one of the earliest protosuchids in 1994.

In that same year a paper was published that identified several synapomorphies characteristic of the clade Aetosauria. This confirmed that Dyoplax was not within the order Aetosauria as had been previously speculated because it lacked four out of five of the synapomorphies associated with Aetosauria.

A paper published in 1998 by Spencer et al. considered Dyoplax to be within Sphenosuchia, a grade of basal crocodylomorphs. The authors claimed that all synapomorphies present within Crocodylomorpha, as defined in 1992 by Sereno & Wild, were present in Dyoplax. They further concluded that the genus had most of the synapomorphies common to Sphenosuchia, lacking only the forked posterior process of the squamosal. On this basis, the authors concluded that there was enough evidence to place Dyoplax within Sphenosuchia. The age of the specimen within the strata would make Dyoplax the oldest sphenosuchian known at the time, predating other genera from the late Carnian that were once thought to be the oldest members of Sphenosuchia such as Hesperosuchus and Parrishia. However, Maisch, Matzke and Rathgeber (2013) questioned the placement of Dyoplax within Crocodylomorpha, and argued that it shared important cranial and postcranial features with Erpetosuchus; the authors tentatively reassigned Dyoplax to Erpetosuchidae.

== Paleoecology ==
The Shilfsandstein Formation was deposited during the early Carnian stage of the Late Triassic (~ 228 million years ago) in a lagoonal paleoenvironment. Numerous bivalves, chondrichthyan fish such as Palaeobates, trematosaurian temnospondyls such as Metoposaurus, a phytosaur, and plants such as Neocalamites and Equisetites were also present in the paleoenvironment that existed at the time.
