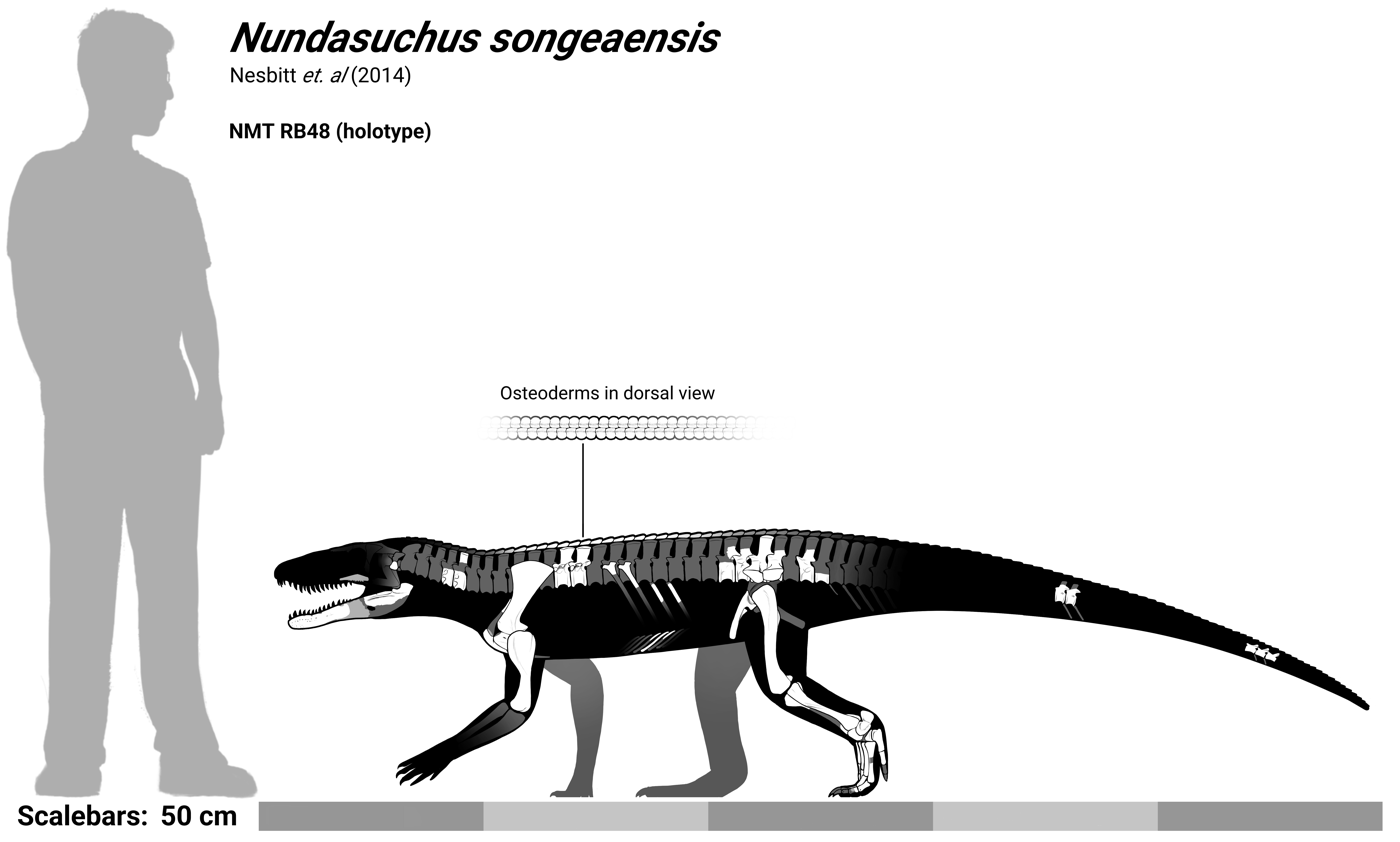
- Skeletal reconstruction of the holotype

Scientific classification
- Kingdom: Animalia
- Phylum: Chordata
- Class: Reptilia
- Clade: Archosauria
- Clade: Pseudosuchia
- Genus: †Nundasuchus; Nesbitt et al., 2014

Type species
- †Nundasuchus songeaensis Nesbitt et al., 2014

= Nundasuchus =

Nundasuchus Temporal range: Anisian ~247–242 Ma

Extinct genus of reptiles

Nundasuchus is an extinct genus of crurotarsan, possibly a suchian archosaur related to Paracrocodylomorpha. Remains of this genus are known from the Middle Triassic Manda beds of southwestern Tanzania. It contains a single species, Nundasuchus songeaensis, known from a single partially complete skeleton, including vertebrae, limb elements, osteoderms, and skull fragments.

Nundasuchus lived in what is now Tanzania, Africa around 240 million years ago. Members of this genus were likely carnivores, with ziphodont (steak knife-like) teeth and rows of bony plates (osteoderms) along their back. Phylogenetic analyses consistently place this genus within the group Crurotarsi based on features of the ankle. Most studies also consider it a pseudosuchian, meaning that it was more closely related to modern crocodilians than it was to dinosaurs. However, Nundasuchus had an upright stance, with legs situated directly underneath the body, as with various other early pseudosuchians (such as "rauisuchians" and aetosaurs) but unlike modern crocodilians.

The classification of Nundasuchus relative to other pseudosuchians is somewhat controversial. Some phylogenetic analyses place it near or at the base of the group, sometimes along with phytosaurs, based on certain plesiomorphic (primitive) features such as teeth on the palate, a short pubis, and characteristics of the calcaneum (heel bone). Another hypothesis, supported by its original 2014 description, considers it to be somewhat more "advanced" than those groups, instead being closer to Ticinosuchus and paracrocodylomorphs (the group containing "rauisuchians" and the ancestors of modern crocodilians). This classification scheme is justified by the presence of "staggered" osteoderms, heart-shaped "spine tables", and a groove on the femoral head. Regardless of these hypotheses, it is clear that Nundasuchus represents a previously unknown group of reptiles with a mixture of features both plesiomorphic and derived with respect to suchian archosaurs.

== Discovery ==
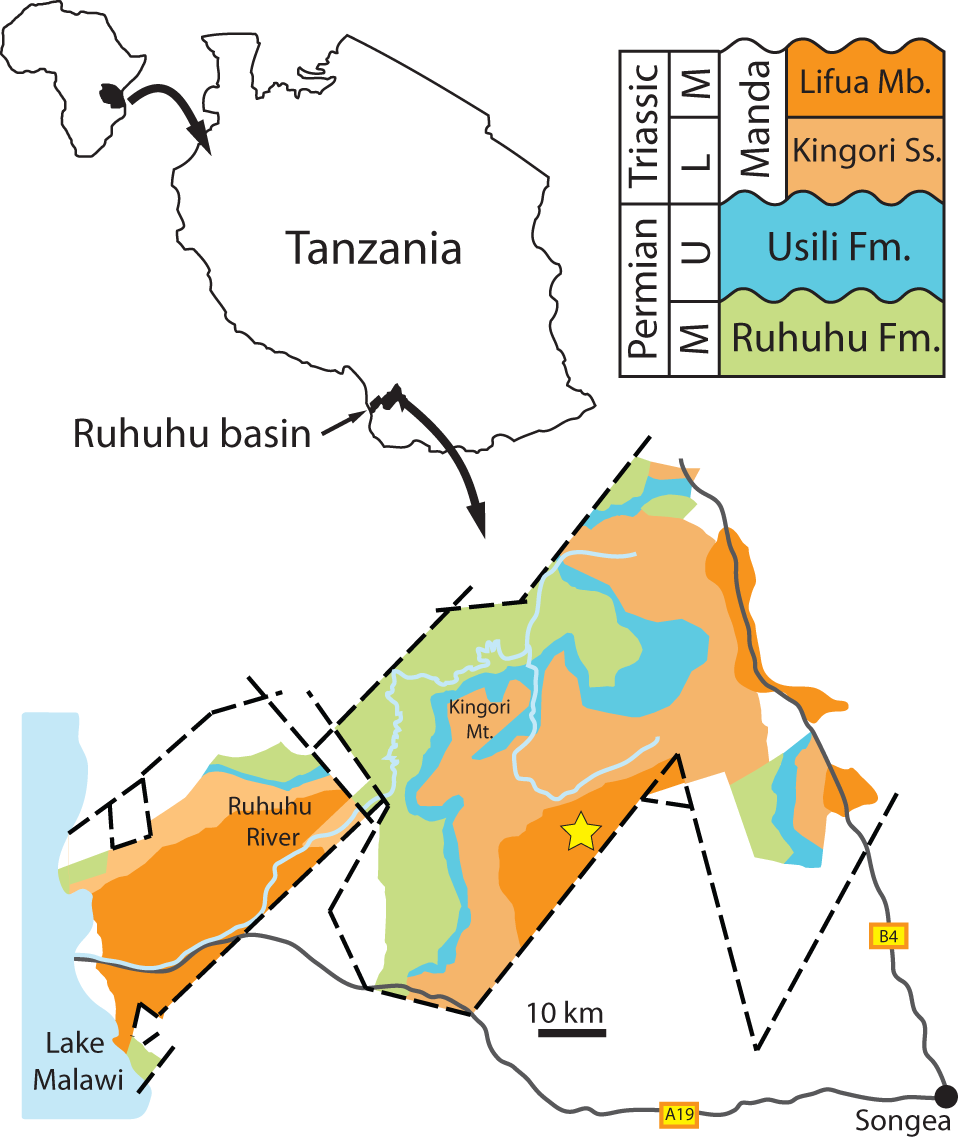
Manda beds, Ruhuhu Basin, southwestern Tanzania, where the holotype of Nundasuchus was found

Nundasuchus is known solely from the holotype NMT RB48, a partially complete disassociated and mostly disarticulated individual housed at the National Museum of Tanzania, Dar es Salaam of Tanzania. The holotype consists of a partial right pterygoid, nearly complete right dentary, the right splenial, the right surangular, and isolated teeth, as well as the following postcranial bones: a partial atlas, two articulated mid-neck vertebrae, two articulated mid-back vertebrae, the last back vertebrae, the sacrum with sacral ribs, front-most tail vertebrae, dorsal ribs, gastralia, articulated and isolated paramedian osteoderms, partial shoulder girdle including interclavicle, parts of both clavicles, complete left and right scapulae, and the right coracoid, the left humerus, both pubes, both femora, the left fibula, inner and outer ends of the left tibia, as well as the left astragalus, left calcaneum, left fourth tarsal and all but fourth metatarsals, and outer ends of right third-to-fifth metatarsals, numerous isolated phalanges, a partial ungual and many other fragments.

NMTRB48 was discovered by Dr. Sterling Nesbitt in 2007 at an isolated outcrop approximately 100 square meters in area known as locality Z41, along with remains of other archosaurs and rhynchosaurs. Another locality (Z42) occurs in the immediate vicinity, and yielded four cynodonts including two unnamed forms, Scalenodon attridgei and Mandagomphodon hirschsoni, four dicynodonts including Tetragonias njalilus, Sangusaurus parringtonii, Angonisaurus cruickshanki, and Rechnisaurus cristarhynchus, and the archosauromorphs Stenaulorhynchus stockleyi and Asilisaurus kongwe. These localities, located between the Ndatira and Njalila rivers, belong to the fluviolacustrine mudstone-sandstone sequence in the middle of the Lifua Member of the Manda beds of Ruhuhu Basin in Tanzania. Based on comparison with the better studied tetrapod fauna of Subzone C of the Cynognathus Assemblage Zone of South Africa, this member is considered to date to the Anisian stage of the early Middle Triassic.

== Description ==
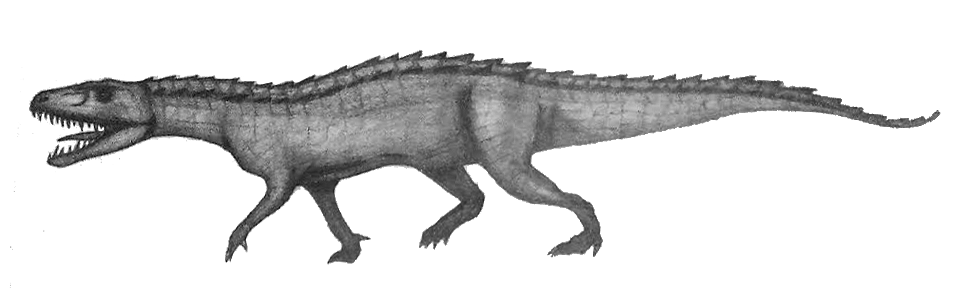
Pencil sketch of Nundasuchus songeaensis

=== Skull ===
Skull material is very limited for Nundasuchus; only a right lower jaw and a right pterygoid bone (which formed part of the roof of the mouth) were preserved in the holotype. However, even these fragments are informative. The pterygoid is convex when seen from above and concave from below. This ventral (lower) concavity manifests in the form of a deep depression bounded by posterior (rear) and medial (inner) ridges. The portion of the pterygoid which would have been positioned along the midline of the palate is unusual compared to other archosaurs due to possessing teeth. These teeth were small and rounded, placed in three rows parallel to the midline of the mouth. Pterygoid teeth are typically absent in archosaurs, although a few avemetatarsalians (Eudimorphodon, Eoraptor, Eodromaeus) and another likely pseudosuchian (Turfanosuchus) are known to have possessed them.

The jaw is typical compared to that of most carnivorous archosaurs, being low and long, with serrated, knife-like teeth set in deep sockets. At least 14 teeth were present, with the teeth at the middle of the jaw (around tooth nine) being smaller than those at the front and rear of the jaw. The lower edge of the lateral (outer) side of the jaw was covered in small longitudinal grooves, a feature seemingly unique to Nundasuchus among early archosaurs. Less unusual is the presence of several rows of pits on the lateral surface and large grooves on the medial surface. The surangular bone at the back of the jaw forms a deeply concave jaw joint preceded by a longitudinal ridge (unique to the genus) and followed by a large, vertically-oriented plate of bone.

=== Vertebrae and osteoderms ===
The two incompletely preserved cervical (neck) vertebrae were amphicoelous (concave from both the front and the rear), with a large lateral pit near the base of the neural arch. The concave pleurapophyses (lower rib facets) were near the lower front edge of the vertebrae, while the convex diapophyses (upper rib facets) were positioned higher up. The lower edge of each vertebra possessed a large keel which was deepest towards the rear. Isolated cervical neural spines were similar to those of Batrachotomus, being expanded towards their upper front tips into heart-shaped structures when seen from above.

Most of the dorsal (back) vertebrae were tall and amphicoelous, and possessed a pair of ventral keels adjacent to the midline, separated by a shallow groove. These ventral keels are similar to those of the unusual aquatic archosauriform Vancleavea, although not as pronounced. Considering that Nundasuchus is not closely related to Vancleavea, its ventral keels were probably an example of convergent evolution, and they can be considered a unique trait compared to other archosaurs. The rib facets were short, positioned high on the vertebrae at the base of the neural arches. Three ridges radiate outwards from each diapophysis; one connects to the parapophysis, another connects to the main body of the vertebra, and the last one reaches the postzygapophyses (rear vertebral joints). One notable feature of the vertebrae of Nundasuchus is the possible presence of hyposphene-hypantrum articulations, as reported by the original description. However, a 2018 study doubted this interpretation, arguing that the supposed articulations were actually misidentified components of the zygapophyses. As with the cervicals, the neural spines of the dorsal vertebrae expand outwards into flat structures sometimes called "spine tables". Some dorsals near the hip lose the characteristic ventral keel, instead acquiring additional pits near the rib facets.

The sacrum was probably formed by two unfused vertebrae, connected to massive sacral ribs. The rib facets are huge in conjunction with the sacral ribs, but not large enough to annihilate the pits at the base of the neural arch. Each rib facet of the first sacral vertebra had a distinct upper and lower connection to the trumpet-shaped first sacral rib. The second sacral rib is flatter, and tilts diagonally so that its tapering rear edge is positioned higher than its front edge. A groove is present along the outer edge of this rib, roughly where it would connect to the ilium. The sacrum in general is similar to that of the rauisuchid Stagonosuchus, except for having thinner neural spines.

The caudals (tail vertebrae) near the hip were tall and generally similar to the dorsals, except that their zygapophyses were inclined upwards at a higher angle. Further down the tail, they acquire chevrons and fuse to the caudal ribs, as well as becoming smaller and simpler in general. The dorsal ribs were two-headed, with concave and convex joints corresponding to the convex and concave rib facets of the vertebrae. They were flattened near the vertebrae, and at their tips they had small facets for attachment to the densely packed gastralia (belly ribs).

Several groups of osteoderms (plate-like bony scutes) were also preserved in Nundasuchus. Individual osteoderms were lightly ornamented and heart- or leaf-shaped, with rounded edges and tapering front tips. They are similar to those of most other pseudosuchians as well as archosaur relatives such as Euparkeria, but are less elongated than those of some of these taxa, instead being about as wide as they are long. Most of the osteoderms referred to Nundasuchus are thin bones, with sharply pointed front tips, a thin longitudinal ridge, and a fair amount of overlap. A rare "thick" morphotype is also present, with less overlap, a small and mound-like ridge, and more rounded front tips. At least the "thin"-type osteoderms formed several longitudinal rows stretching along the backbone of the animal. When seen from above, these rows would not have been symmetrical on each side of the animal. Instead, they were "staggered", with the left and right rows slightly offset from each other. An estimated five osteoderms were present per every two vertebrae.

=== Pectoral girdle and forelimbs ===
The scapula (shoulder blade) was paddle-like and somewhat small. The lower portion of the scapula is where the glenoid (shoulder socket) is located, pointing backwards from the rear edge of the bone. This general area is the widest part of the bone when seen head-on, and underlies the thinnest part when seen from the side. Directly above the glenoid lies a small pit, likely the origin point of the triceps muscle. Meanwhile, the front edge of the scapula has a distinct ridge, probably the acromion process. The scapula of Nundasuchus differs from advanced pseudosuchians due to its small triceps pit, but also from phytosaurs due to its distinct acromion. The lower edge of the scapula connects to the semicircular coracoid bone. The rear portion of the coracoid extends back and curves upwards to form the lower half of the glenoid, but is not offset from the socket by a distinct notch. However, a wide groove is present below the glenoid when seen from the side, similar to the case in aetosaurs and Postosuchus. In front of the glenoid, a hole known as the coracoid foramen pierces the coracoid, and, in a feature unique to Nundasuchus, this hole is surrounded by several knob-like structures. Other fragments of the pectoral girdle, such as an interclavicle and clavicles, are also preserved. They are covered in grooves, with thin, blade-like edges. The interclavicle is spoon-shaped, concave from above and convex from below, although its true shape is unknown due to the rear portion being broken off. Overall it is more similar to those of paracrocodylomorphs rather than phytosaurs.

The only portion of the forelimb known for this genus was the humerus (upper arm bone). Its medial edge was concave while the lateral edge was almost straight as in phytosaurs. In conjunction with this, the deltopectoral crest (a large flattened structure near the humeral head) is oriented more anteriorly than laterally. Both the humeral head and the tip of the lower extremity of the bone were covered with deep grooves. Just above the lower extremity was a depression, and just lateral to this depression was a distinct ectepicondylar groove.

=== Pelvic girdle and hindlimbs ===
The only preserved part of the pelvic girdle (hip), not counting the sacrum, was the left pubis bone. This bone was characteristically small in Nundasuchus, only about 30% the length of the femur. This is comparable to phytosaurs, aetosaurs, and early avemetatarsalians, but in contrast to the condition in other archosaurs. The areas where the pubis would have contacted other bones of the hip are broken, but evidently the pubis did possess features such as an inset obturator foramen and an insertion for the ambiens muscle under the acetabulum (hip socket). The main shaft of the pubis is not strongly expanded in most directions, but the medial edge has a plate-like inner extension known as a pubic apron, which would have contacted the corresponding extension on the right pubis. This pubic apron is convex when seen from the front.

The femur (thigh bone) is sigmoidal (S-shaped), with the femoral head being twisted slightly inwards and the distal condyles being twisted slightly outwards. This creates an angle of 45 degrees between these two extremities of the bone, as with most eucrocopodans apart from dinosaurs. As with other eucrocopodans, the femoral head has several distinct tubera (bumps), one on the anterolateral surface of the bone and another on the posteromedial surface. Nundasuchus also may have had a third tuber on the medial surface of the head as in archosaurs, but this portion of the bone is damaged so it cannot be assessed with certainty. The femoral head also has a groove on its upper surface, similar to paracrocodylomorphs. Further down the posteromedial face of the shaft is a long, sharp ridge known as the fourth trochanter. About 40% down the front part of the shaft is a tuber covered with grooves. This bump was likely an attachment point for the iliofemoralis muscle which helped to stabilize the hip. The distal part of the femur has a large crista tibiofibularis, an upper extension of the lateral condyle. Both the crista and the medial condyle are large, and taper into rounded apices. In addition, the lateral and medial condyles each have a small depression at their extemities, with that of the medial condyle likely corresponding to the femorotibialis muscle.

The proximal part of the tibia (inner shin bone) is roughly diamond-shaped in cross section, with rounded lateral and medial tubera as well as a low and indistinct forward-pointing ridge known as a cnemial crest. The lateral tuber is larger and more concave, like that of ornithosuchids. Apart from these tubera, the proximal part of the tibia is mostly convex. However, a distinct notch is present behind the lateral tuber. This is probably an attachment point for flexor tibialis internus muscle. The distal part is smooth and oval-shaped in cross section and 'flexed' when seen from behind. The fibula (outer shin bone) is sigmoidal, with a flattened medial surface, a large crest for the iliofibularis muscle on the lateral surface, and a distal face which tilts forwards.

The foot consisted of five metatarsals attached to phalanges (toe bones). The smallest metatarsal was the innermost one (I), with metatarsal II being longer and III being longer than either. Although metatarsal IV is incomplete, it has been estimated to be longer than III. This would be highly unusual among Triassic reptiles, of which only Proterosuchus shares this characteristic. Metatarsal I is somewhat squashed diagonally, with the edge facing the rest of the foot being positioned higher than the inner edge. A crest is also present on the inner edge. The articulation with the ankle is convex and expanded towards the rest of the foot. Metatarsal II is parallelogram-shaped in cross section, with a 'lip' on its upper edge that accepts the first metatarsal. Metatarsal III has the largest distal joint while IV has the smallest, indicating that the third toe was more massive than the fourth. Metatarsal V is hook-shaped, with two distinct proximal articulations for the fibula and the fourth distal tarsal of the ankle. The phalanges are generally robust, but those of the fifth toe were longer and hourglass-shaped, attached to a rough-textured ungual (claw). In general, the foot bones resemble those of Prestosuchus and phytosaurs.

==== Ankle ====
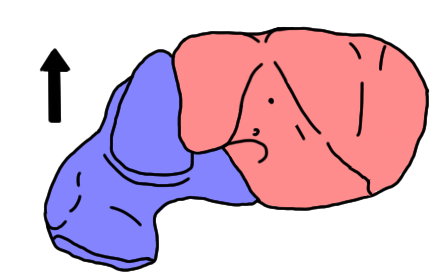
The left ankle of Nundasuchus seen in proximal view (i.e. with the tibial and fibular joints facing the viewer), with the calcaneum in blue and the astragalus in pink.

The ankle was primarily formed by two bones, the calcaneum on the outer side and the astragalus on the inner side. These bones and their joints clearly show distinguishing features of the group Crurotarsi, which includes suchians, phytosaurs, and probably avemetatarsalians. For example, the calcaneum's attachment with the astragalus is concave, and the calcaneum also has a cylindrical extension with flared edges, known as a calcaneal tuber. The calcaneal tuber is directed about 45 degrees between sideways and backwards, similar to phytosaurs and non-archosaurian eucrocopodans, but in contrast to most other suchians, which have calcaneal tubera oriented more backwards. On the other hand, the length of the calcaneal tuber is moderate, similar to that of typical pseudosuchians rather than the much more elongated structure of phytosaurs. The lateral side of the tuber has a noticeable 'pad', which is seemingly unique to Nundasuchus. The upper surface for the calcaneum connects to the fibula with a convex, barrel-shaped joint. This is also similar to phytosaurs and suchians but in contrast to ornithosuchids, where this joint is more dome-like. Both the fibular and astragalar facets of the calcaneum are a continuous surface, a condition unlike suchians.

The upper surface of the astragalus has a triangular facet for the fibula as well as a larger, oval-shaped facet for the tibia. The tibial facet is divided into two basins by a low convexity, although this flexion is somewhat indistinct compared to that of suchians and avemetatarsalians. The calcaneal facet comes in the form of a flat surface overlying a convex 'peg', a feature characteristic of crurotarsal joints. The peg is poorly developed, more similar to that of phytosaurs rather than other suchians. The front edge of the astragalus has a large concave surface (astragalar hollow) overlying a small convexity (astragalar ball). The astragalar ball is approximately as well developed as that of the aetosaur Longosuchus.

== Etymology ==
Nundasuchus was first described and named by Sterling J. Nesbitt, Christian A. Sidor, Kenneth D. Angielczyk, Roger M. H. Smith and Linda A. Tsuji in 2014 and the type species is Nundasuchus songeaensis. The generic name is derived from Swahili Language nunda meaning "predator", plus suchus from Greek soukhos, an Egyptian crocodile god. The new specific name refers to the provincial capital of Songea, located near to the collection locality of the remains, as indicated by the Latin suffix -ensis, meaning "from".

== Classification ==
The original description of Nundasuchus, Nesbitt et al. (2014), tested its phylogenetic position using the two most comprehensive early archosaur phylogenetic datasets available. The first dataset used was a version of Brusatte et al.'s 2010 archosaur phylogeny which had been updated by Butler et al. (2011) during a study on the anatomy of Ctenosauriscus. The second dataset was a more comprehensive and widely accepted study on archosaur relationships created by Nesbitt in 2011. Both analyses found that Nundasuchus was a pseudosuchian, meaning that it was an archosaur more closely related to crocodilians than it was to dinosaurs. This identification was primarily based on traits of the ankle which were shared between Nundasuchus and pseudosuchians. The Brusatte et al.(2010) dataset placed it as the most basal pseudosuchian (although the name "Crurotarsi" was used for the group), less crownward (further from crocodilians) than even the phytosaurs.

Nesbitt et al. (2014)'s application of the Nesbitt (2011) dataset placed Nundasuchus more crownward, compared to its position in Brusatte et al.'s results. Nesbitt (2011) considered crocodylomorphs (crocodilian ancestors) to have been descended from taxa traditionally identified as "rauisuchians". Since Rauisuchia typically omits crocodylomorphs and would therefore be paraphyletic with his results, Nesbitt decided to scrap the name, replacing it with the monophyletic clade Paracrocodylomorpha. This clade itself is allied with the Swiss suchian Ticinosuchus based primarily on similarities of the ischium. When Nundasuchus was added into the dataset, it was placed as the sister taxon to the Ticinosuchus + Paracrocodylomorpha clade. This was justified by three traits: heart-shaped "spine tables", a groove on the proximal side of the femoral head, and "staggered" osteoderms.

Nesbitt et al. (2014) questioned these results due to the fact that Nundasuchus possesses many plesiomorphic archosaurian traits (i.e. typical for very basal archosaurs) that appear to be autapomorphies (unique features), if it is truly a member of Pseudosuchia. These include palatal teeth, a short pubis, and a calcaneal tuber which is not as strongly deflected backwards. Thus, they performed further analyses under certain relationship constraints, such as forcing Nundasuchus to be outside Archosauria or closer to Phytosauria. These analyses revealed little change in the relationships (apart from the constraints themselves), but major changes to the traits associated with these relationships, changing the traits that were considered to diagnose Pseudosuchia, Archosauria, and other clades. Therefore, it is not clear whether Nundasuchus is a suchian that has convergences with far more basal archosaurs as the two phylogenetic analyses suggest, or an archosauriform closely related to Archosauria, with features convergent to the morphology of the more advanced paracrocodylomorphs. However, support for the placement of Nundasuchus does weaken the further away it is placed from Paracrocodylomorpha. The results of the unconstrained analysis of Nesbitt et al. (2014) using the Nesbitt (2011) dataset are simplified below (the relations within bolded clades are not shown).

- Archosauriformes
  - Proterosuchus
  - - Erythrosuchus
    - - Vancleavea
      - - **Proterochampsia**
        - - Euparkeria
          - - **Phytosauria**
            - Archosauria
              - **Avemetatarsalia**
              - Pseudosuchia
                - **Ornithosuchidae**
                - Suchia
                  - Gracilisuchus
                  - Turfanosuchus
                  - - Revueltosaurus
                    - **Aetosauria**
                  - - **Nundasuchus**
                    - - Ticinosuchus
                      - Paracrocodylomorpha
                        - Poposauroidea
                          - Qianosuchus
                          - - **Ctenosauriscidae**
                            - - Poposaurus
                              - - Lotosaurus
                                - **Shuvosauridae**
                        - Loricata
                          - Prestosuchus
                          - - Saurosuchus
                            - - Batrachotomus
                              - - Fasolasuchus
                                - - **Rauisuchidae**
                                  - **Crocodylomorpha**

In 2016, Nundasuchus was featured in Martin Ezcurra's study of archosauromorphs, and was placed into a phylogenetic analysis similar is size and scope to Nesbitt (2011). Contrary to the results of Nesbitt et al. (2014), Ezcurra (2016) placed Nundasuchus as a basal pseudosuchian, although not quite as basal as Phytosauria. He also discussed the three features which those authors used to justify placement of Nundasuchus near Paracrocodylomorpha. Heart-shaped spine tables, for example, were considered to have had an erratic distribution within Pseudosuchia, with some taxa (such as gracilisuchids) lacking them and others (i.e. phytosaurs and Batrachotomus) having them in only certain vertebrae. Likewise, staggered dorsal osteoderms were only found to be present in Nundasuchus and Gracilisuchus, with none of the sampled paracrocodylomorphs sharing the trait. He did concede that a groove on the femoral head is consistent with the hypothesis of Nundasuchus being close to paracrocoylomorphs, as the trait is also found in Prestosuchus and Batrachotomus.

However, Ezcurra also admitted that his analysis was more focused on basal archosauromorphs and archosauriforms rather than true archosaurs, and therefore it may not be completely accurate for crownward groups such as pseudosuchians. He noted that certain taxa crucial to Nesbitt (2011)'s results, such as Ticinosuchus and Saurosuchus, were omitted from his study. These genera were paracrocodyomorphs which possessed staggered osteoderms, heart-shaped spine tables, and a groove on the femoral head, therefore justifying a close relationship to Nundasuchus. In 2018, another early paracrocodylomorph, Mandasuchus, received a long-awaited formal description. This genus also had these three features identified by Nesbitt et al. (2014). A phylogenetic analysis was included in the description, based primarily on Nesbitt (2011) but also including new data from the Nundasuchus description as well as a recent study on gracilisuchids. The results found that either Nundasuchus or gracilisuchids were the sister taxa to Paracrocodylomorpha+Ticinosuchus, although it could not precisely determine which one was closer.

An updated version of the Nesbitt (2011) dataset published by Da-Silva et al. (2018) placed Nundasuchus at the base of Pseudosuchia. This study incorporated many recent revisions and additions to Nesbitt's methodology, though its results more closely resembled those of Ezcurra (2016) rather than Nesbitt (2014).
