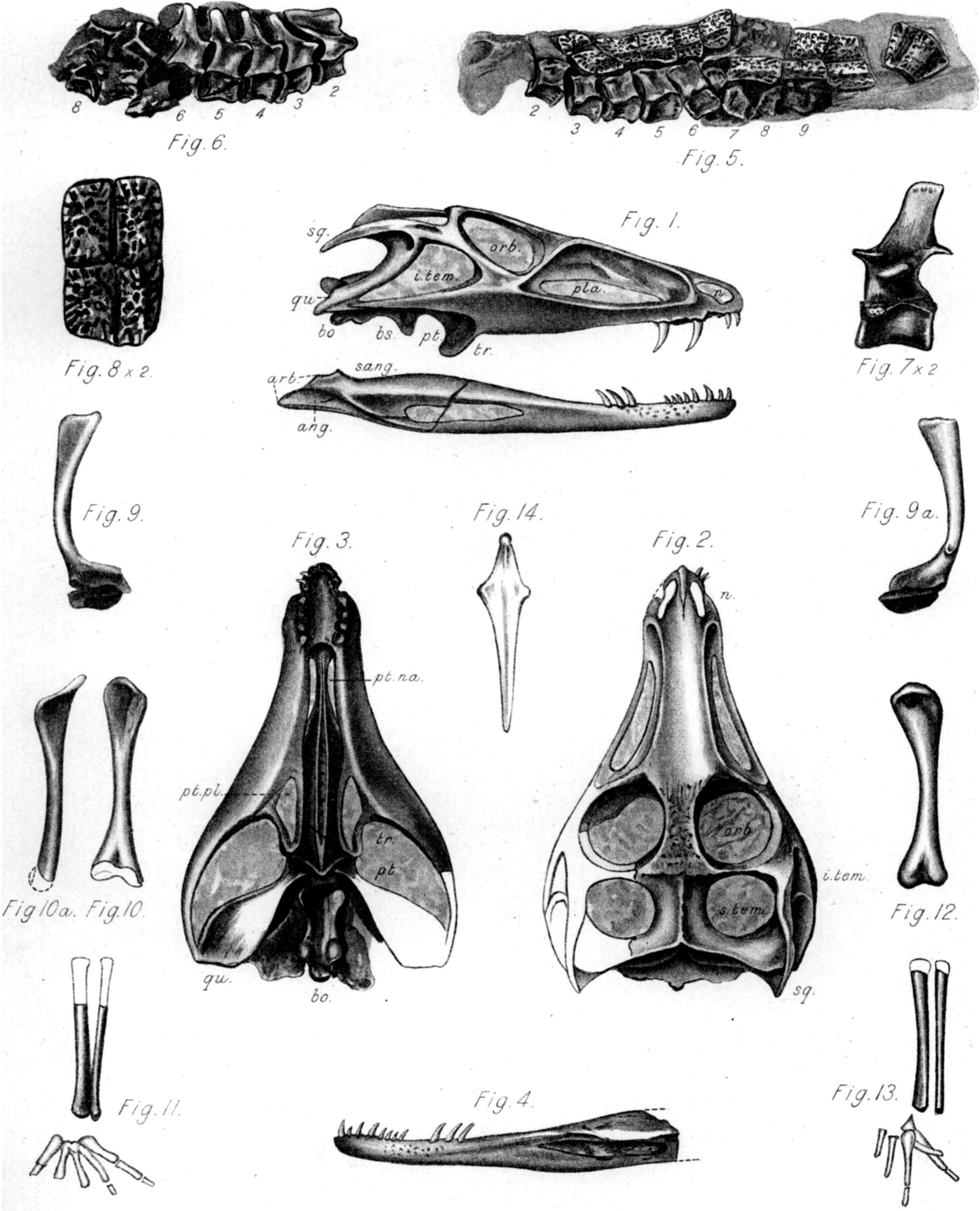
- Fossils described in 1894
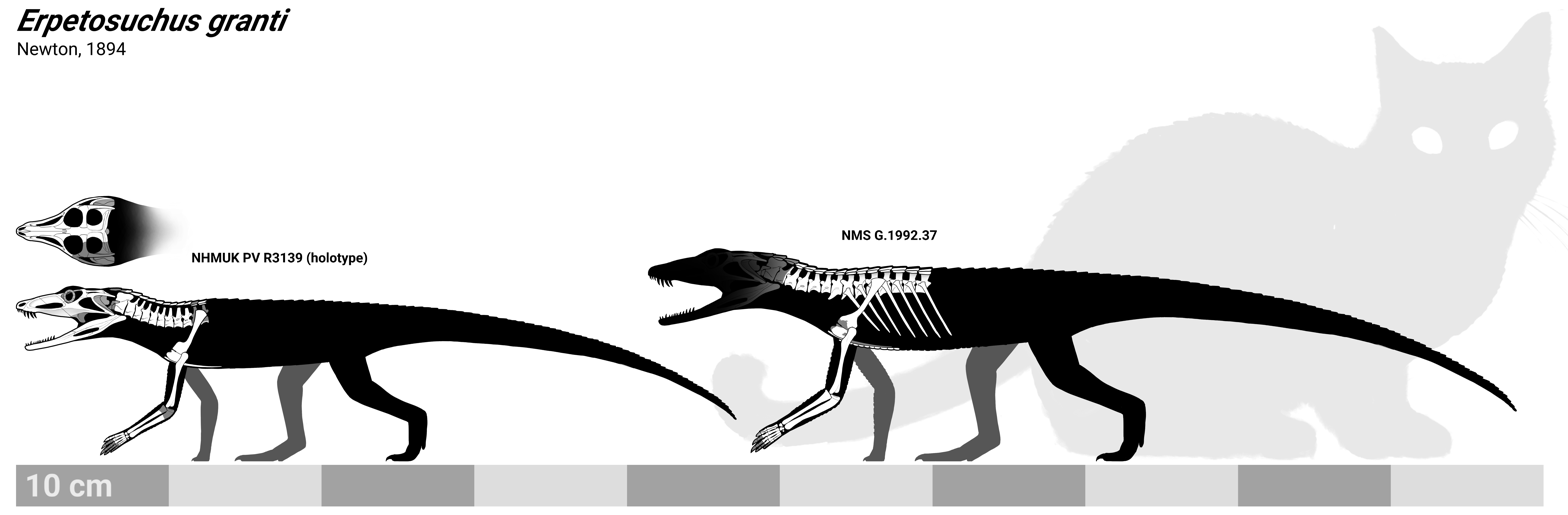
- Skeletal reconstruction and size comparison of the holotype and a referred specimen

Scientific classification
- Kingdom: Animalia
- Phylum: Chordata
- Class: Reptilia
- Clade: Archosauria
- Clade: Pseudosuchia
- Clade: Suchia
- Family: †Erpetosuchidae
- Genus: †Erpetosuchus; Newton, 1894

Species
- †E. granti Newton, 1894 (type)

= Erpetosuchus =

Erpetosuchus Temporal range: Late Triassic 237–208.5 Ma

Extinct genus of reptiles

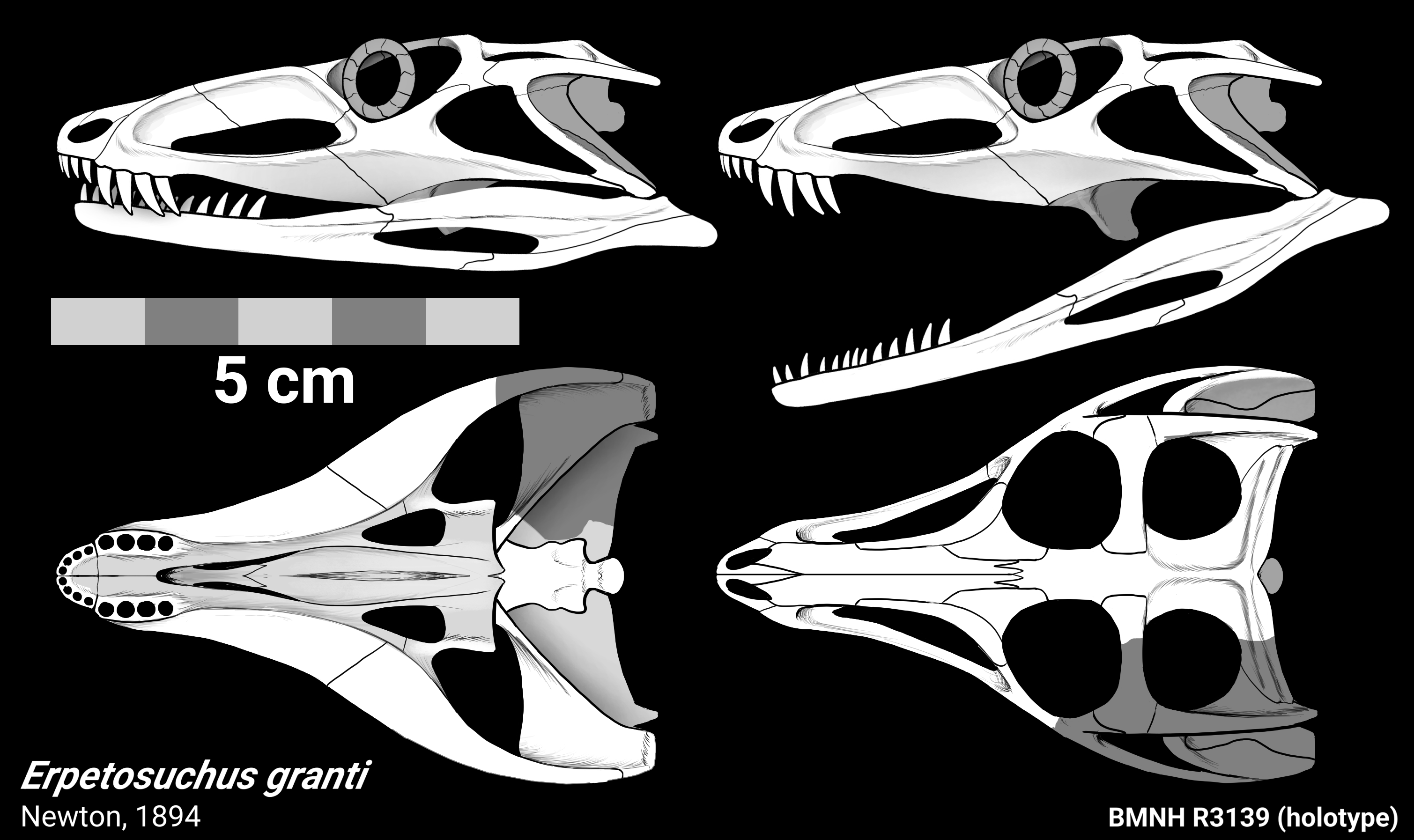
Skull diagram of the holotype in different views

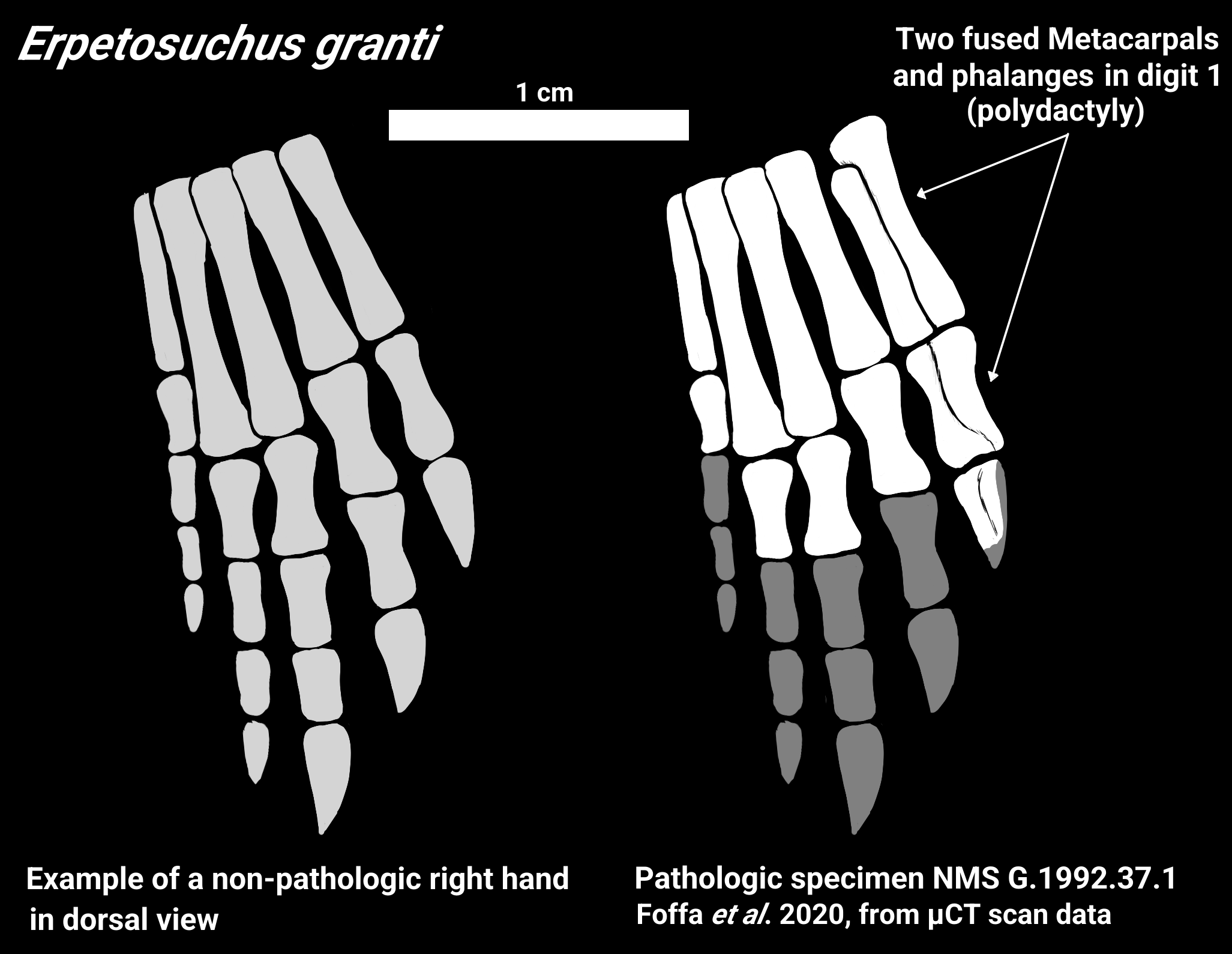
One of the known specimens of Erpetosuchus showcases polydactyly

Erpetosuchus is an extinct genus of pseudosuchian from the Late Triassic. The type species of Erpetosuchus is E. granti. It was first described by E. T. Newton in 1894 for remains found in northeastern Scotland, including four specimens from the latest Carnian Lossiemouth Sandstone Formation. Additional remains of Erpetosuchus have been found in the New Haven Formation of Connecticut in the eastern United States, although they were not attributed to the species E. granti. The relationship of Erpetosuchus to other archosaurs is uncertain. In 2000 and 2002, it was considered a close relative of the group Crocodylomorpha, which includes living crocodylians and many extinct relatives. However, this relationship was questioned in a 2012 analysis that found the phylogenetic placement of Erpetosuchus to be very uncertain.

== Discovery ==
Life restoration

The first remains of Erpetosuchus were found in the Lossiemouth Sandstone Formation in Scotland, dating back to the late Carnian stage of the Late Triassic. The holotype specimen is BMNH R3139 and consists of a skull and a partial postcranial skeleton.

During a field trip in 1995 to the lower part of the New Haven Formation in Connecticut, American palaeontologist Paul E. Olsen discovered a partial skull that, after preparation and description in 2000 (Olsen et al. 2000), was referable to Erpetosuchus. This was the first record of Erpetosuchus outside Scotland. The specimen has been given the number AMNH 29300, and besides the right side of the skull, also has some vertebrae and indeterminate bones associated. Dating of the lower portion of the New Haven Formation indicates a Norian age.

== Classification ==
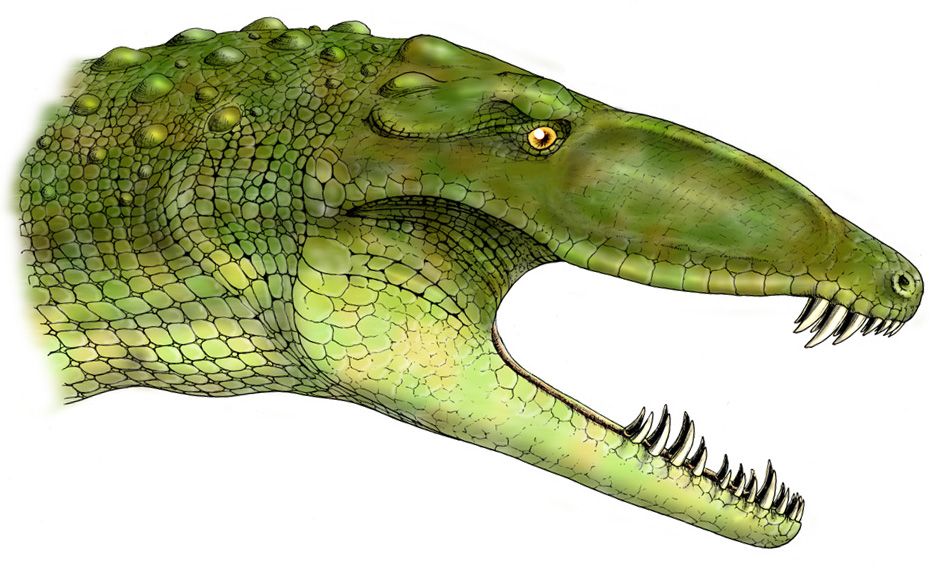
Restoration of the head

Erpetosuchus granti was originally assigned to Thecodontia, but that name is no longer considered valid in scientific literature because it is a paraphyletic group of early archosaurs.

A more recent phylogenetic analysis by Olsen et al. (2000) found E. granti to be the sister-taxon to the Crocodylomorpha. These were united in a clade by the following synapomorphies:

- Medial contact of the maxillae (upper jaw bones) to form a secondary bony palate
- Absence of a postfrontal bone at the top of the skull
- Parietal bones fused without a trace of a suture between them

Benton and Walker (2002) found the same sister-group relationship and proposed the name Bathyotica for the clade containing Erpetosuchus and Crocodylomorpha.

Nesbitt and Butler (2012) included Erpetosuchus within a more comprehensive phylogenetic analysis and found it to group with the archosaur Parringtonia from the Middle Triassic of Tanzania. Both were part of the clade Erpetosuchidae. Nesbitt and Butler did not find support for the sister-group relationship between Erpetosuchus and Crocodylomorpha. Instead, erpetosuchids formed a polytomy or unresolved evolutionary relationship at the base of Archosauria along with several other groups. It could take many positions within Archosauria, but none were as a sister taxon of Crocodylomorpha.
