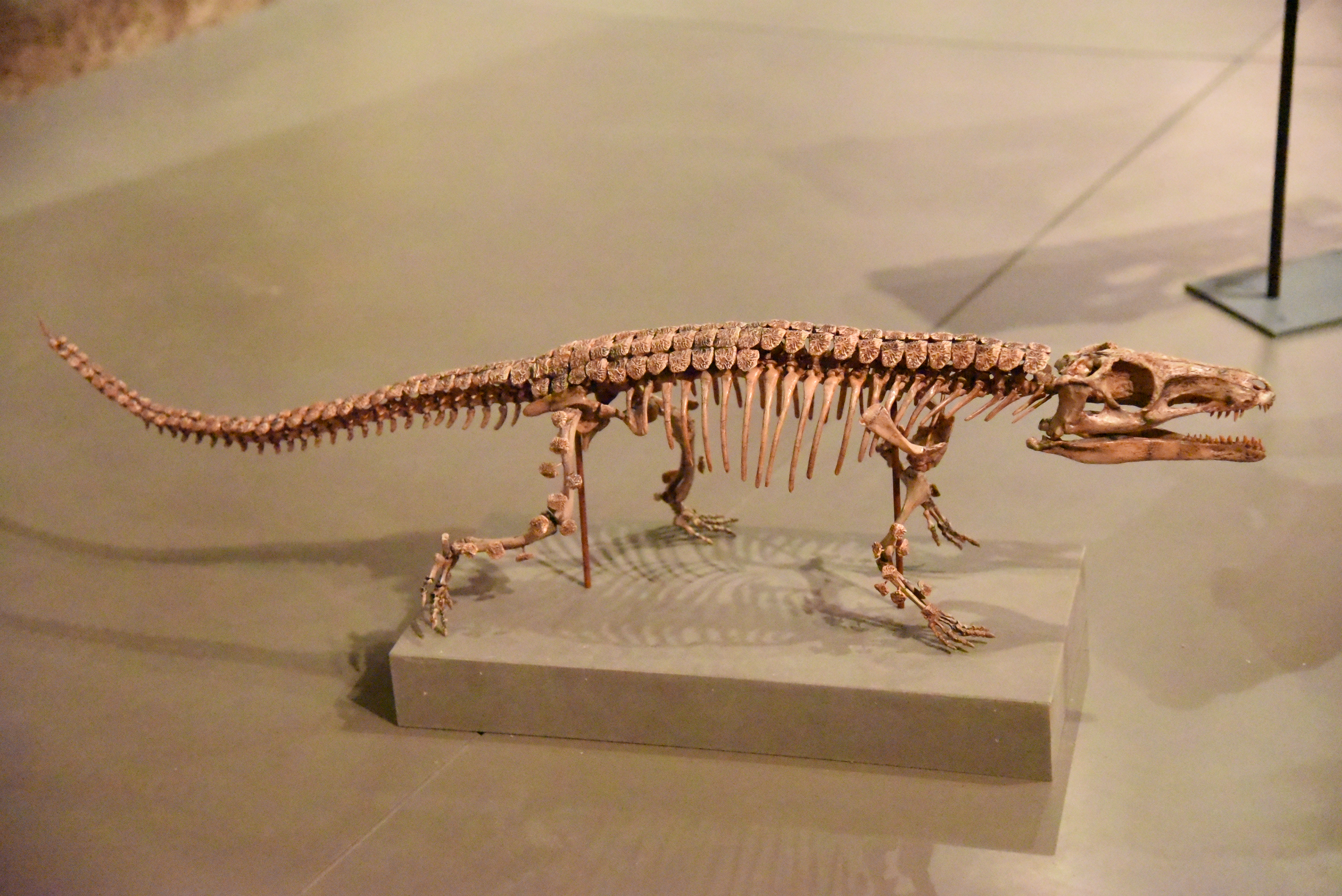

Scientific classification
- Kingdom: Animalia
- Phylum: Chordata
- Class: Reptilia
- Clade: Archosauria
- Clade: Pseudosuchia
- Family: †Erpetosuchidae
- Genus: †Parringtonia; Huene, 1939

Type species
- †Parringtonia gracilis Huene, 1939

= Parringtonia =

Parringtonia Temporal range: Anisian ~247–242 Ma

Extinct genus of reptiles

Parringtonia is an extinct genus of Triassic archosaur within the family Erpetosuchidae, known from the type species Parringtonia gracilis. It is known from a single specimen, NHMUK R8646, found from the Anisian-age Manda Formation of Tanzania. This specimen, like most archosaur material from the Manda Formation, is fragmentary, including only a maxilla and a few postcranial bones. They show similarities with those of another archosaur called Erpetosuchus, known from the Middle Triassic of Scotland and the eastern United States. The phylogenetic placement of Parringtonia and Erpetosuchus are uncertain; some studies placed them close to the group Crocodylomorpha, which includes all modern crocodylians and many extinct forms that diversified after the Triassic, but this relationship has more recently been questioned.

== Description ==
NHMUK R8646 consists of a right maxilla or upper jaw bone, a left scapula or shoulder blade, part of what might be the ischium bone of the pelvis, five complete and four partial dorsal vertebrae, three caudal vertebrae, and five osteoderms. Some vertebrae show suture lines where different parts have begun to fuse, indicating that the individual was immature when it died. NHMUK R8646 most closely resembles the bones of Erpetosuchus granti from Scotland and Erpetosuchus sp. from the eastern United States. The teeth are restricted to the front half of the maxillae in Parringtonia and Erpetosuchus, and the back of the maxilla is thicker than it is tall. Parringtonia has five tooth sockets, Erpetosuchus granti only four, and Erpetosuchus sp. six or more. Unlike Erpetosuchus, Parringtonia has a foramen or hole on the outer surface of the maxilla. The scapula of Parringtonia differs in that it has a small bump or tubercle over its shoulder socket. Both Parringtonia and Erpetosuchus have a groove that runs along the top of the neural arch of each vertebra.

== Classification and phylogeny ==
When first described by Friedrich von Huene in 1939, Parringtonia was assigned to a group called Pseudosuchia, which included crocodile-like Triassic archosaurs (although the name has recently been reinstated for the clade including all crocodile-line archosaurs). In 1970 and 1976, Parringtonia was referred to the family Erpetosuchidae because of similarities between its scapula and that of the better known Erpetosuchus. In both genera, the scapula is very thin and forward-curving. Parringtonia and Erpetosuchus are similar in size, and the osteoderms of both genera are similar in shape and sculpture. However, the osteoderms of Parringtonia are comparable to a number of other small archosaurs and cannot diagnose it as an erpetosuchid alone. Since Parringtonia lacks all of the autapomorphies or unique characteristics of Erpetosuchus including an otic notch at the back of the skull and a large antorbital fenestra set in a deep fossa on the snout, its classification as an erpetosuchid was tentative at first.

Parringtonia was redescribed in 2012 by Nesbitt & Butler and included in a phylogenetic analysis along with Erpetosuchus. The analysis confirmed that Parringtonia and Erpetosuchus were sister taxa in their own clade, which was designated Erpetosuchidae. Three synapomorphies or shared characteristics were identified for Erpetosuchidae: teeth restricted to the anterior half of the maxilla, a posterior half of the maxilla that is thicker than it is tall, and no tooth serrations. Other possible synapomorphies were considered tentative and not included within the analysis. Both taxa share a sharp ridge on the lateral margin of the maxilla that marks the lower extent of an opening called the antorbital fossa. Below this ridge, the external surface of the maxilla slopes inward (medially) toward the edge of the jaw. In Erpetosuchus, this medially inclined external surface of the maxilla continues back onto the jugal bone so that a large part of the external surface of the jugal faces downward. This morphology unites the North American and European specimens of Erpetosuchus with Parringtonia gracilis. Other potential synapomorphies include a hypertrophied or enlarged tuber at the bottom of the scapula that is thought to be the attachment point of the triceps brachii muscle. Unlike other archosauriforms that have a small tuber in the same location, the size of the tuber in erpetosuchids is exceptionally large in relation to the overall size of the scapula. The forward-curving scapula that was first noted in 1976 as a shared erpetosuchid feature was noted to be present in several other archosaurs such as Postosuchus kirkpatricki, reducing its utility as a synapomorphy.

While the 2012 analysis strongly supported the inclusion of Parringtonia within Erpetosuchidae, the position of Erpetosuchidae within Archosauria was uncertain. Erpetosuchidae formed a polytomy or unresolved evolutionary relationship with several other archosaur groups, including Avemetatarsalia, Ornithosuchidae, Aetosauria and Revueltosaurus, Ticinosuchus and Paracrocodylomorpha, Gracilisuchus, and Turfanosuchus. The removal of Gracilisuchus and Turfanosuchus from the analysis resulted in Erpetosuchidae nesting within the clade Suchia as the sister-taxon of Aetosauria plus Revueltosaurus clade, but not as a sister taxon of Crocodylomorpha as had previously been proposed.
