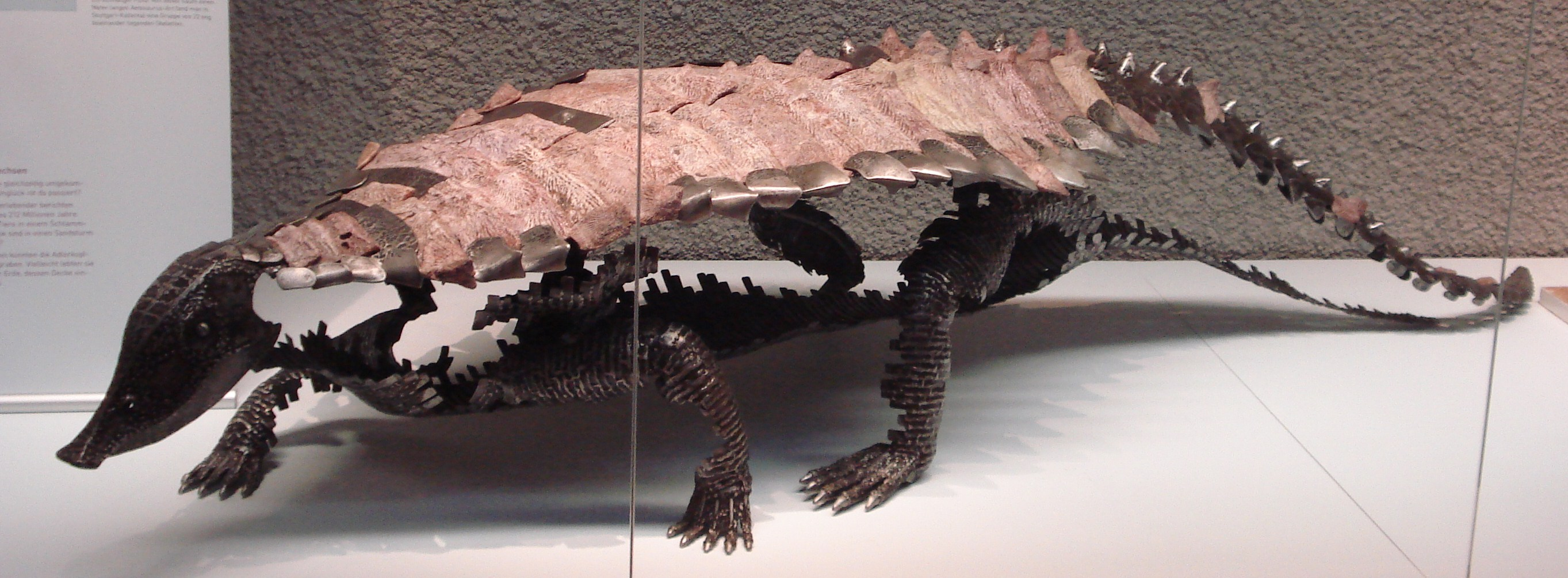
- Paratypothorax andressorum, an aetosaur
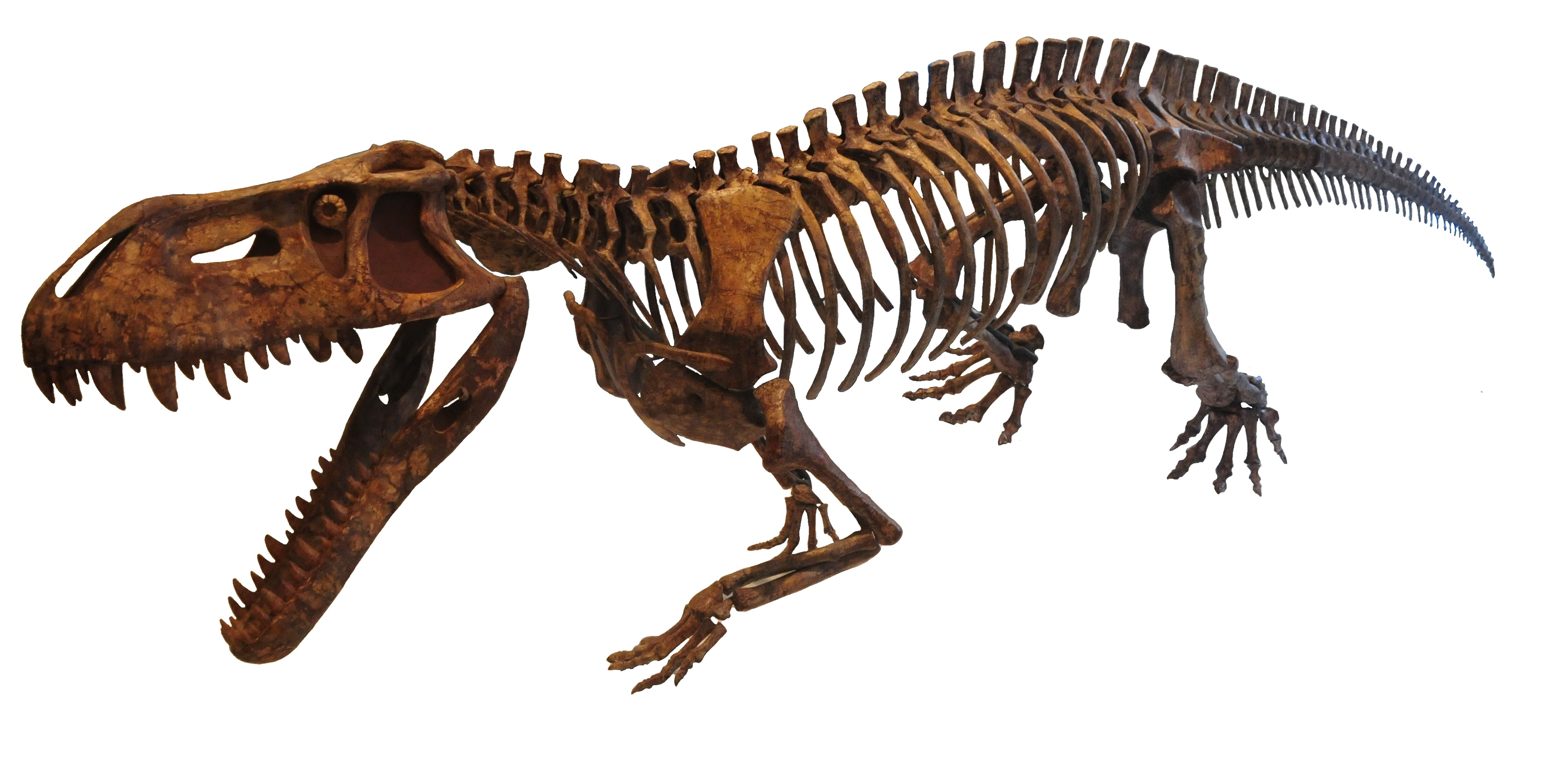
- Prestosuchus chiniquensis, an early loricatan

Scientific classification
- Kingdom: Animalia
- Phylum: Chordata
- Class: Reptilia
- Clade: Archosauria
- Clade: Pseudosuchia
- Clade: Suchia; Krebs, 1974

Subgroups
- †Koilamasuchus?; †Nundasuchus?; †Ticinosuchus; †Erpetosuchidae; †Gracilisuchidae; †Ornithosuchidae?; †Aetosauriformes; Paracrocodylomorpha

= Suchia =

Suchians Temporal range: Early Triassic - Recent, 248–0 Ma

Clade of reptiles

Suchia (from Ancient Greek σούχος (soúkhos), meaning "crocodile") is a clade of archosaurs containing the majority of pseudosuchians (crocodilians and their extinct relatives). It was defined as the least inclusive clade containing Aetosaurus ferratus, Rauisuchus tiradentes, Prestosuchus chiniquensis, and Crocodylus niloticus (the living Nile crocodile) by Nesbitt (2011). Generally the only pseudosuchian group which is omitted from Suchia is the family Ornithosuchidae, although at least one analysis classifies ornithosuchids as close relatives of erpetosuchids (which are usually considered suchians) and aetosaurs (which are suchians by definition of the group). Phytosaurs are also excluded from Suchia, although it is not certain whether they qualify as pseudosuchians in the first place.

There is some controversy over which traits, if any, can be used to distinguish suchians from non-suchian archosaurs. Anatomical features which evolve at the base of a group, and can thus be used to characterize the group, are known as synapomorphies. The two most comprehensive recent studies on archosaur relationships, Nesbitt (2011) and Ezcurra (2016), each came to different conclusions on what synapomorphies characterize Suchia. Nevertheless, they did agree on one trait that likely qualified as a synapomorphy of Suchia: a calcaneal tuber which was significantly wider than it was tall.

== Description ==
As Suchia is a clade, it is defined by relationships rather than shared characteristics between its members. However, several traits are found in most suchians but not in ornithosuchids, phytosaurs, or other archosaurs and archosaur relatives, so they can be used to help determine whether a reptile is a suchian or not. These traits are spread out throughout the body, but different paleontologists disagree on whether they were true synapomorphies (derived distinguishing features).

While Benton & Clark (1988) found numerous characteristics for the clade later renamed Suchia, Paul Sereno's 1991 study on archosaur relationships argued that many of them were also present in ornithosuchids, phytosaurs, or avemetatarsalians, so they could not be considered traits which diagnose Suchia (under his definition of the group). Instead, Sereno listed a single synapomorphy for Suchia. The postorbital-squamosal bar, which separates the upper and lower temporal fenestrae at the rear part of the skull, is short. This has the effect of making the lower temporal fenestra triangular in shape. However, Sereno also noted that this feature was not present in Prestosuchus, which he excluded from the group. Later studies found support for a placement of Prestosuchus deep within Suchia, so Sereno's synapomorphy is likely invalid.

=== Nesbitt (2011)'s synapomorphies ===
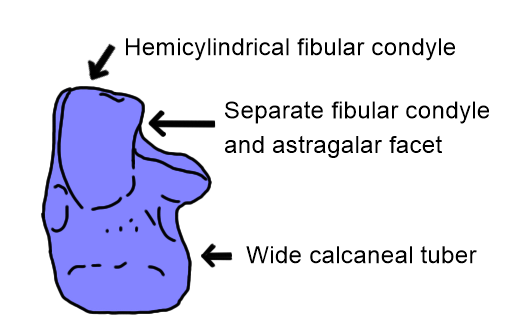
The left calcaneum (heel bone) of Batrachotomus, showing several of the calcaneal features Nesbitt (2011) considered to be synapomorphic for Suchia

Sterling Nesbitt's major 2011 analysis of early archosaurs found several more stable syapomorphies of Suchia. The jugal (cheek bone, below the eye) has a low, rounded longitudinal ridge in suchians, contrasting with other archosaurs which typically have no ridge, or a sharp ridge instead. As is the case for many early archosaurs, the structure of the calcaneum (outer heel bone) is important for diagnosing Suchia. This bone connects to both the fibula (outer shin bone) and astragalus (inner ankle bone) by means of two distinct surfaces, the convex fibular condyle and the concave astragalar facet. In other archosaurs, these surfaces are continuous, rather than separate. Moreover, the fibular condyle is hemicylindrical (half-cylinder shaped) in contrast to the more spherical structure of ornithosuchids, avemetatarsalians, and archosaur relatives such as Euparkeria and proterochampsians. A hemicylindrical fibular condyle is also present in phytosaurs, likely convergently. Lastly, the rear edge of the calcaneum has a backwards-extending tube of bone known as a calcaneal tuber. In early archosauriforms, the calcaneal tuber was taller than wide, while later archosaurs and archosaur relatives had a calcaneal tuber which was circular in cross-section. Suchians take this one step further, as early members of the group had calcaneal tubers which were much wider than tall. Although bipedal poposauroids and most loricatans (Luperosuchus and crownward) had circular calcaneal tubers, these features were likely reversions, since the earliest poposauroids (Qianosuchus, for example) and loricatans (Batrachotomus) retained wide calcaneal tubers.

Some suchians have a shallow longitudinal groove on the rear edge of the radius (inner forearm bone), although the distribution of this characteristic is poorly understood. Likewise, some early suchians have a triangular medial condyle of the femur (thigh bone), but this characteristic is also known in some archosaur relatives so it is unclear whether the presence of the trait in suchians was a synapomorphy or a plesiomorphy ("primitive" trait retained from an earlier ancestor). In addition, most loricatans reverted to the state present in other archosaurs: a rounded medial condyle. Many of Nesbitt (2011)'s suchian synapomorphies are not present in Nundasuchus, an unusual crurotarsan sometimes considered a suchian close to Ticinosuchus and Paracrocodylomorpha.

=== Ezcurra (2016)'s synapomorphies ===
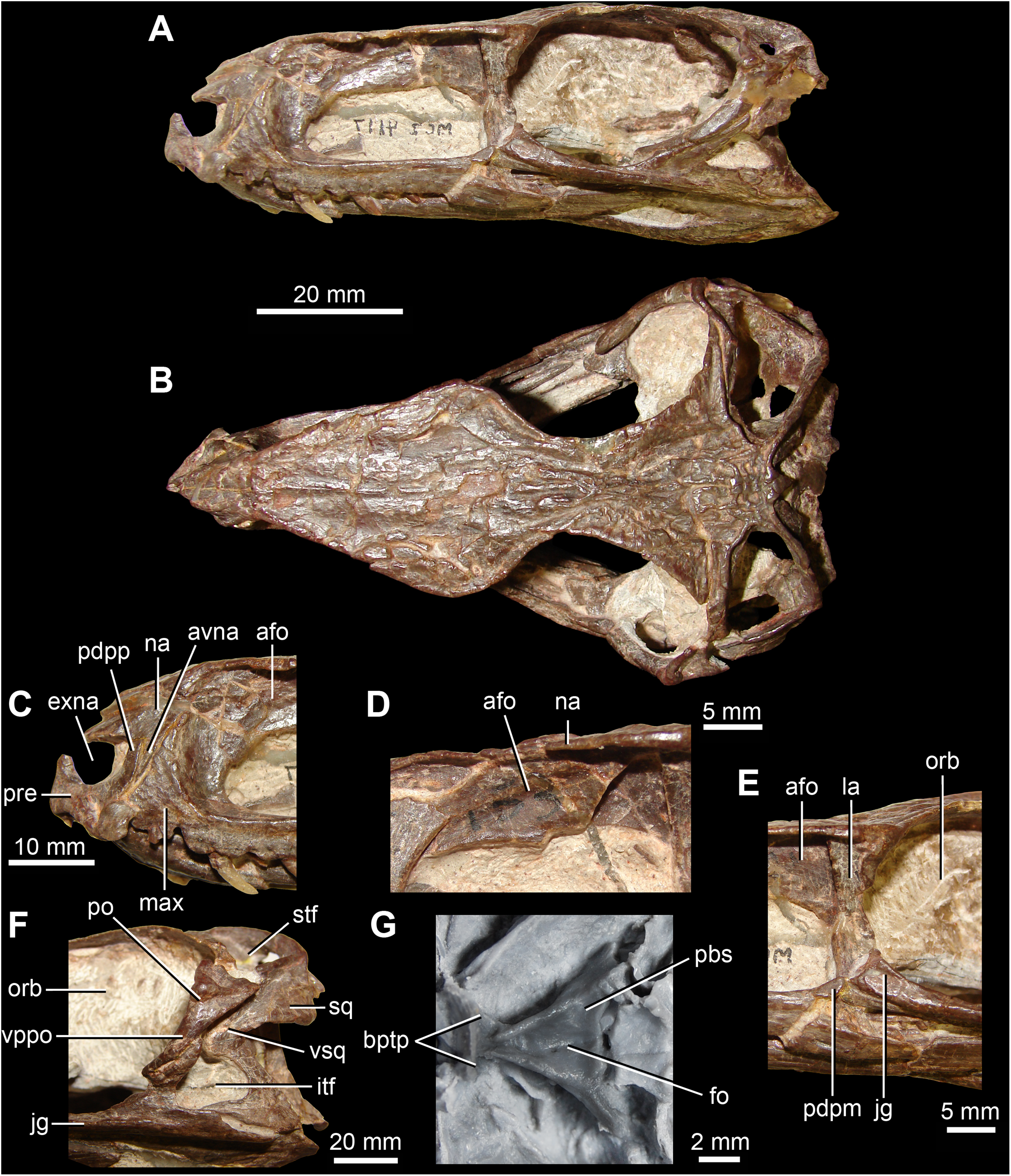
The skull of Gracilisuchus. Note the rounded ridge on the jugal bone beneath the eye (one of Nesbitt [2011]'s synapomorphies) visible in A, and the posterodorsal process of the maxilla (one of Ezcurra [2016]'s synapomorphies) visible in E (pdpm)

Martin Ezcurra's 2016 analysis of archosauromorphs provided an alternative diagnosis for Suchia. Ezcurra found that Koilamasuchus was a member of the group, but also argued that Suchia excluded Nundasuchus. As a result, his diagnosis for Suchia depended primarily on several traits visible in Koilamasuchus, which was known from significantly less fossil material than most other Suchia. These traits are the presence of large, well-rimmed pits on either side of the dorsal (back) vertebrae, a humerus (upper arm bone) which has a symmetrical proximal portion when seen from the front, and a preacetabular process (front blade) of the ilium (upper hip bone) which has a moderate length, longer than it is high, but not longer than the pubic peduncle. He also noted that in some suchians, the tip of the maxillary bone's posterior process (rear branch), near the rear lower tip of the antorbital fenestra, is actually taller than the middle portion of the rear branch. This trait, formally known as the posterodorsal process of the maxilla, has been considered a synapomorphy of gracilisuchids and is also present in aetosaurs and Qianosuchus. Despite the broad distribution of this characteristic, its absence in some suchians makes it ambiguous whether it qualifies as a synapomorphy of Suchia, or alternatively evolved in several independent lineages within the group. Ezcurra also agreed with one of Nesbitt (2011)'s synapomorphies of the calcaneum, namely the calcaneal tuber being wider than tall.

== Classification ==
Suchia was originally formalized by German paleontologist Bernard Krebs in 1974. His intention was to link the Triassic pseudosuchians (which at that time were considered to have left no descendants) with the true crocodilians that would evolve later in the Mesozoic. Suchia was named as an order united by the possession of a crurotarsal ankle, with Pseudosuchia and Crocodilia as independent suborders within it. However, newer studies starting in the 1980s have significantly altered the traditional classification scheme of crocodilian ancestors. Rather than pseudosuchians and crocodilians being sister groups as Krebs believed, the crocodilians are now considered to be a subset of Pseudosuchia. This necessitated Suchia to acquire a new definition, as Kreb's original classification scheme was invalidated.

Sereno (1991) assigned the name Suchia to a clade containing most pseudosuchians, which had previously been found by Benton & Clark (1988). Under this new definition, Suchia included Gracilisuchus stipanicicorum, Aetosauria, "Rauisuchia", Poposauridae, Crocodylomorpha, and all descendants of their common ancestor. Nesbitt (2011) altered Sereno's definition slightly, as he defined Suchia as the least inclusive clade containing Aetosaurus ferratus, Rauisuchus tiradentes, Prestosuchus chiniquensis, and Crocodylus niloticus (the living Nile crocodile). Suchia, therefore, is a node-based taxon including crocodylomorphs and several more basal Triassic pseudosuchian groups. Such groups include Gracilisuchidae, Revueltosaurus, Aetosauria, Ticinosuchus, Poposauroidea, Loricata, and possibly Erpetosuchidae, Koilamasuchus, Nundasuchus, and/or Euscolosuchus.

Taxa used by Nesbitt (2011) to define Suchia
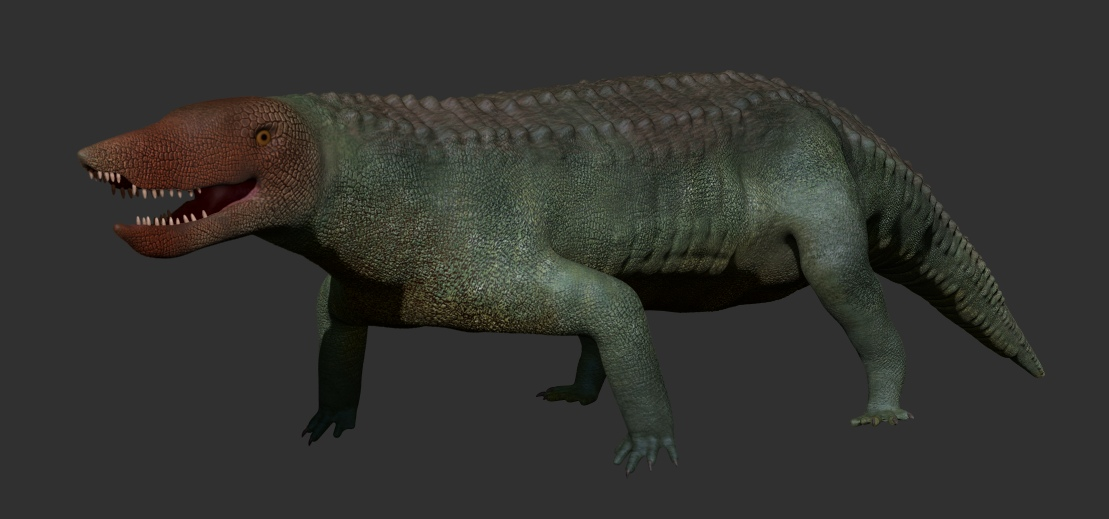
Aetosaurus ferratus

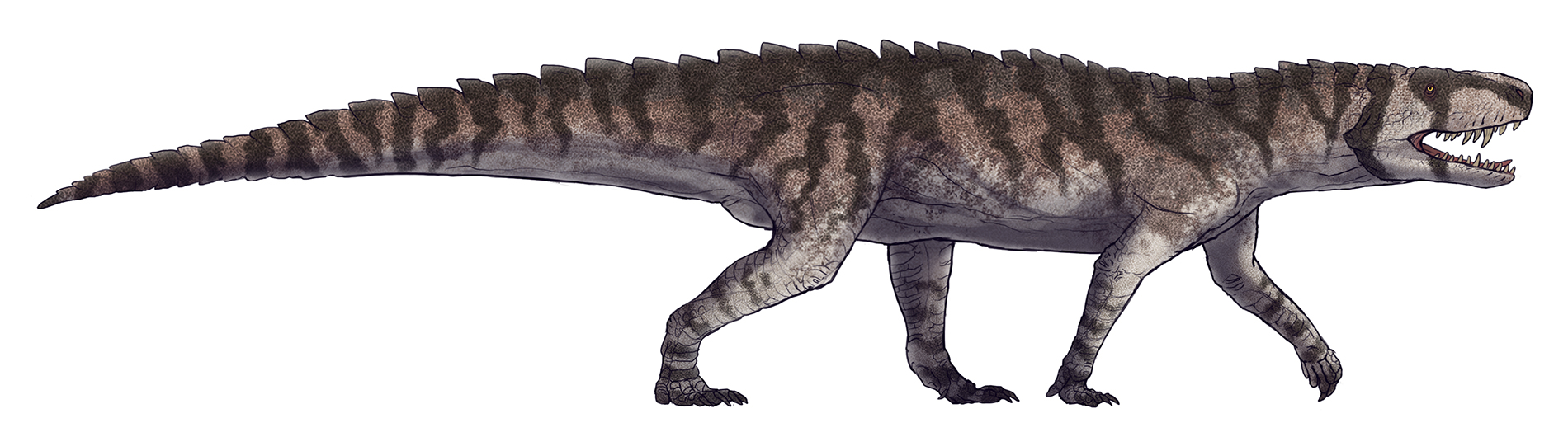
Rauisuchus tiradentes

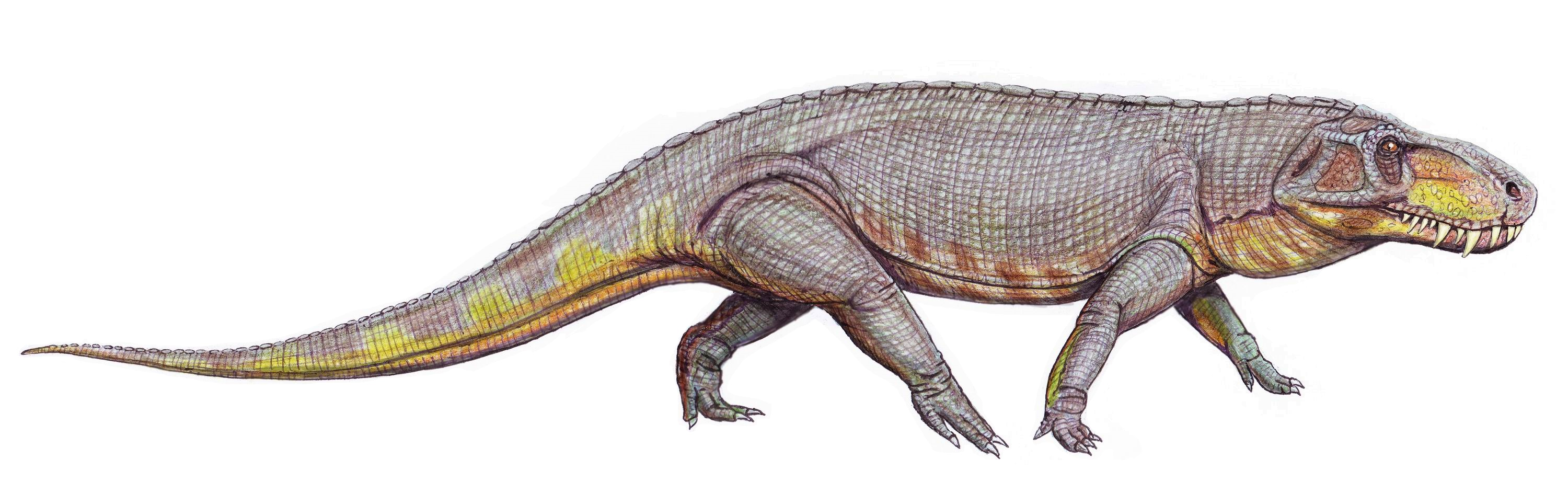
Prestosuchus chiniquensis

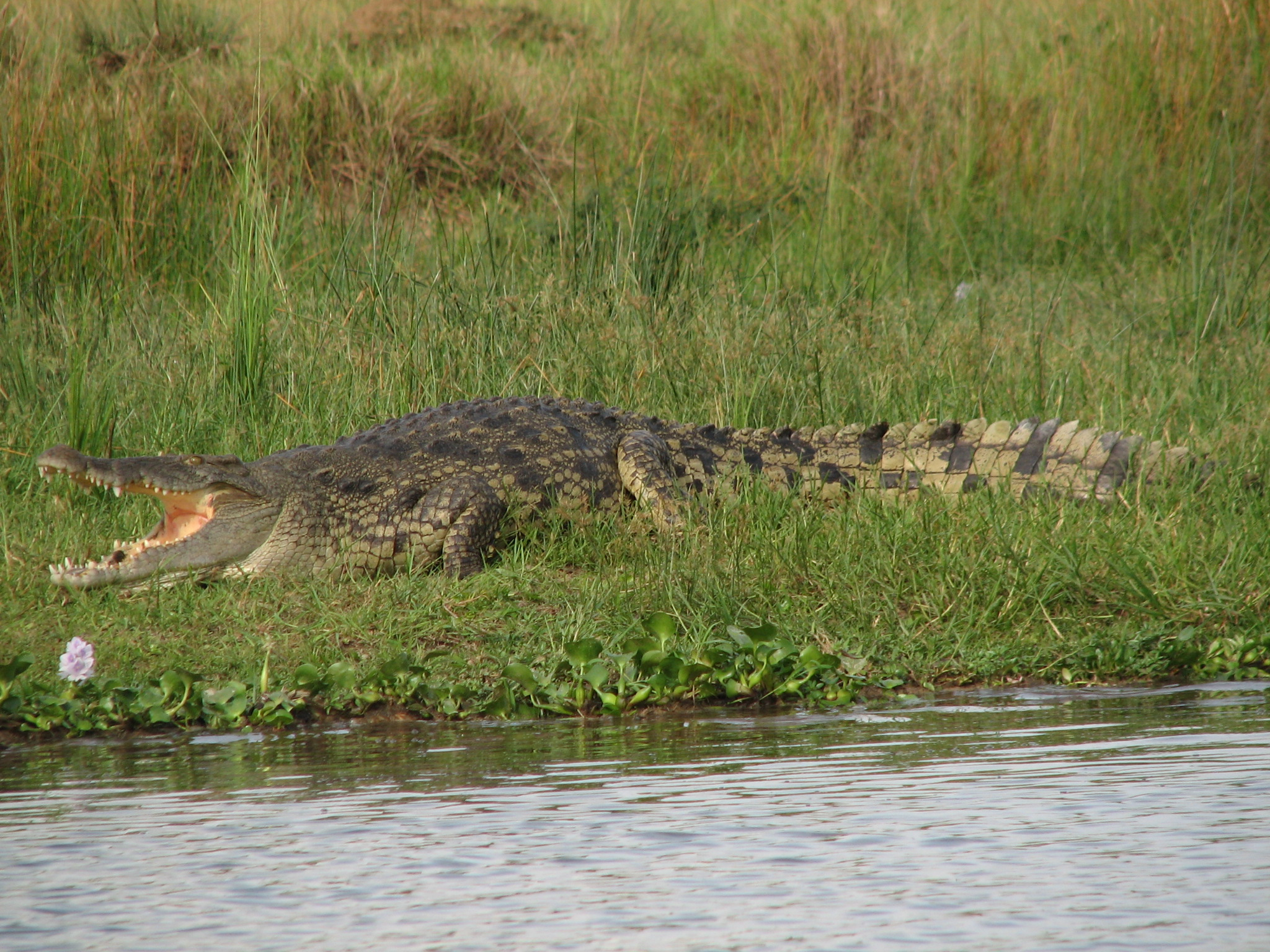
Crocodylus niloticus

=== Phylogeny ===
Below is a phylogenetic cladogram by Butler et al. in 2011 showing the cladistics of Archosauriformes, focusing mostly on Pseudosuchia: Clade names follow Nesbitt 2011.

- Crurotarsi
  - Phytosauria
    - Parasuchus
    - - Smilosuchus
      - Pseudopalatus
  - Archosauria
    - Pseudosuchia
      - Ornithosuchidae
        - Riojasuchus
        - Ornithosuchus
      - Suchia
        - Gracilisuchus
        - Turfanosuchus
        - - Revueltosaurus
          - Aetosauria
            - Aetosaurus
            - - Stagonolepis
              - Longosuchus
        - - Ticinosuchus
          - Paracrocodylomorpha
            - Poposauroidea
              - Qianosuchus
              - - Ctenosauriscidae
                - - Poposaurus
                  - - Lotosaurus
                    - Shuvosauridae
            - Loricata
              - Prestosuchus
              - - Saurosuchus
                - - Batrachotomus
                  - - Fasolasuchus
                    - - Rauisuchidae
                      - Crocodylomorpha
    - Avemetatarsalia
