= Telkaralura =

Telkaralura Temporal range: early Late Triassic, Carnian

Scientific classification
- Kingdom: Animalia
- Phylum: Chordata
- Class: Reptilia
- Clade: Pseudosuchia
- Family: †Gracilisuchidae
- Genus: †Telkaralura; Von Baczko et al., 2025
- Species: †T. coniceti

Binomial name
- †Telkaralura coniceti Von Baczko et al., 2025

Genus of gracilisuchid pseudosuchians

Telkaralura is a genus of large gracilisuchid pseudosuchian from the early Late Triassic Chañares Formation of Argentina.

== History and naming ==
The Telkaralura holotype specimen is a partial skull, PULR-V 057, discovered by the Argentine paleontologist José F. Bonaparte in 1980 within the Massetognathus-Chanaresuchus AZ of the Chañares Formation, the same sediments that also yielded the smaller Gracilisuchus. While Bonaparte never fully described the fossil material, he figured PULR-V 057 twice, once in 1996 and then again in 2007, both times suggesting that the specimen represented an early dinosaur or an ancestor of dinosaurs, an idea Bonaparte also extended onto Gracilisuchus.

In 2009, Julia Desojo and Andrea Arcucci recognized that the specimen actually represented a pseudosuchian, a crocodile-line archosaur, but interpreted it as a juvenile individual of the genus Luperosuchus. Although the specimen differed from Luperosuchus including a less developed 'roman-nose' and being a third smaller in size, these were interpreted as ontogenetic variation as the material appeared to exhibit juvenile features, including loose sutures and less developed ornamentation of the bones. In 2017, the referral of this material to Luperosuchus was questioned by Sterling Nesbitt and Desojo, who suggested that the differences between PULR-V 057 and the holotype of Luperosuchus are taxonomic rather than ontogenetic, recognizing that it represented its own unique taxon, though it was not given a name at the time. Despite being regarded as a distinct taxon, PULR-V 057 went largely ignored in subsequent years, until eventually being given a full description by Maria Belen von Baczko and colleagues, who placed it in the family Gracilisuchidae and coined the name Telkaralura.

The name Telkaralura comes from the Cacán language spoken by the Diaguita people of northwestern Argentina and is composed of the words "Télkara" and "lúra", meaning "mother earth" and "lizard" respectively. The scientific name is derived from the Consejo Nacional de Investigaciones Científicas y Técnicas, short CONICET, an Argentinian government agency for the promotion of scientific and technological development.

== Description ==
Telkaralura is the largest known member of Gracilisuchidae, with the length of the maxilla suggesting a potential skull length between 19.2–20.8 cm (7.6–8.2 in). This makes it about 20 to 25% larger than the Chinese gracilisuchids Turfanosuchus and Yonghesuchus as well as Parvosuchus from Brazil, twice the size of Gracilisuchus and five times as large as Maehary.

== Phylogeny ==
Phylogenetic analysis recovers Telkaralura as a derived member of Gracilisuchidae, specifically as the sister taxon of Parvosuchus and furthermore closely related to Gracilisuchus and Maehary, forming a branch of exclusively South American forms. The Chinese taxa Yonghesuchus and Turfanosuchus meanwhile occupy basal positions in the family.

- - Avemetatarsalia
  - - Phytosauria
    - - Nundasuchus
      - - - Ornithosuchidae
          - - Erpetosuchidae
            - Aetosauriformes
        - - - Ticinosuchus
            - - Mandasuchus
              - - Loricata
                - Poposauroidea
          - Gracilisuchidae
            - Turfanosuchus
            - - Yonghesuchus
              - - Maehary
                - - Gracilisuchus
                  - - Parvosuchus
                    - Telkaralura

== Paleobiology ==
While there is little written provenance data from the initial discovery of the Telkaralura holotype, the sediment that adheres to the fossil material and the colour and preservation of the fossil itself suggests that the remains come from the Massetognathus-Chanaresuchus Assemblage Zone of the lower Chañares Formation. The Massetognathus-Chanaresuchus AZ only preserves one other pseudosuchian in addition to Telkaralura, its smaller relative Gracilisuchus. In addition to these gracilisuchids, the faunal zone also features a diverse selection of animals including various smaller forms of proterochampsids (such as Tropidosuchus and Chanaresuchus), avemetatarsalians (including Lewisuchus and Lagosuchus) as well as cynodonts. With maximum estimated weights of below 30 kg (66 lb) or femurs up to 15 cm (5.9 in) long, these animals are notably smaller than Telkaralura, which has an estimated femoral length of 19 cm (7.5 in). However the role of top predator was likely taken by the significantly larger (femoral length of 23.1 cm (9.1 in)) proterochampsid Gualosuchus.
