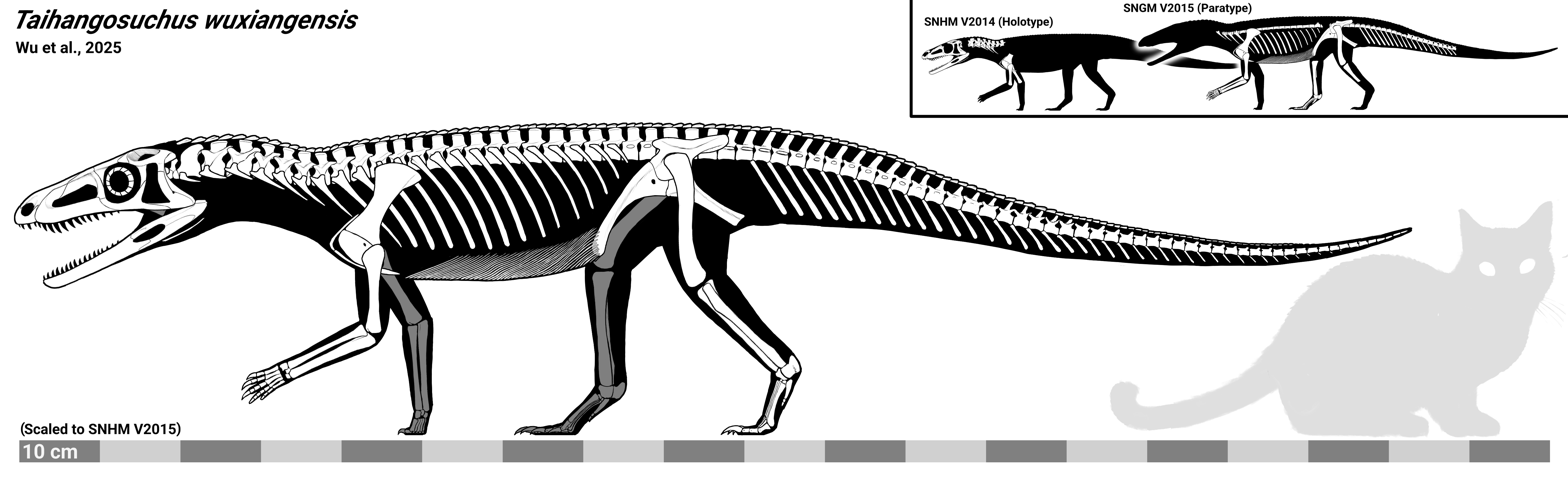
- Skeletal reconstruction

Scientific classification
- Kingdom: Animalia
- Phylum: Chordata
- Class: Reptilia
- Clade: Archosauria
- Clade: Pseudosuchia
- Family: †Gracilisuchidae
- Genus: †Taihangosuchus; Wu et al., 2025
- Species: †T. wuxiangensis

Binomial name
- †Taihangosuchus wuxiangensis Wu et al., 2025

= Taihangosuchus =

Taihangosuchus Temporal range: Middle Triassic (Anisian), ~247–241 Ma

Genus of pseudosuchian archosaurs

Taihangosuchus is an extinct genus of gracilisuchid pseudosuchians from the Middle Triassic (Anisian age) Ermaying Formation of China. The genus contains a single species, Taihangosuchus wuxiangensis, known from two partial skeletons, one of which includes a skull.

== Discovery and naming ==
The Taihangosuchus fossil material was collected in 2013 by a team from the Shanxi Natural History Museum in outcrops of the Ermaying Formation near Xizaolincun Village in Shanxi Province, China. Two specimens were discovered in close association, and both are accessioned at the Shanxi Natural History Museum (SNHM). One specimen, SNHM V2014, comprises a skull and partial skeleton including nine cervical (neck) vertebrae, both humeri, and part of the right pectoral girdle (scapula and coracoid). The second specimen (SNHM V2015) is more complete, albeit missing the skull, anterior (toward the front) cervical vertebrae, and posterior (toward the back) caudal (tail) vertebrae. The humerus of SNHM V2014 is 9 cm (3.5 in) long, while this bone is 11 cm (4.3 in) long in SNHM V2015, around 22% larger than the holotype.

In 2025, Wu and colleagues described Taihangosuchus wuxiangensis as a new genus and species of pseudosuchians based on these fossil remains, assigning SNHM V2014 as the holotype specimen and SNHM V2015 as the paratype. The specific name, wuxiangensis, references the discovery of the specimens in Wuxiang County.

== Description and paleobiology ==
The skull of Taihangosuchus is around 18 centimetres (7.1 in) long in the holotype. The part of the maxilla in front of the antorbital fenestra is very short, and the antorbital fossa is longer than the orbit. The scapula, humerus, and ulna are all similar in length. The postacetabular process (rear part) of the ilium is truncated, instead of pointed like in other gracilisuchids. There is a robust ridge along the dorsal margin of this region for the origin of the caudofemoralis brevis muscle.

Several bone fragments are identifiable in the ribcage of the paratype specimen. The most identifiable elements are osteoderms of various sizes. The morphology of these osteoderms is most similar to those of Halazhaisuchus (also known from the Ermaying Formation, albeit a lower part) and Batrachotomus. As such, this may be an indication that Taihangosuchus preyed on animals similar to these. Alternatively, they may derive from an unknown archosaur or even other individuals of Taihangosuchus.

== Classification ==
In their phylogenetic analyses, Wu et al. (2025) recovered Taihangosuchus as a member of the early-diverging pseudosuchian clade Gracilisuchidae. Their results placed it diverging after the similarly aged Chinese Turfanosuchus, also dating to the Anisian age, but before the clade formed by the Chinese Yonghesuchus and Argentinian Gracilisuchus. These results are congruent with the chronostratigraphic (relating to rock layers over time) occurrences of these genera, with older genera diverging first, and younger (more recent) genera diverging later. This may imply that gracilisuchids originated in the landmass Laurasia, diversifying in Asia before spreading elsewhere (Gondwana). While not included in the description of Taihangosuchus, the description of the Brazilian gracilisuchid Parvosuchus by Müller (2024) recovered a similar topology, with Parvosuchus in a derived position close to Gracilisuchus, to which it is similar in age. A cladogram following Wu et al. (2025) is displayed below:

- Pseudosuchia
  - - †Erpetosuchidae
      - †Parringtonia
      - †Erpetosuchus
    - †Gracilisuchidae
      - †Turfanosuchus
      - - †Taihangosuchus
        - - †Gracilisuchus
          - †Yonghesuchus
  - Suchia
    - - †Aetosauria
      - †Ornithosuchidae
    - - †Ticinosuchus
      - Paracrocodylomorpha
        - †Poposauroidea
        - Loricata
