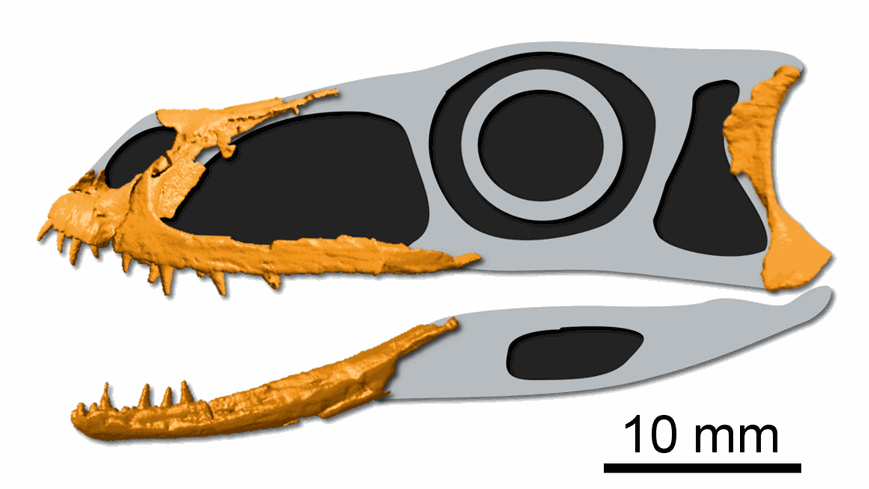
- Hypothetical skull reconstruction

Scientific classification
- Kingdom: Animalia
- Phylum: Chordata
- Class: Reptilia
- Clade: Pseudosuchia
- Clade: Suchia
- Family: †Gracilisuchidae
- Genus: †Maehary; Kellner et al., 2022
- Species: †M. bonapartei

Binomial name
- †Maehary bonapartei Kellner et al., 2022

= Maehary =

Maehary Temporal range: Late Triassic, (Norian) ~225.42 Ma

Extinct genus of pseudosuchian archosaurs

Maehary (meaning "one who looks to the sky" in Guaraní) is an extinct genus of gracilisuchid pseudosuchian archosaurs from the Late Triassic (Norian age) Caturrita Formation of Rio Grande do Sul, Brazil. The genus contains a single species, Maehary bonapartei, known from a partial skull and fragmentary postcrania. Maehary was originally described as the basalmost member of the Pterosauromorpha, but several subsequent studies have suggested pseudosuchian affinities are more likely. If this is correct, it would represent the youngest known member of the Gracilisuchidae.

== Discovery and naming ==
Maehary bonapartei type locality in Rio Grande do Sul, Brazil

The Maehary holotype specimen, CAPPA/UFSM 0300, was discovered between 2002 and 2005 in layers of the Caturrita Formation (Linha São Luiz Site, Candelária Sequence, Santa Maria Supersequence) near Faxinal do Soturno, Rio Grande do Sul, Brazil. The holotype consists of a partial skull, vertebral centra, and a fragmentary scapula. Another specimen, UFRGS-PV-0769-T, was also assigned to the genus, consisting of a left maxilla. The maxilla was originally described in 2010 as belonging to the supposed basal pterosaur Faxinalipterus. However, when Faxinalipterus was reinterpreted as a lagerpetid in 2022, the bone was removed from its hypodigm and reidentified as belonging to Maehary.

In 2022, Kellner et al. described Maehary bonapartei as a new genus and species of pterosauromorph. The generic name, "Maehary" is derived from the Guarani-Kaiowa phrase "Ma'ehary", roughly translating to "who looks to the sky", in reference to the alleged pterosauromorph affinities of the taxon. The specific name, "bonapartei", honors the Argentine paleontologist José F. Bonaparte.

Later analyses suggested that Maehary actually represents a gracilisuchid member of the clade Pseudosuchia, rather than a pterosauromorph.

== Classification ==
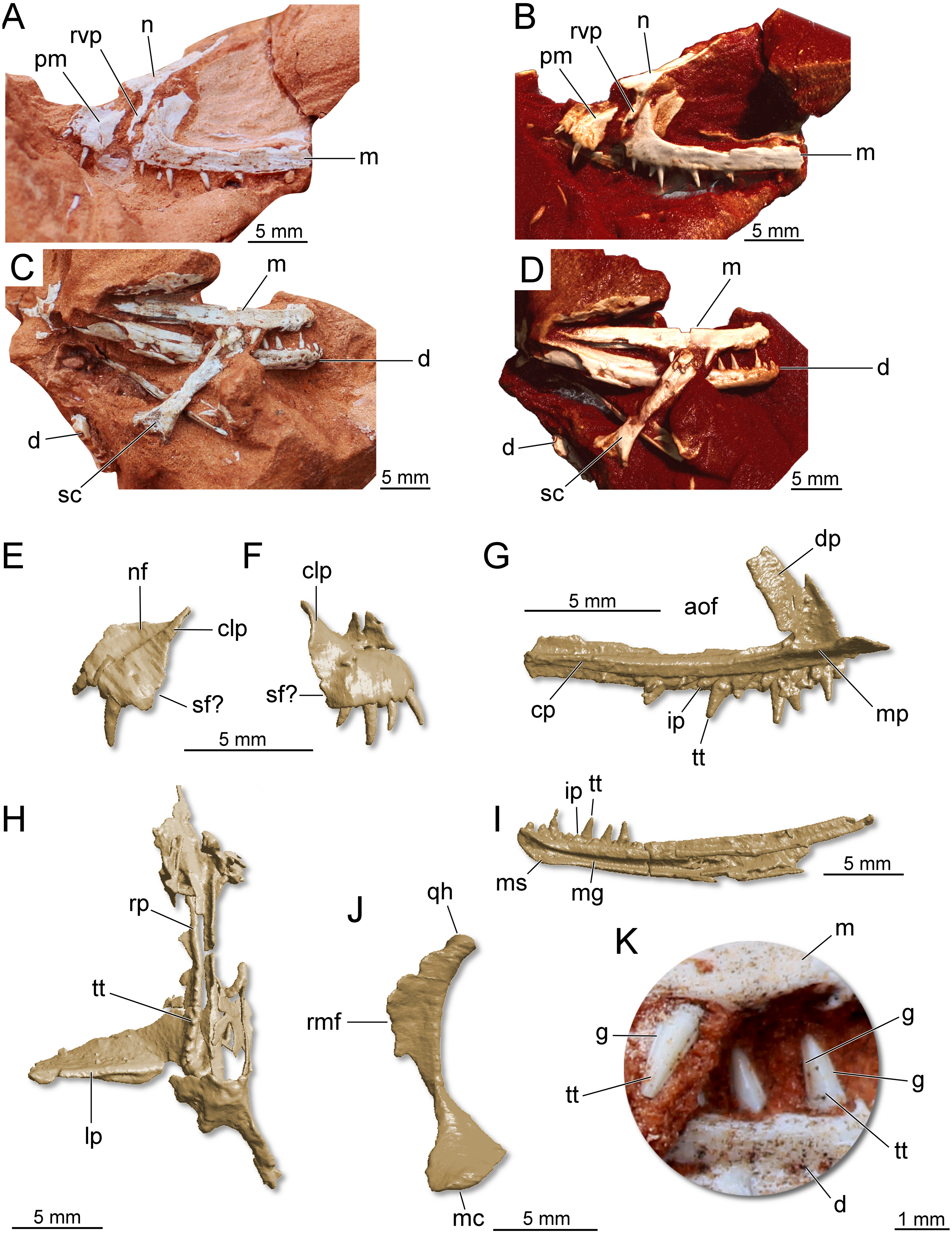
Holotype skull material

Kellner et al. (2022) recovered Maehary as the earliest diverging member of Pterosauromorpha. The results of their phylogenetic analysis are shown in the cladogram below, illustrating its position within the Archosauria:

- Archosauria
  - Pseudosuchia
  - Pan-Aves
    - Aphanosauria
    - Ornithodira
      - Dinosauromorpha
      - Pterosauromorpha
        - Maehary
        - - Lagerpetidae
            - Faxinalipterus
            - Lagerpeton
            - Ixalerpeton
            - Kongonaphon
            - PVSJ883
            - Dromomeron gregorii
            - - Dromomeron romeri
              - Dromomeron gigas
          - - Pterosauria

In the 2023 description of the lagerpetid Venetoraptor, Müller et al. corrected some of the phylogenetic characters that led to the recovery of Maehary as a pterosauromorph. The updated analysis recovered it as a derived member of the suchian clade Gracilisuchidae, as the sister taxon to Gracilisuchus. The authors did not discuss the updated phylogenetic position. Later that year, Foffa et al. discussed the phylogenetic affinities of Maehary, explaining that it could not be confidently regarded as a pterosauromorph without additional fossil material to clarify its anatomy. While their maximum parsimony analyses found it to be the basalmost pterosauromorph (similar to Kellner et al. in 2022), using unconstrained Bayesian inference analyses moved it to a polytomy with Lewisuchus and Silesauridae as the sister taxon of the Dinosauria. As such, they cautioned that the position of Maehary should be regarded as uncertain. A 2024 analysis focused on lagerpetids, a clade of early pterosauromorphs, also recovered Maehary as a gracilisuchid.

Later in 2024, Rodrigo T. Müller described the well-preserved remains of a new gracilisuchid, Parvosuchus aurelioi. When included in a phylogenetic dataset, it was found in the clade of Gracilisuchus + Maehary. Since the inclusion of an unequivocal gracilisuchid did not affect the relationships of Maehary, he suggested that this was the appropriate classification for the taxon. The archosaurian results of Müller et al. (2023) are displayed in the cladogram below:

- Archosauria
  - Pseudosuchia
    - Phytosauria
    - - Nundasuchus
      - Suchia
        - - Ornithosuchidae
          - - Aetosauriformes
            - - Erpetosuchidae
        - - Gracilisuchidae
            - Turfanosuchus
            - - Yonghesuchus
              - - Gracilisuchus
                - Maehary
          - - Ticinosuchus
            - - Mandasuchus
              - - Paracrocodylomorpha
  - Pan-Aves
    - Spondylosoma
    - Aphanosauria
    - Ornithodira
      - Dinosauromorpha
      - Pterosauromorpha
        - Lagerpetidae
        - Pterosauria
