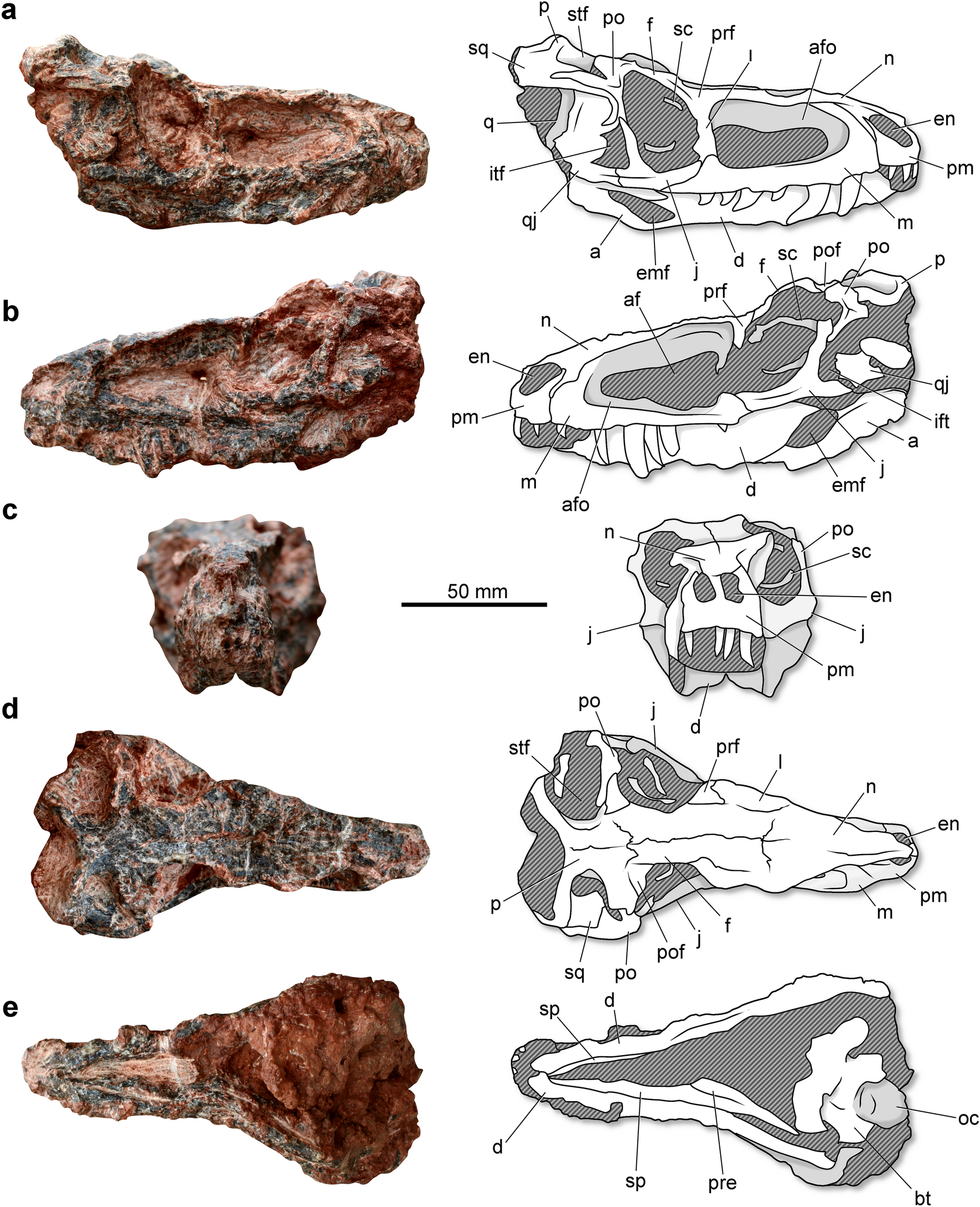
- Holotype skull

Scientific classification
- Kingdom: Animalia
- Phylum: Chordata
- Class: Reptilia
- Clade: Archosauria
- Clade: Pseudosuchia
- Family: †Gracilisuchidae
- Genus: †Parvosuchus; Müller, 2024
- Species: †P. aurelioi

Binomial name
- †Parvosuchus aurelioi Müller, 2024

= Parvosuchus =

Parvosuchus Temporal range: Middle–Late Triassic (Ladinian–Carnian), ~237 Ma

Genus of pseudosuchian archosaurs

Parvosuchus (meaning "small crocodile") is an extinct genus of gracilisuchid pseudosuchians from the Middle–Late Triassic Santa Maria Formation (Paraná Basin) of Brazil. The genus contains a single species, P. aurelioi, known from a cranium and partial skeleton.

== Discovery and naming ==
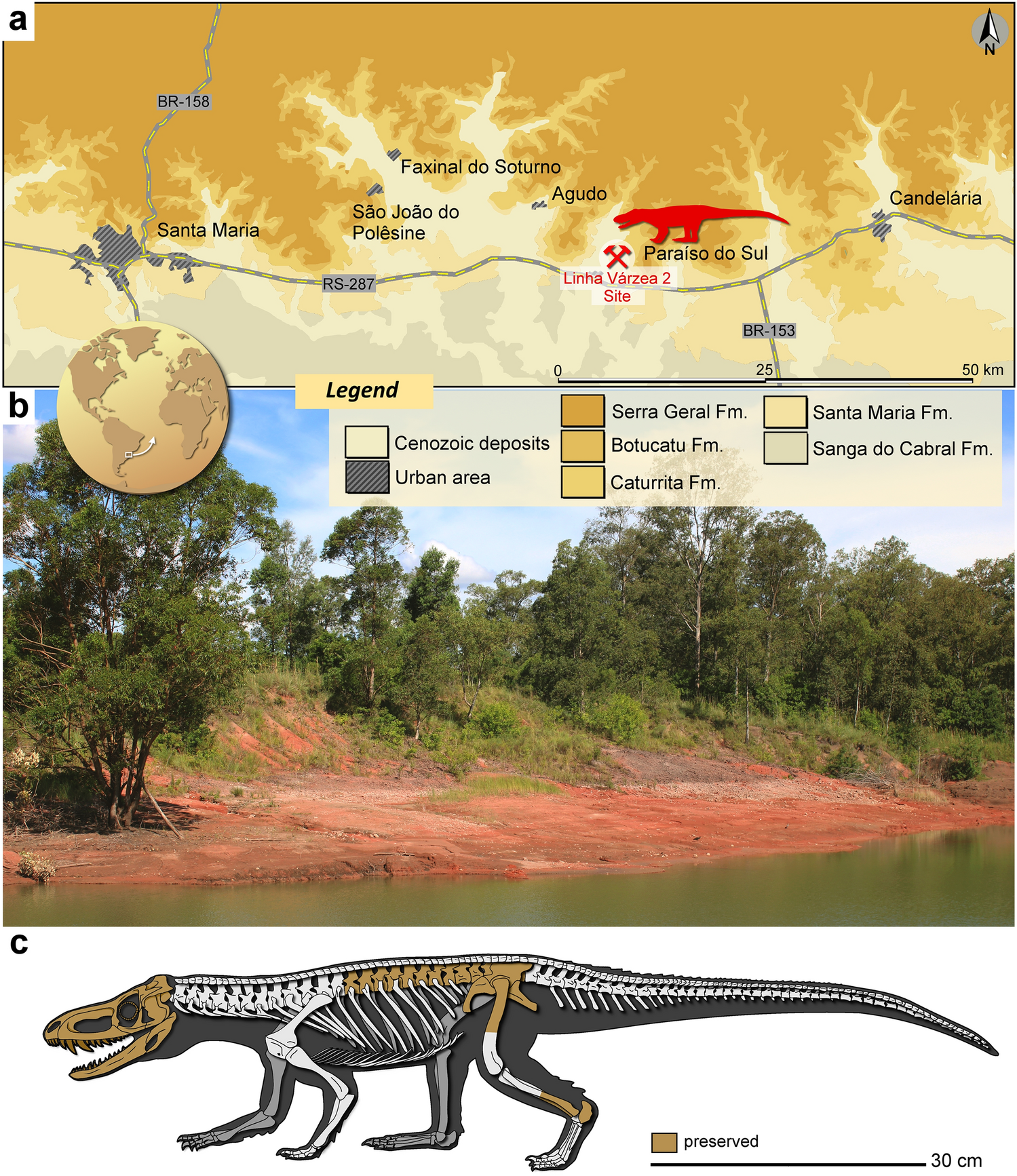
Type locality and skeletal diagram

The Parvosuchus holotype specimen, CAPPA/UFSM 0412, was discovered at the Linha Várzea 2 site in the Pinheiros-Chiniquá Sequence, which belongs to the Santa Maria Formation of the Santa Maria Supersequence (Paraná Basin) in Paraíso do Sul municipality of Rio Grande do Sul state, Brazil. This locality represents the Dinodontosaurus Assemblage Zone. The specimen consists of a largely articulated skeleton, including the skull and lower jaws, the last 11 dorsal vertebrae, two sacral vertebrae, a pelvic girdle, part of the right femur, and a partial left hindlimb (comprising pieces of the femur, tibia, fibula, and calcaneum).

In 2024, Rodrigo T. Müller described Parvosuchus aurelioi as a new genus and species of gracilisuchid pseudosuchians based on these fossil remains. The generic name, Parvosuchus, combines "parvus", a Latin word meaning "small", with "suchus", a Greek word meaning "crocodile" (σοῦχος, after Sobek, the crocodile-headed ancient Egyptian deity). The specific name, aurelioi, honors Pedro L. P. Aurélio, the discoverer of the holotype.

== Description ==
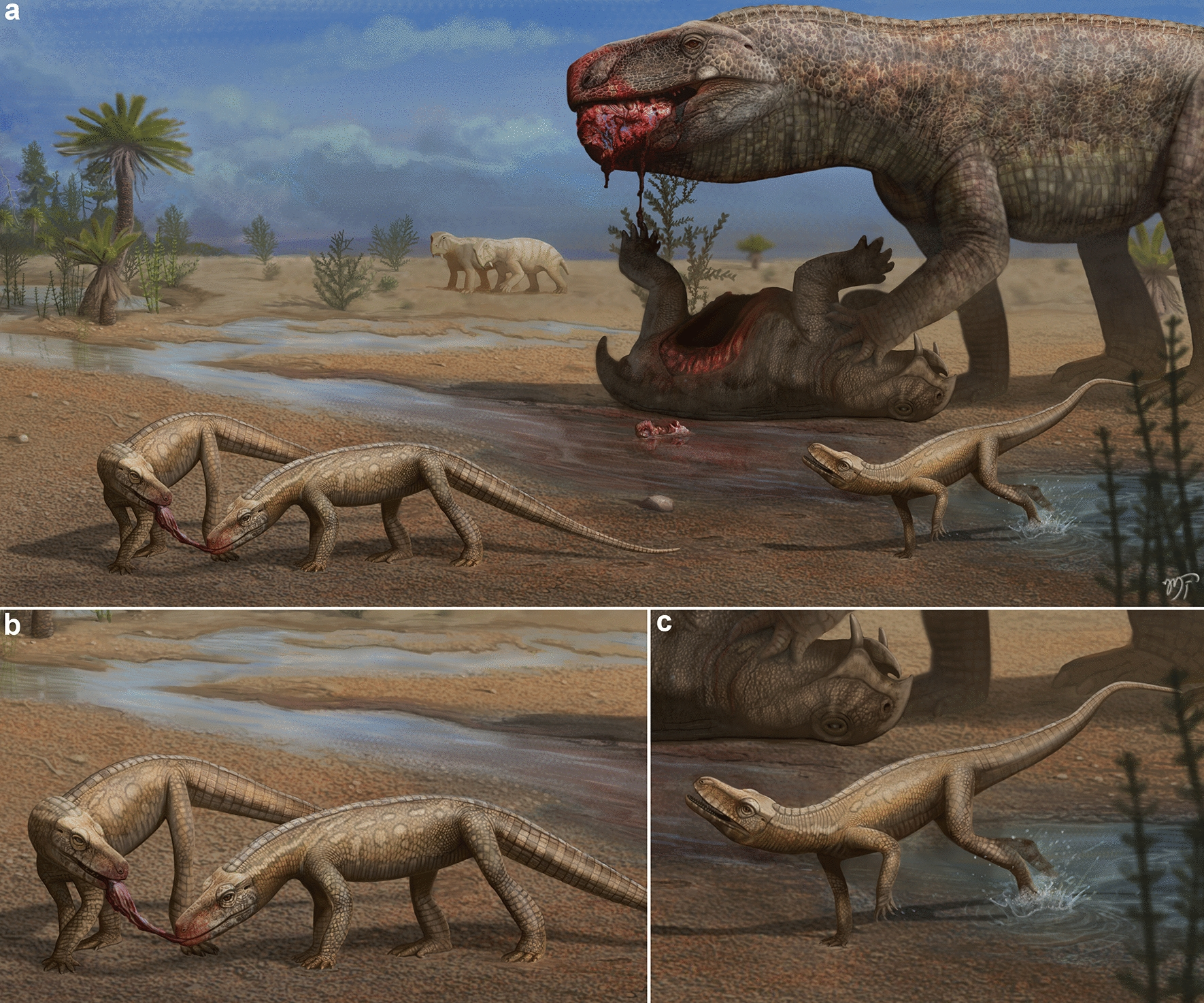
Life restoration of Parvosuchus (close-ups in b and c) with a Prestosuchus individual feeding on a dicynodont carcass

The skull of Parvosuchus is 144 millimetres (5.7 in) long. Based on its fossil remains and those of more complete relatives, its body length is estimated at 1 metre (3.3 ft). Its teeth are blade-like and elongated, a feature indicative of predatory behavior and carnivorous habits.

== Classification ==
In his phylogenetic analyses, Müller (2024) recovered Parvosuchus in a clade with Maehary (which was originally identified as an early pterosauromorph) and Gracilisuchus within the Gracilisuchidae. These results are displayed in the cladogram below:

- Suchia
  - - †Ornithosuchidae
    - - †Erpetosuchidae
      - †Aetosauriformes
  - - †Gracilisuchidae
      - Turfanosuchus
      - - Yonghesuchus
        - - Gracilisuchus
          - Maehary
          - Parvosuchus
    - - †Ticinosuchus
      - - †Mandasuchus
        - Paracrocodylomorpha
