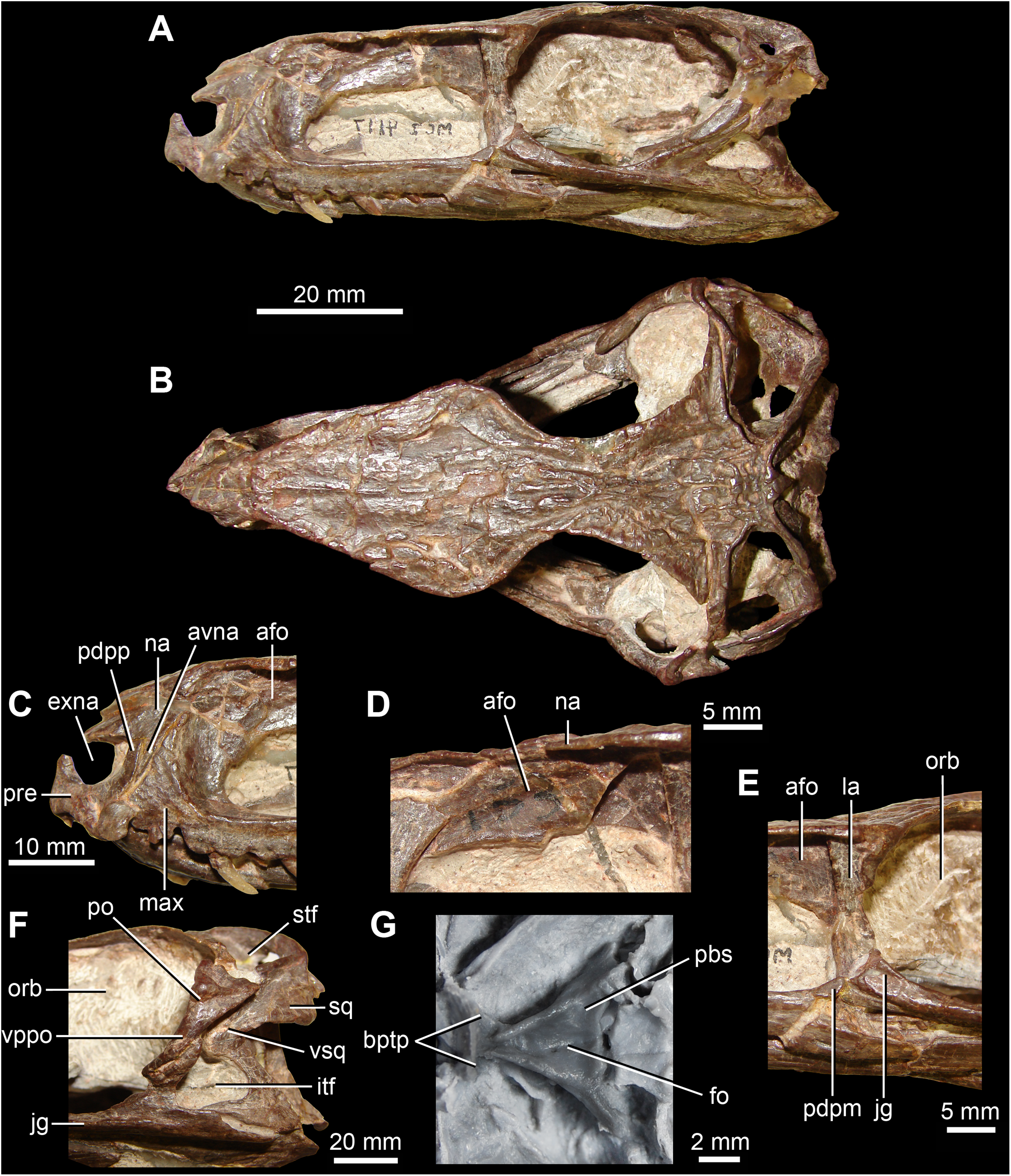
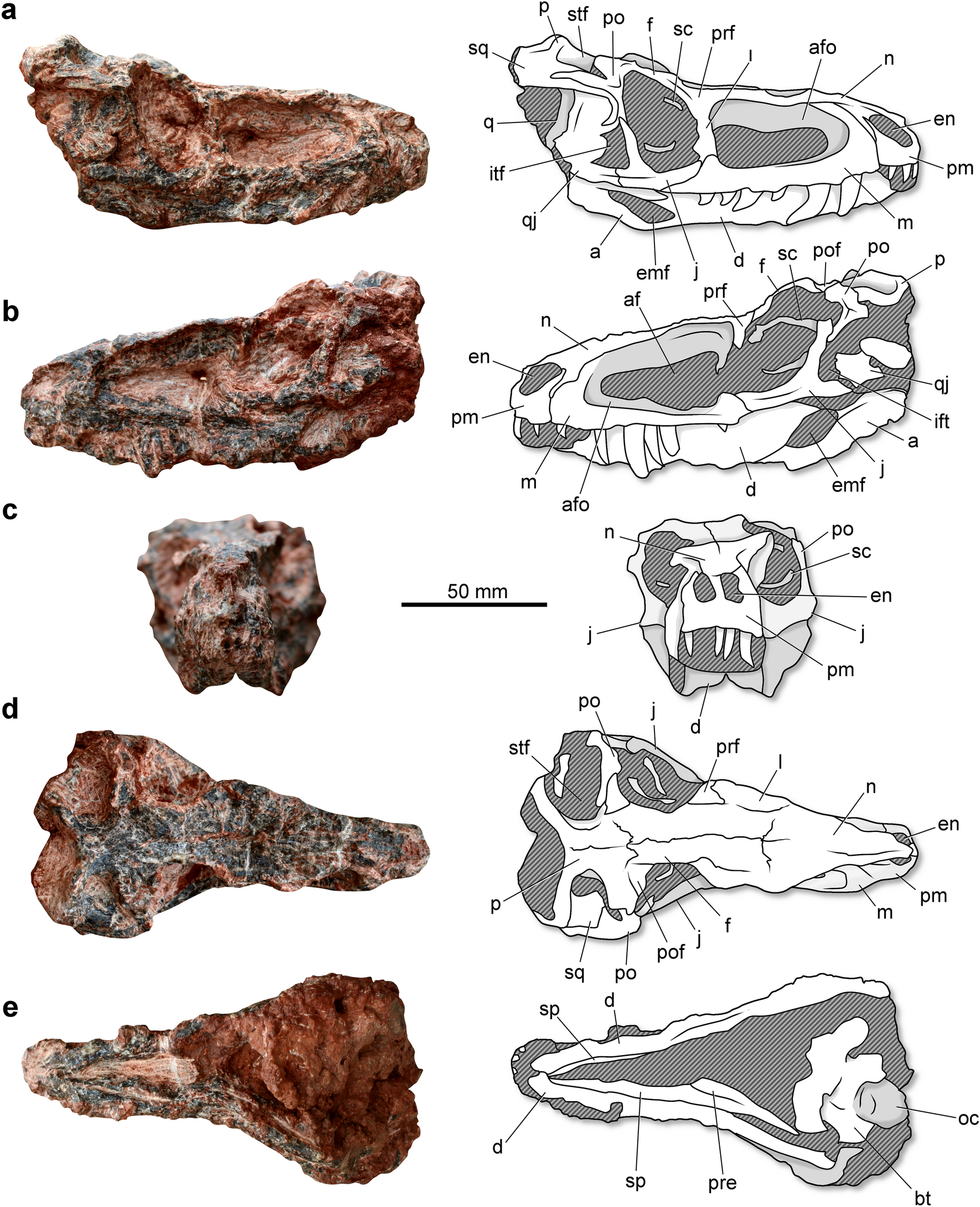
- Skulls of Gracilisuchus (left) and Parvosuchus (right)

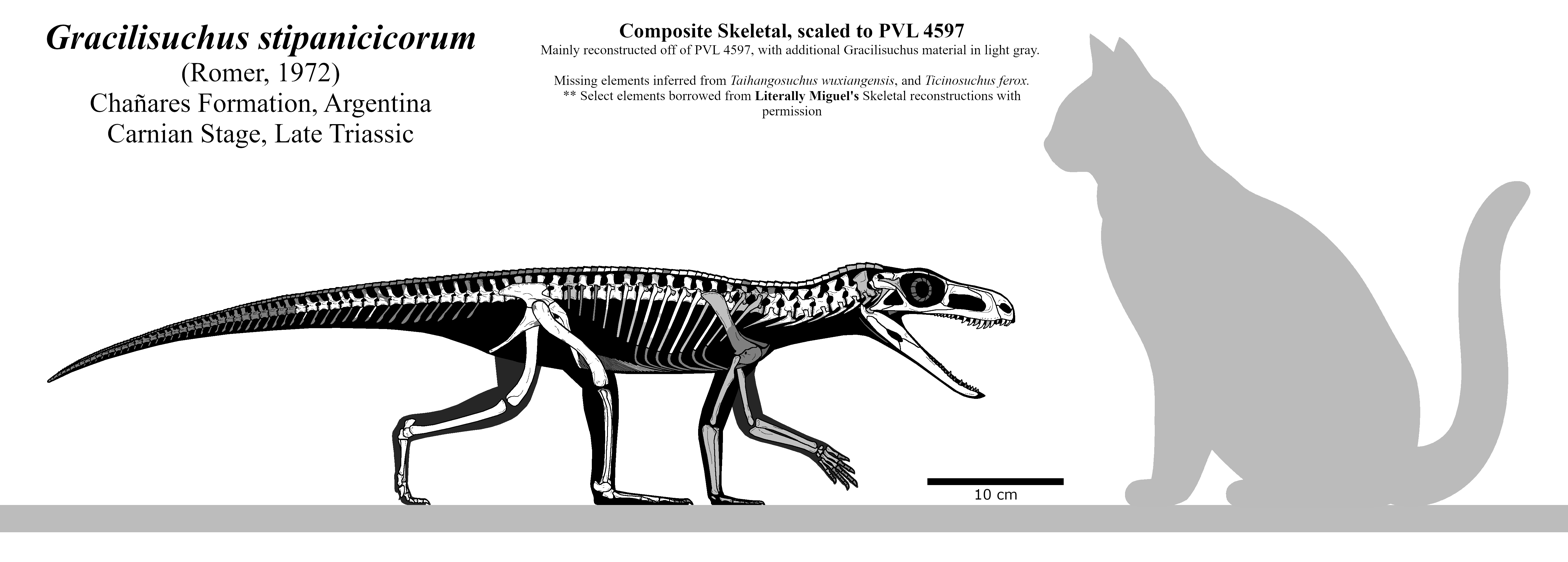
- Skeletal reconstruction of Gracilisuchus stipanicicorum

Scientific classification
- Kingdom: Animalia
- Phylum: Chordata
- Class: Reptilia
- Clade: Pseudosuchia
- Clade: Suchia
- Family: †Gracilisuchidae; Butler et al. 2014

Genera
- †Gracilisuchus; †Maehary?; †Parvosuchus; †Taihangosuchus; †Telkaralura; †Turfanosuchus; †Yonghesuchus

= Gracilisuchidae =

Gracilisuchids Temporal range: Anisian-Carnian, 247.2–234 Ma Norian presence if Maehary is a member

Extinct family of reptiles

Gracilisuchidae is an extinct family of suchian archosaurs known from the early Middle Triassic to the early Late Triassic (Anisian – early Carnian) of China, Argentina, and Brazil.

== Distribution ==
The oldest known gracilisuchids are Turfanosuchus dabanensis and Taihangosuchus wuxiangensis from the Anisian stage of Xinjiang and Shanxi Province, China, respectively. Two gracilisuchids are known from the Ladinian or early Carnian stage, Gracilisuchus stipanicicorum and Yonghesuchus sangbiensis, from La Rioja Province of Argentina, and Shanxi, respectively. These species were considered enigmatic prior to the recognition of the family in 2014, suggesting a rapid phylogenetic diversification of archosaurs by the Middle Triassic. This radiation is a part of the broader recovery of terrestrial ecosystems after the Permian–Triassic extinction event. Gracilisuchids are known from approximately similar northern and southern mid-palaeolatitudes, demonstrating a wide distribution of early archosaurs over much or all of Pangaea by the early Middle Triassic. Parvosuchus, from Brazil's Santa Maria Formation (Ladinian–Carnian boundary), represents the first unequivocal gracilisuchid from the country. Maehary, known from the Caturrita Formation (Norian stage) of Brazil, is likely a gracilisuchid, although it was originally described as an early-diverging pterosauromorph.

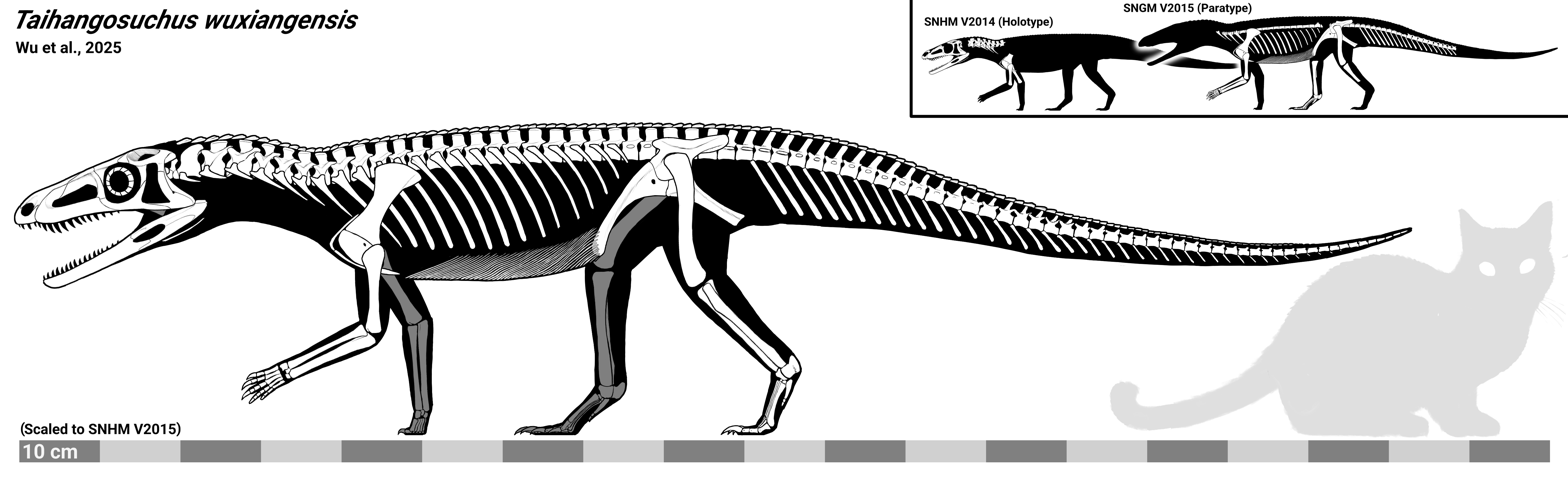
Skeletal reconstruction of Taihangosuchus

== History ==
The family Gracilisuchidae first appeared in a classification scheme for all fossil vertebrates, published by Robert L. Carroll in 1988. As no description or definition were provided by Carroll for the erection of the name, it is unavailable under Article 13.1.1 of the International Code of Zoological Nomenclature. Richard J. Butler, Corwin Sullivan, Martín D. Ezcurra, Jun Liu, Agustina Lecuona and Roland B. Sookias described and officially named the family in 2014, to include several early archosaurs, previously considered enigmatic. They phylogenetically defined the family as the most inclusive clade containing Gracilisuchus stipanicicorum, but not Ornithosuchus woordwardi, Aetosaurus ferratus, Poposaurus gracilis, Postosuchus kirkpatricki, Rutiodon carolinensis, Erpetosuchus granti, Revueltosaurus callenderi, Crocodylus niloticus (the Nile Crocodile), or Passer domesticus (the house sparrow). Apart from Gracilisuchus stipanicicorum, Carroll assigned to Gracilisuchidae the Middle Triassic Lewisuchus admixtus, which is now considered a silesaurid dinosauriform. Turfanosuchus dabanensis and Yonghesuchus sangbiensis were considered basal or stem archosaurs prior to their inclusion in the family in 2014, depending on phylogenetic hypothesis.

== Classification ==
In the phylogenetic analyses accompanying their description of the gracilisuchid Taihangosuchus, Wu et al. (2025) recovered it diverging after the similarly aged Chinese Turfanosuchus, also dating to the Anisian age, but before the clade formed by the Chinese Yonghesuchus and Argentinian Gracilisuchus. These results are congruent with the chronostratigraphic (relating to rock layers over time) occurrences of these genera, with older genera diverging first, and younger (more recent) genera diverging later. This may imply that gracilisuchids originated in the landmass Laurasia, diversifying in Asia before spreading elsewhere (Gondwana). While not included in the description of Taihangosuchus, the description of the Brazilian gracilisuchid Parvosuchus by Müller (2024) recovered a similar topology, with Parvosuchus in a derived position close to Gracilisuchus, to which it is similar in age.

Wu et al. recovered the Gracilisuchidae as the sister taxon to the Erpetosuchidae, with this clade representing one of the two initial divergences within Pseudosuchia, the other being the more diverse Suchia (including modern crocodilians). A cladogram following these results is displayed below:

- Pseudosuchia
  - - †Erpetosuchidae
      - †Parringtonia
      - †Erpetosuchus
    - †Gracilisuchidae
      - †Turfanosuchus
      - - †Taihangosuchus
        - - †Gracilisuchus
          - †Yonghesuchus
  - Suchia
    - - †Aetosauria
      - †Ornithosuchidae
    - - †Ticinosuchus
      - Paracrocodylomorpha
        - †Poposauroidea
        - Loricata
