= Turfanosuchus =

Turfanosuchus Temporal range: Anisian ~247.2–242 Ma
- Holotype skeleton (IVPP V.32237)

Scientific classification
- Kingdom: Animalia
- Phylum: Chordata
- Class: Reptilia
- Clade: Pseudosuchia
- Clade: Suchia
- Family: †Gracilisuchidae
- Genus: †Turfanosuchus; Young, 1973

Species
- †T. dabanensis Young, 1973 (type)

Extinct genus of reptiles

Turfanosuchus is a genus of archosauriform reptile, likely a gracilisuchid archosaur, which lived during the Middle Triassic (Anisian) of northwestern China. The type species, T. dabanensis, was described by C.C. Young in 1973, based on a partially complete but disarticulated fossil skeleton (IVPP V.32237) found in the Kelamayi Formation of the Turfan Basin.

Turfanosuchus had a peculiar combination of features which has made it difficult to classify in the past. It possessed teeth on the palate, and internal carotid arteries which entered the braincase from below. These two traits were rare among Archosauria (true, crown-group archosaurs) and are more similar to non-archosaurian archosauriforms like Euparkeria. On the other hand, the ankle was much more advanced than that of animals like Euparkeria, and some features of the skull have only been observed in true archosaurs, particularly early suchians (distant ancestors of modern crocodilians). Out of this group, Turfanosuchus shares the most similarities with Gracilisuchus and Yonghesuchus, and a 2014 study grouped these three genera in the family Gracilisuchidae. Gracilisuchidae lies within Pseudosuchia, which contains all archosaurs more closely related to crocodilians than to birds. Some skull features previously considered unique to Turfanosuchus are now considered to characterize Gracilisuchidae, but Turfanosuchus retains a few unique features of the jaw and cheek region.

== Description ==
=== Skull ===
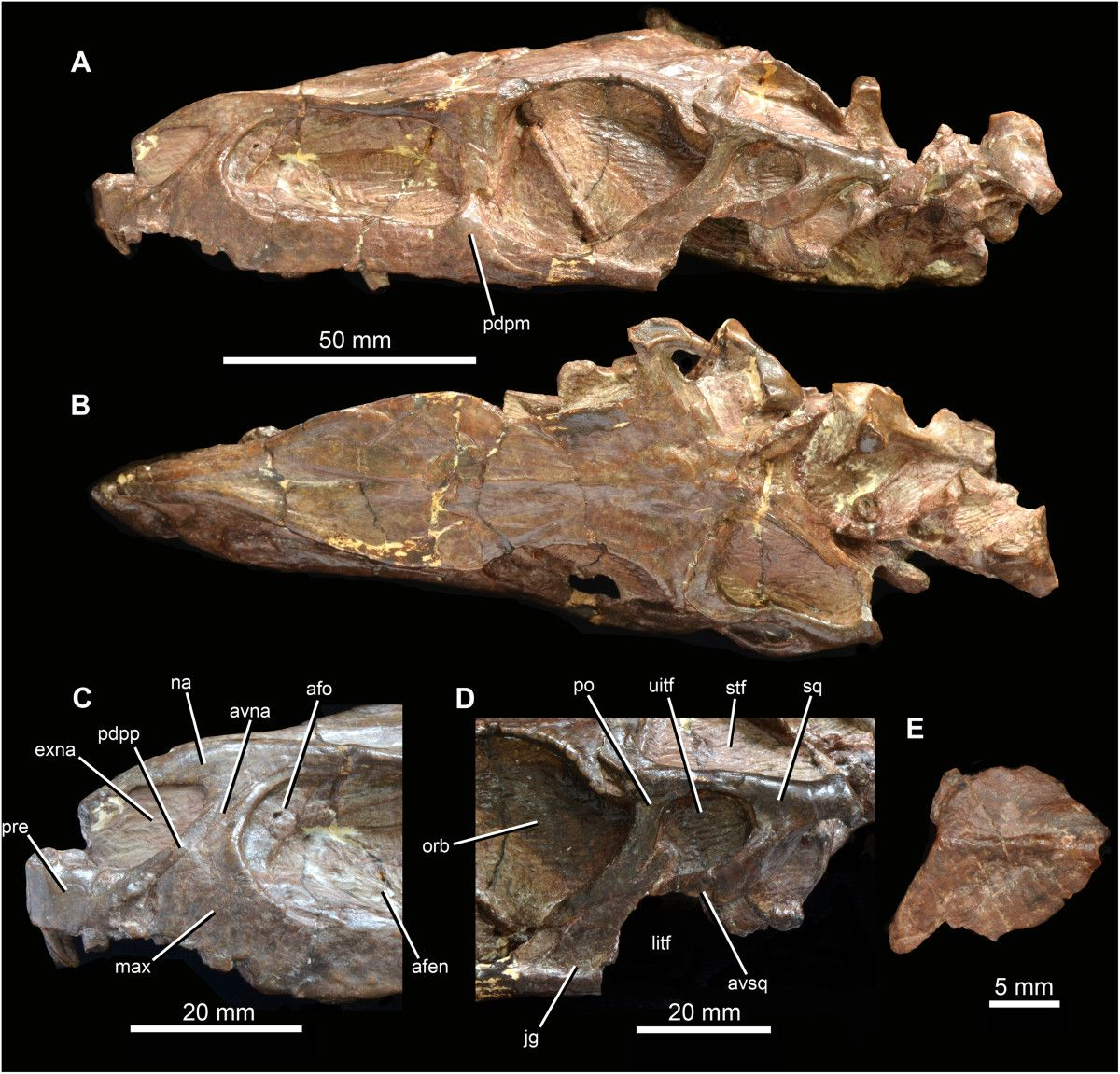
Multiple views of the holotype skull

The skull of Turfanosuchus was proportionally similar to that of other small generalized archosauriforms such as Euparkeria and Gracilisuchus. The premaxilla (a toothed bone at the tip of the snout) projects a small prong behind the nares (nostril holes). This prong, known as a posterodorsal process, bisects a corresponding branch of the nasal bones (which formed the upper surface of the snout). As with other archosaurs and their relatives, the side of the snout has a hole (known as an antorbital fenestra) surrounded by a lowered basin of bone (known as an antorbital fossa). The maxilla (the main toothed bone of the snout) also had a posterodorsal process, a much more rare trait compared to the posterodorsal process of the premaxilla (which was present in most archosauromorphs). The maxilla's posterodorsal process was a small, triangular peak of bone which formed the lower rear corner of the antorbital fossa and connected to the lacrimal bone (which lies between the antorbital fossa and the eye socket).

These posterodorsal processes are very characteristic, either by bisecting the nasal (in the case of the premaxilla's) or existing in the first place (in the case of the maxilla's). As such, they were considered by Wu & Russell (2001) to be autapomorphies (unique distinguishing traits) of Turfanosuchus. However, they are now both known to be present in Yonghesuchus and (to a lesser extent) Gracilisuchus, so they likely diagnose the entire family Gracilisuchidae, or possibly even larger subsets of Archosauria. For example, the premaxillary posterodorsal process of Revueltosaurus also bisects its nasal, and a posterodorsal process of the maxilla is present in some aetosaurs and poposauroids.

The premaxilla probably had five teeth, while the maxilla had at least 13. Preserved teeth were curved and finely serrated. The nasal bones project over the side of the snout and form the upper border of the antorbital fossa. The frontal bones (which form the portion of the skull above the eye sockets) wedge into the nasals as a large, V-shaped suture. Both of these traits are also present in Gracilisuchus. The shape of the jugal (cheek bone), on the other hand, is truly unique to Turfanosuchus. The portion of the jugal which rises behind the eye socket has a very wide base, and its surface is set inwards relative to the portion below the eye socket. As with other diapsids, Turfanosuchus had a pair of openings at the rear portion of the skull known as temporal fenestra. The bone separating the two holes, the squamosal, had a lower branch which curved forwards to contact the jugal and divide the lower temporal fenestra into two separate holes, leaving three holes at the back of the skull in total. This trait is also known is rauisuchids such as Postosuchus. A similar situation is visible in other gracilisuchids, which have a broad contact between the jugal and the lower branch of the squamosal. However, they did not retain the upper portion of the lower temporal fenestra, leaving only a small, triangular remnant of the lower temporal fenestra under the squamosal-jugal contact.

Preserved portions of the palate (roof of the mouth) were generally similar to Euparkeria. One particular similarity is the presence of teeth on the pterygoid bone. Traditionally, pterygoid teeth are considered to be absent in crown-archosaurs. Wu & Russell (2001) used this to justify classifying Turfanosuchus as a non-archosaur archosauriform. However, more recently pterygoid teeth have been reported in crown-archosaurs such as Eoraptor, Eudimorphodon, Lewisuchus, Eodromaeus, and Yonghesuchus. Therefore, their presence in Turfanosuchus does not preclude its classification as a crown-archosaur. Another seemingly non-archosaurian trait reported in Turfanosuchus is the fact that its internal carotid arteries enter the braincase from below, rather than from the sides as in almost all other archosaurs (including Gracilisuchus and Yonghesuchus). However, this trait is also known to occur in other crown-archosaurs like Arizonasaurus, Qianosuchus, and Silesaurus. Otherwise, the braincase is generally similar to other archosaurs.

The lower jaw was slender, with an elliptical hole known as a mandibular fenestra. The toothed dentary bone had two rear prongs surrounding the mandibular fenestra. Unique to Turfanosuchus among gracilisuchids, the lower prong was much longer than the upper prong. This had the added effect of excluding the angular bone (which formed the rear lower edge of the jaw) from forming the lower border of the mandibular fenestra. The surangular, which forms the upper rear portion of the jaw (and the upper border of the mandibular fenestra), was large. Another autapomorphy of Turfanosuchus is how the outer surface of the surangular was highly concave. There were at least 16 teeth in the lower jaw, and they were similar in shape to those of the upper jaw.

=== Postcranial skeleton ===
The vertebrae of Turfanosuchus were similar to those of Euparkeria and pseudosuchians, with concavities on their sides and neural spines with expanded tops. There were two sacral (hip) vertebrae, which connected to the ilium (upper plate of the hip) with large, fan-shaped sacral ribs. No intercentra were preserved, and the vertebrae lacked bevelled edges, but since the vertebrae were disarticulated and some euparkeriids retain intercentra while lacking bevelled edges, their absence in Turfanosuchus cannot be proven. The ilium was similar to that of Ticinosuchus, with a short forward projection, a much larger rear projection, and a large bony acetabulum (hip socket). The pubis (lower front plate of the hip) was moderate in length and also similar to that of Ticinosuchus. Osteoderms (bony plates) were initially reported as being absent, but later preparation revealed one. This osteoderm was broad, with a ridge on its upper surface culminating in a pointed front prong. A corresponding groove-like depression was present on the lower surface.

The humerus (upper arm bone) had a deltopectoral crest which was poorly differentiated from the humeral head. The femur (thigh bone) was similar to that of Euparkeria and most pseudosuchians, but it lacked the offset femoral head and raised fourth trochanter of avemetatarsalians or early crocodylomorphs. The calcaneum (heel bone) had many similarities with that of "crurotarsan" archosauriforms (i.e. ones with a crurotarsal ankle like phytosaurs and suchians). These include a hemicylindrical (barrel-shaped) condyle for the fibula (outer shin bone), a continuous facet between this condyle and the facet for the fourth distal tarsal (a minor ankle bone), and a rear projection known as a calcaneal tuber which was wider than tall and had flared edges. Some of these characteristics were not considered to be present until a re-evalutation of the specimen in 2011.

== Classification ==
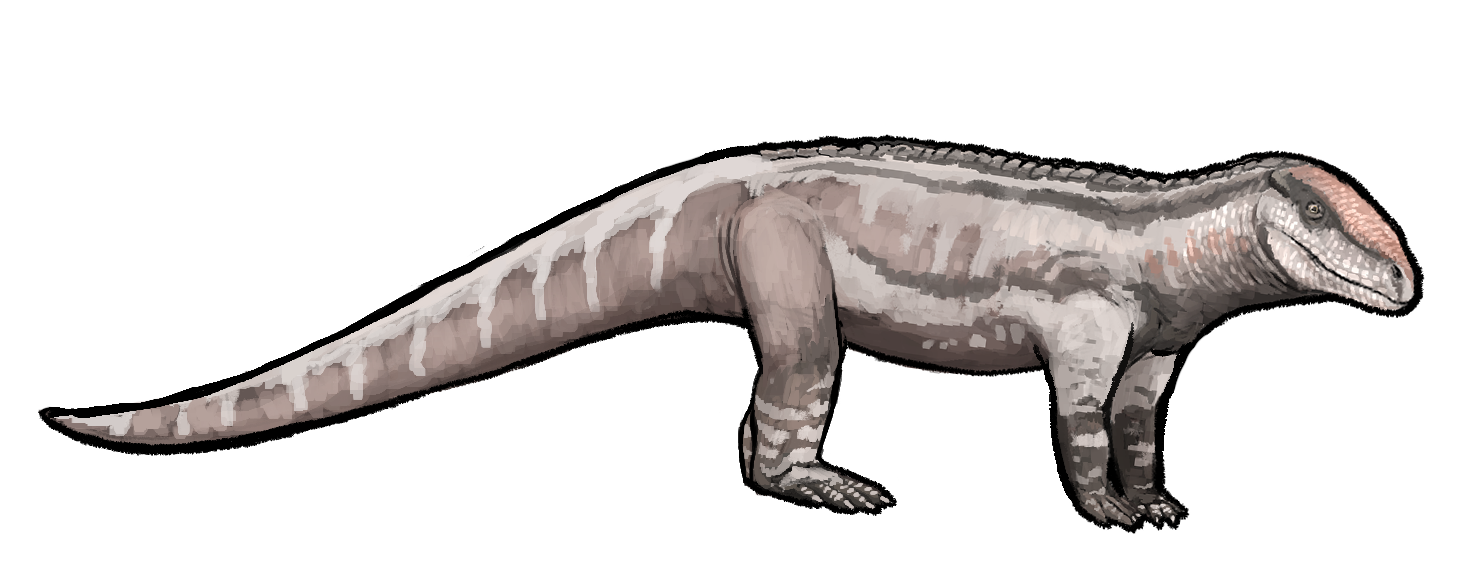
Restoration

The classification of Turfanosuchus has gone through much revision in the past due to its combination of features from both suchian archosaurs and earlier archosaur relatives such as Euparkeria. Young originally believed that the fossils came from an animal similar to Euparkeria, and assigned it to the family Euparkeriidae. The fossil, however, was not fully prepared. Subsequent analysis by Parrish in 1993 indicated that the fossils represented a suchian. A putative second species, "Turfanosuchus" shageduensis, was described in 1982. However, due to its large intercentra, this species is not considered to be a close relative of Turfanosuchus, and was likely an indeterminate euparkeriid related to Halazhaisuchus. In 2001, Xiao-Chun Wu (of the Institute of Vertebrate Paleontology and Paleoanthropology in Beijing) and Anthony Russell (of the University of Calgary) redescribed the fossil. Wu and Russell prepared the fossil, and noted the limb bones (femur and humerus) resembled those of Ticinosuchus and Euparkeria, though the calcaneum did not. Further preparation revealed a partial osteoderm. Wu and Russell concluded that Turfanosuchus was not a suchian nor even a member of the Pseudosuchia (archosaurs closer to crocodilians than to dinosaurs, also known as Crurotarsi in publications which include phytosaurs in the group). This conclusion was supported by features such as teeth on the palate and internal carotid arteries which entered the braincase from below, rather than from the side. However, they also ruled out the possibility of a close relationship with Euparkeria, noting several apomorphic ("advanced") features, such as a calcaneal tuber directed further backwards.

In 2010, paleontologists Martín Ezcurra, Agustina Lecuona, and Augustín Martinelli found Turfanosuchus to be a pseudosuchian once again during the study of the recently discovered archosauriform Koilamasuchus. This reassignment was based on the structure of the calcaneum (heel bone), which is similar to that of other early pseudosuchians, especially aetosaurs. This conclusion was also supported in 2011 by Sterling Nesbitt's comprehensive analysis on archosaurs and archosauriforms. This analysis noted that some archosaurs (such as Eoraptor) also had palatal teeth, and other (such as Silesaurus and early poposauroids) had internal carotid arteries which entered the braincase from below. In addition, the calcaneum was re-evaluated and Parrish's observations of the ankle were reconfirmed.

In 2014, Turfanosuchus was found to be closely related to the small suchians Gracilisuchus and Yonghesuchus, in the newly created family Gracilisuchidae. Most of the similarities justifying this classification were present in the skull, and some were originally considered unique to Turfanosuchus.
