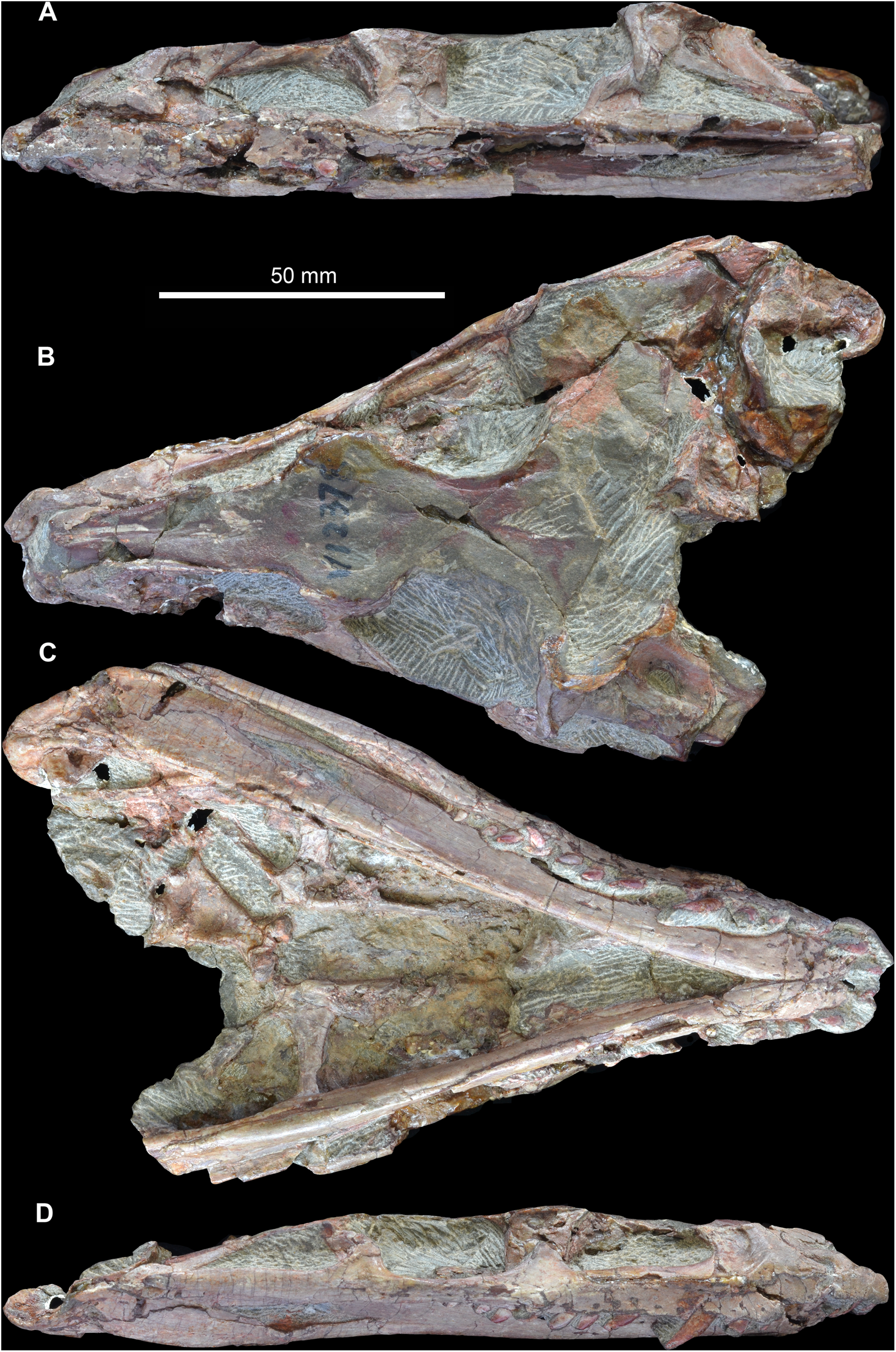
- Skull
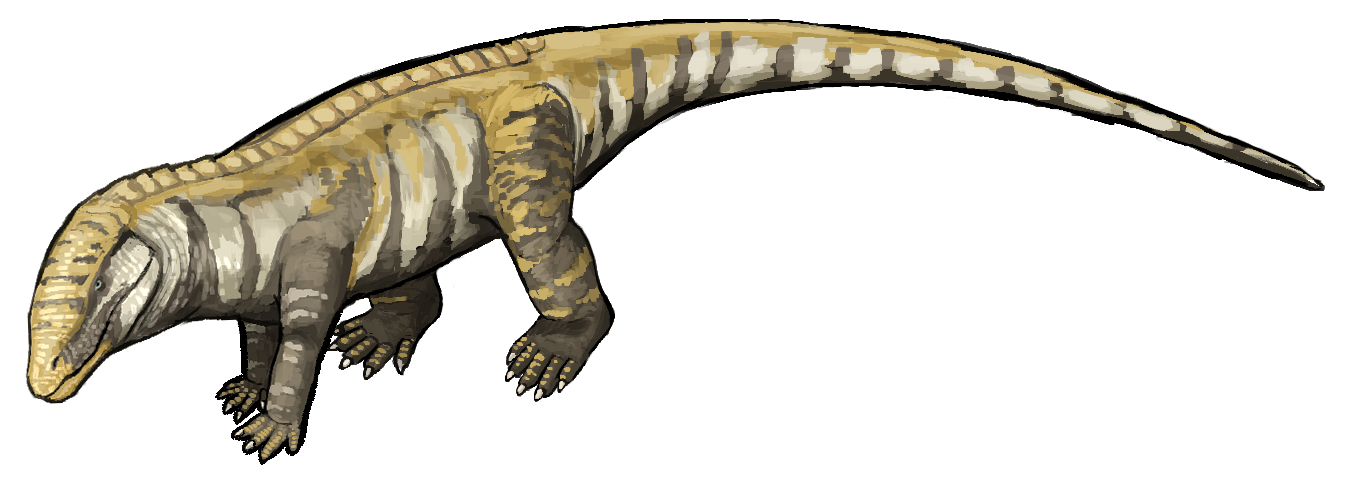
- Life restoration

Scientific classification
- Kingdom: Animalia
- Phylum: Chordata
- Class: Reptilia
- Clade: Archosauria
- Clade: Pseudosuchia
- Family: †Gracilisuchidae
- Genus: †Yonghesuchus; Wu et al., 2001

Type species
- †Yonghesuchus sangbiensis Wu et al., 2001

= Yonghesuchus =

Yonghesuchus Temporal range: Ladinian, 241.48 Ma

Extinct genus of reptiles

Yonghesuchus is an extinct genus of Late Triassic archosaur reptile. Remains have been found from the early Late Triassic Tongchuan Formation in Shanxi, China. It is named after Yonghe County, the county where fossils were found. Currently only one species, Y. sangbiensis, is known. The specific name refers to Sangbi Creek, as fossils were found in one of its banks.

== Description ==
Yonghesuchus is known from two skulls, one with an attached mandible (the holotype) and one with articulated cervical vertebrae. The holotype skull, known as IVPP V 12378, has been deformed by compression during preservation so that it has become dorsoventrally flattened. The paratype skull, known as IVPP V 12379, has also experienced damage as a result of its preservation.

The premaxilla, the bone at the front of the snout, projects past the front teeth to form a small pointed tip at the end of the snout. Behind the premaxilla is the maxilla, which contains a small depression that forms part of the antorbital fossa. This depression distinguishes Yonghesuchus from related archosauriforms such as Turfanosuchus. As in other archosauriforms such as Turfanosuchus and Euparkeria, the palate is covered in very small teeth called denticles. Behind the palate, the basisphenoid bone (which forms the floor of the braincase) is long and narrows toward the front. This is another distinguishing characteristic of Yonghesuchus, as other early archosauriforms have shorter and wider basisphenoid bones. Moreover, the entrance of the internal carotid artery, which passes through a foramen in the basisphenoid to supply blood to the brain, is in a different position than related genera. Its position is more similar to that of Dorosuchus (a euparkeriid) and more derived archosauriforms.

In the lower jaw, the dentary bone has two projections at its posterior end where it attaches to the mandible, the higher one being markedly longer than the lower one. The high projection comprises much of the upper margin of the mandibular fenestra, an opening along the side of the jaw. The mandibular fenestra is longer and narrower than those of related archosauriforms such as Turfanosuchus, Euparkeria, and Ornithosuchus. At the back of the jaw is the retroarticular region, which extends backward from the jaw joint. On the dorsal surface of this region on the articular bone is a prominent ridge that is not seen in other archosauriforms. There is a wing-like projection on the medial, or inner, surface of the articular which is called the medial process. This process is also seen in sphenosuchian crocodylomorphs and rauisuchians.

Yonghesuchus, like Turfanosuchus, has small, compressed, recurved premaxillary teeth in the front of the upper jaw. The maxillary teeth are larger, more compressed, and serrated. The largest of these are the fourth and fifth maxillary teeth (the ninth and tenth teeth from the tip of the jaw). Teeth behind these get progressively smaller and end below the orbit, or eye socket.

The cervical vertebrae, which are only known in the paratype, are amphicoelous, meaning that they are concave at both ends. These vertebrae bear small ribs that are similar to other archosauriformes, including crocodyliforms.

== Classification ==
Yonghesuchus was not considered to be a crown-group archosaur, but rather a closely related advanced archosauriform. One feature that was considered to exclude it from Archosauria was its palatal teeth, which are generally absent in archosaurs (but are known to vary in other clades). Yonghesuchus was considered to be more closely related to archosaurs than the related family Proterochampsidae based on the position of the foramen for the carotid artery on the basisphenoid bone, which in Yonghesuchus was presumably more similar to that seen in archosaurs. The position of the foramen has also been an indication that Yonghesuchus is more closely related to archosaurs than Turfanosuchus, which has a foramen in a position that is plesiomorphic in archosauriformes and similar to proterochampsids.

Xu et al. (2001), the first to describe Yonghesuchus, suggested that among non-archosaurian archosauriformes, Yonghesuchus was the most closely related, followed by Proterochampsidae, Turfanosuchus, and Euparkeria. Xu et al. supported this claim with the geological position of these taxa, which are successively older from Yonghesuchus (early Late Triassic) to Euparkeria (late Early Triassic). A later phylogenetic analysis on basal archosauriforms by Dilkes and Sues (2009) placed proterochampsids in a more basal position than Turfanosuchus and Yonghesuchus, which were considered successive sister taxa to Archosauria.

In most recent analyses, Yonghesuchus has been recovered as in a well supported clade, the Gracilisuchidae within the Pseudosuchia, along with Gracilisuchus and Turfanosuchus.
