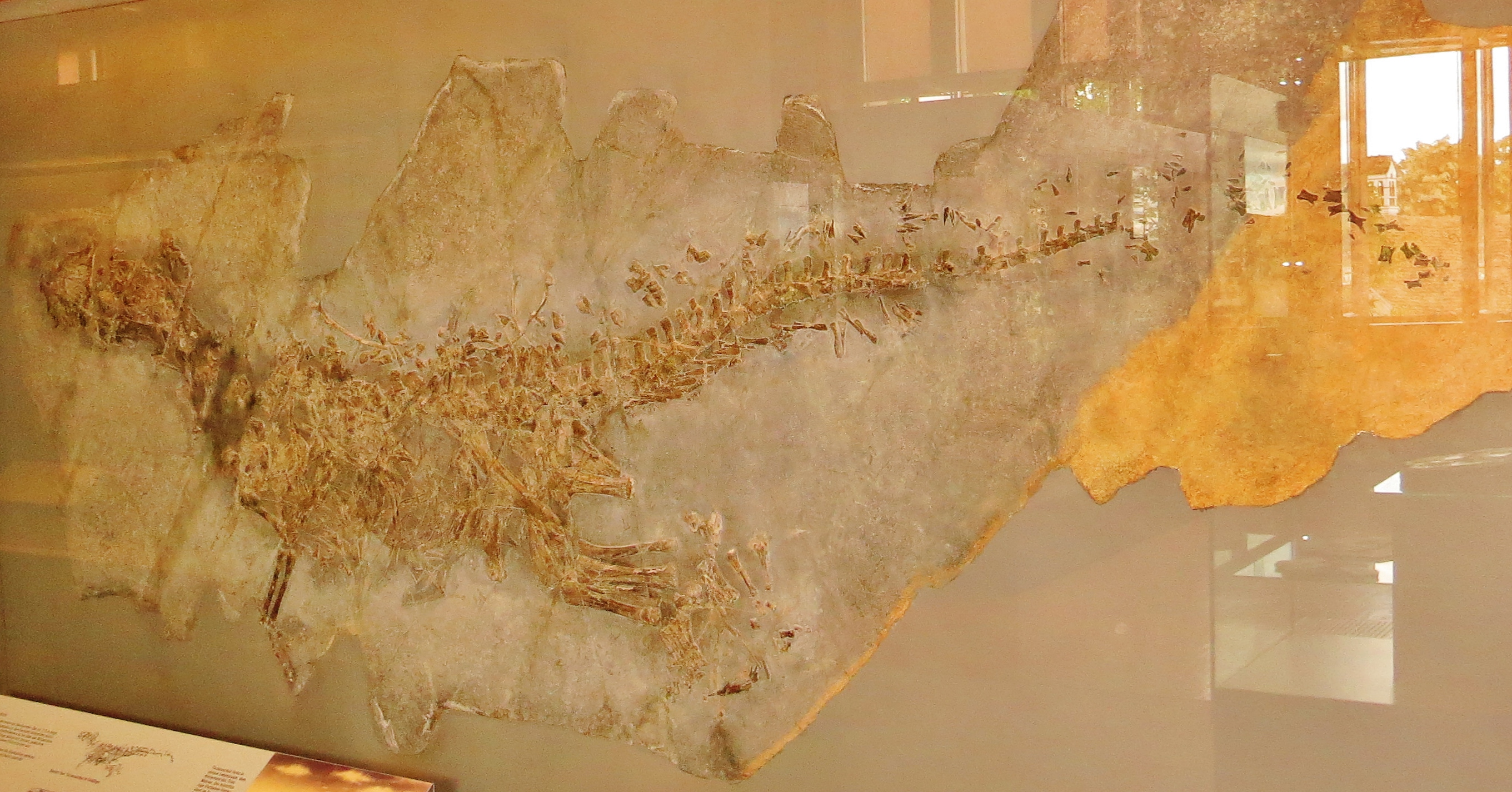
- Holotype of Ticinosuchus ferox at the Natural History Museum of the University of Zurich

Scientific classification
- Kingdom: Animalia
- Phylum: Chordata
- Class: Reptilia
- Clade: Archosauria
- Clade: Pseudosuchia
- Clade: Suchia
- Genus: †Ticinosuchus; Krebs, 1965
- Species: †T. ferox

Binomial name
- †Ticinosuchus ferox Krebs, 1965

= Ticinosuchus =

Ticinosuchus Temporal range: Middle Triassic, Anisian–Ladinian

Extinct species of reptile

Ticinosuchus is an extinct genus of suchian archosaur (distantly related to modern crocodilians) from the Middle Triassic (Anisian–Ladinian) of Switzerland and Italy. The genus name means "Ticino crocodile" due to its origin from the Swiss canton Ticino. It is one of the only terrestrial animals found in the Besano Formation, a fossil-rich lagerstätte on Monte San Giorgio renowned for its marine fauna (including different groups of fossil fishes, ichthyosaurs, tanystropheids, nothosaurs and placodonts, among others).

== Description ==
The holotype specimen of Ticinosuchus is composed of a largely complete and articulated skeleton, collected in separate pieces that were later reassembled. It was a medium-sized (2.5 metres (8 ft 2 in) long), quadrupedal carnivore covered in osteoderms.

=== Skull ===
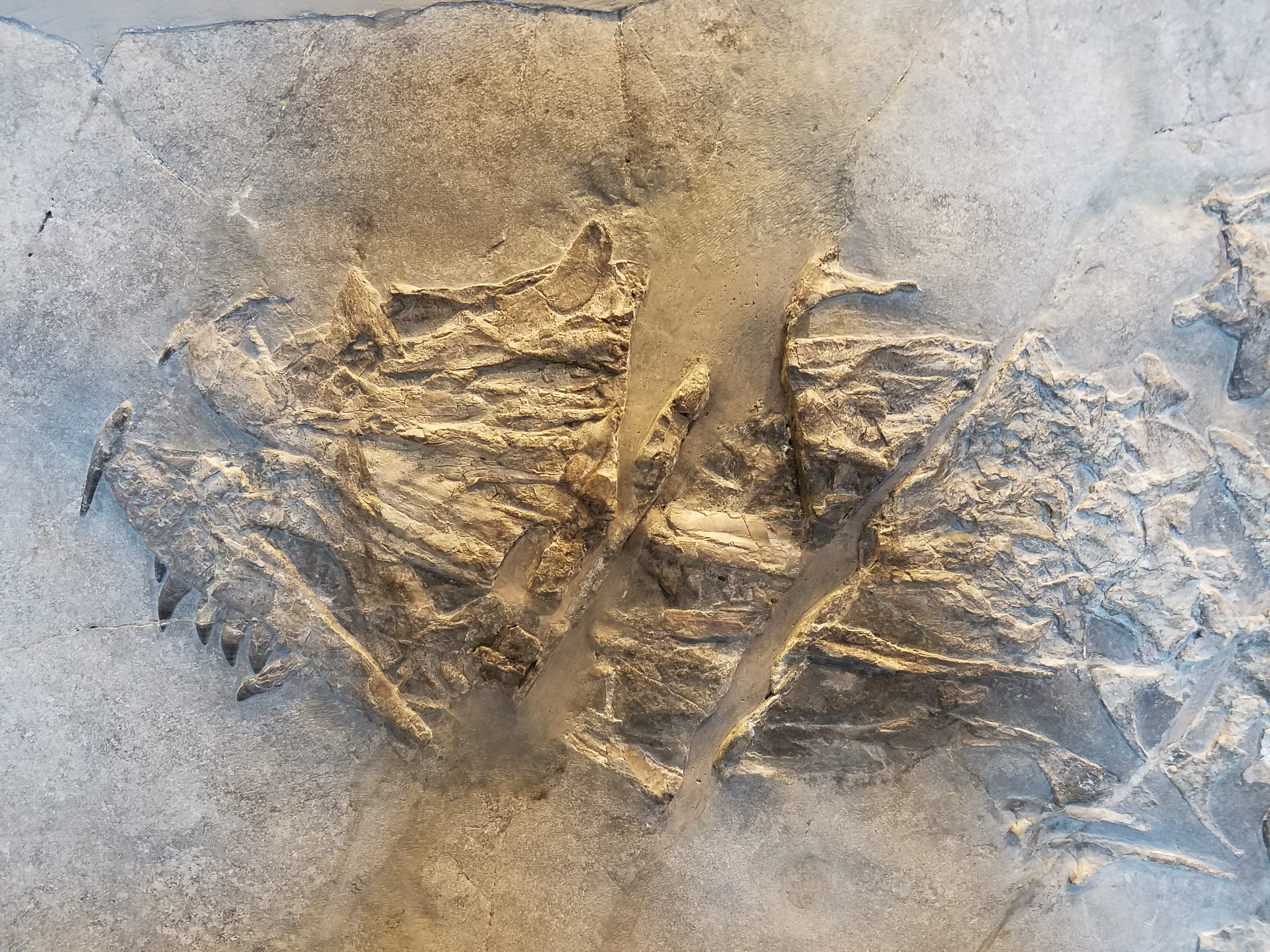
Broken skull of the holotype

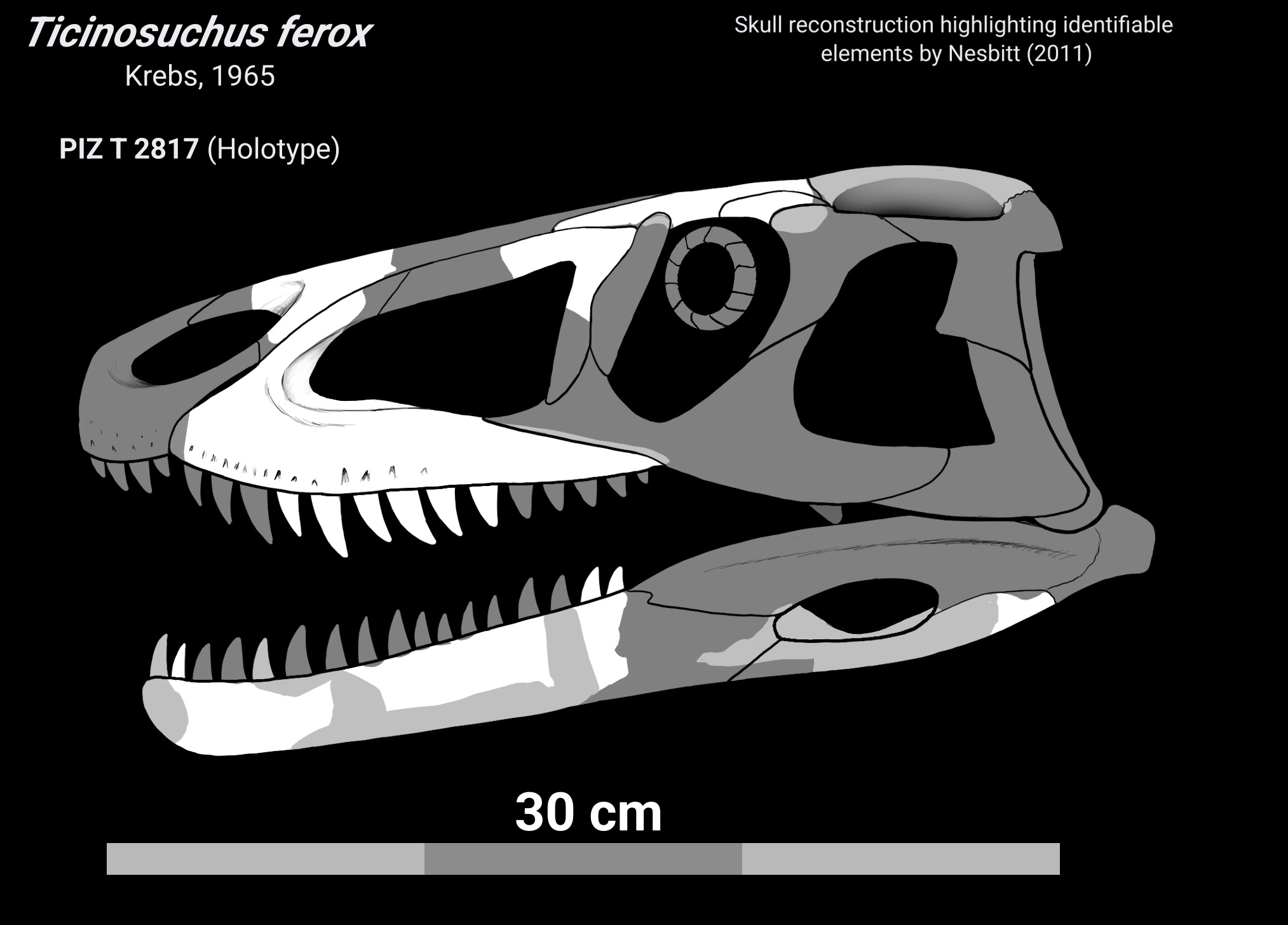
Diagram of the identifiable elements

Unfortunately, the skull is the least well preserved part of the holotype. It is largely crushed and disarticulated, with bones overlapping each other making identification of the elements difficult. In addition, when the component slabs of the fossil were first assembled, a slab of the fragments from the right side of the skull was inserted in between fragments exposed on the left side. As a result, the fossil's skull region appears to be longer than it would have been in life. Nonetheless, some elements can be identified, like sharp and recurved teeth indicating a carnivorous diet, a complete maxilla, a partial lacrimal, nasal, some bones of the skull roof, most of an elongated dentary's outline, and other bones of the lower jaw.

=== Postcranial skeleton ===
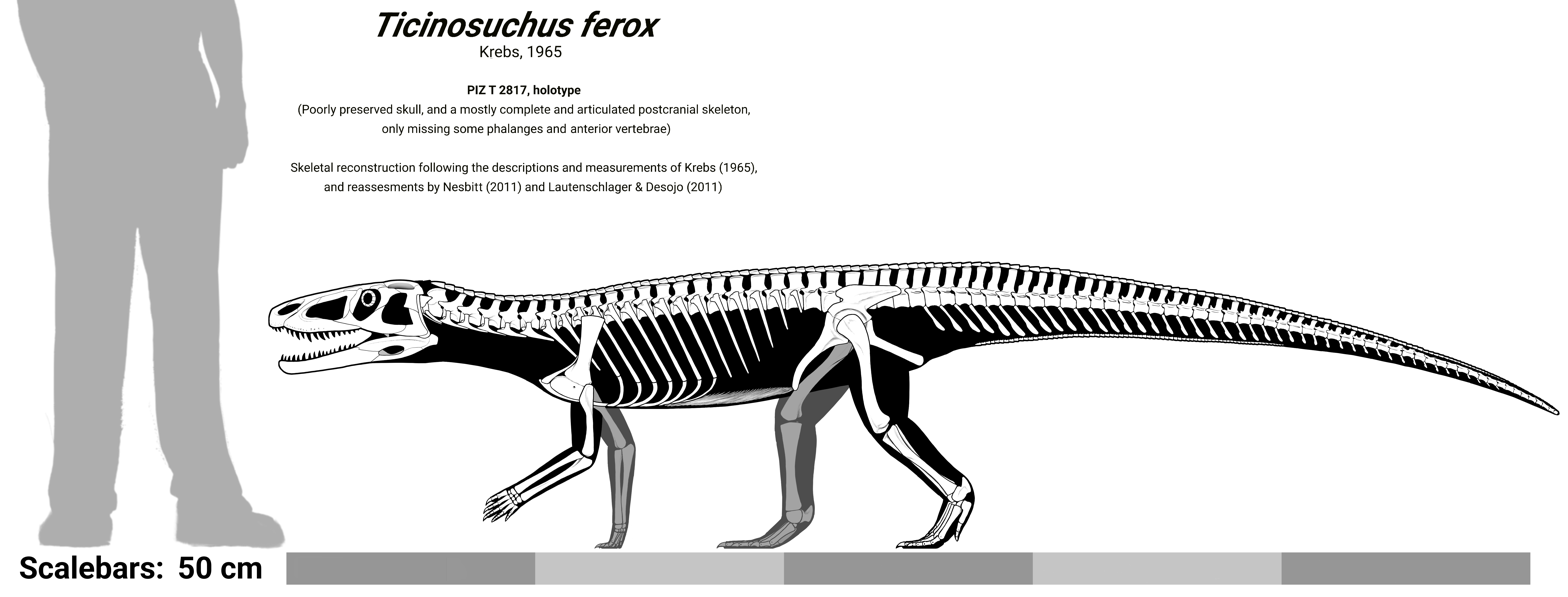
Skeletal reconstruction of Ticinosuchus with a size comparison

Most of the body is preserved, 19 presacral vertebrae (6 cervical and 13 dorsal) can be observed, but there is a noticeable gap of missing ones (likely 5) in the transition between these. Most of the cervical ones were elongated, with centra twice as long as they were tall. The trunk (dorsal) ones became taller and more robust as they approached the sacrum, followed by 2 sacral vertebrae supporting the pelvis, and then a total of 55 tail (caudal) vertebrae that started relatively robust, and diminished in size posteriorly. The middle caudal vertebrae possessed an extra, bony projection in front of their neural spines, likely for extra ligamentous attachments, an anatomical feature shared with a select few relatives like Rauisuchus and Batrachotomus.

The cervical ribs articulated with each other, and some of the dorsal ribs possessed a blunt end that would have attached sternal ribs. Most of the tail possessed chevrons that were expanded at their lower ends.

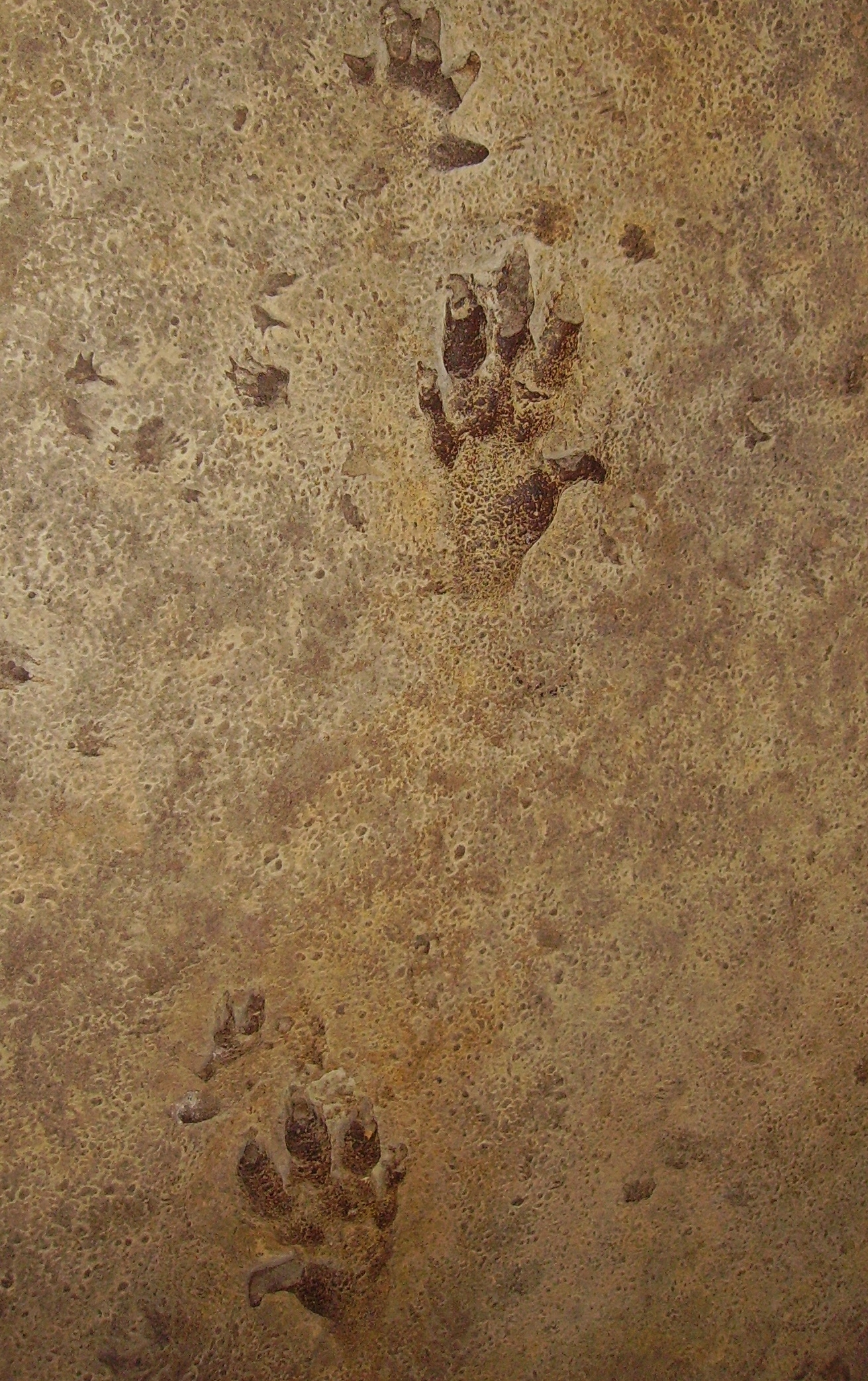
Cheirotherium trace fossil, which might have been made by Ticinosuchus

Various elements of the pectoral and pelvic girdles were elongated and lightly built, as well as the forelimbs and the slightly larger hindlimbs, both of which possessed 5 digits. Key aspects of its anatomy that are shared with other archosaur relatives indicated a fully erect, quadrupedal gait. With all 4 limbs lifting the body from below, resembling a mammal's locomotion. The footprints expected from an animal like Ticinosuchus greatly resemble those of the ichnogenus Chirotherium. The dorsal midline of the animal, from the start of the neck to the end of the tail, was covered by osteoderms. Starting with two rows of small, posteriorly-overlapping osteoderms next to each other, each with a dorsal ridge. These were in an arrangement of roughly two pairs of osteoderms per vertebrae, which posteriorly became just one row at the start of the tail, until diminishing in size to the end. The ventral side of its tail also possessed a singular row of small overlapping osteoderms after the cloaca.

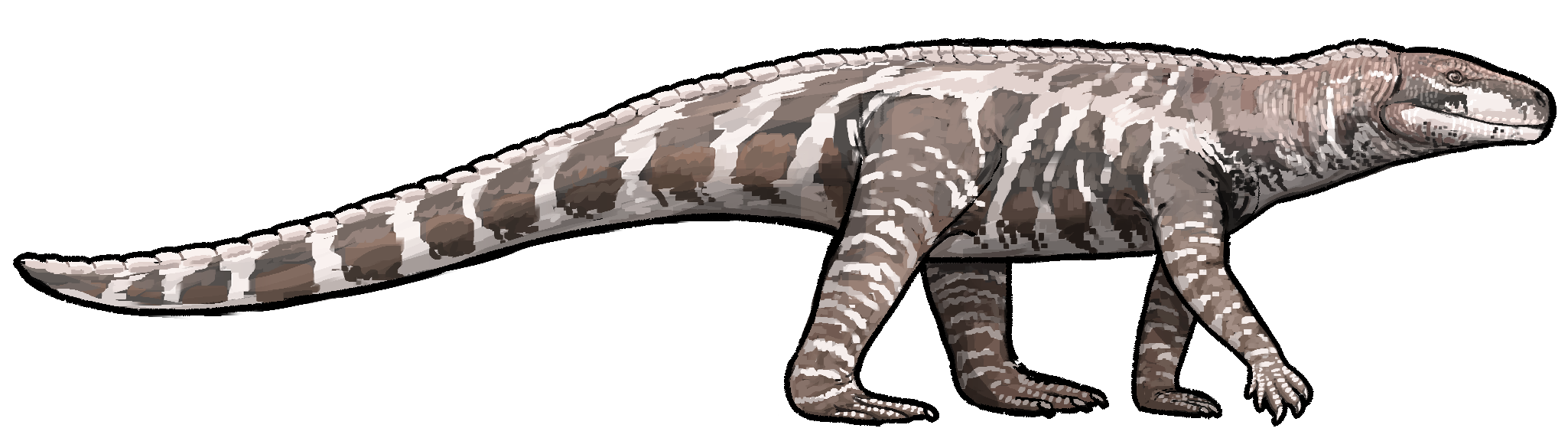
Life restoration

=== Ecology ===
The remains of the last meal in the holotype of Ticinosuchus have been preserved as a high concentration of fish scales near the pelvis/tail region. This may suggest a piscivorous (fish-eating) diet, which might explain the occurrence of a terrestrial animal in a coastal and marine formation.
