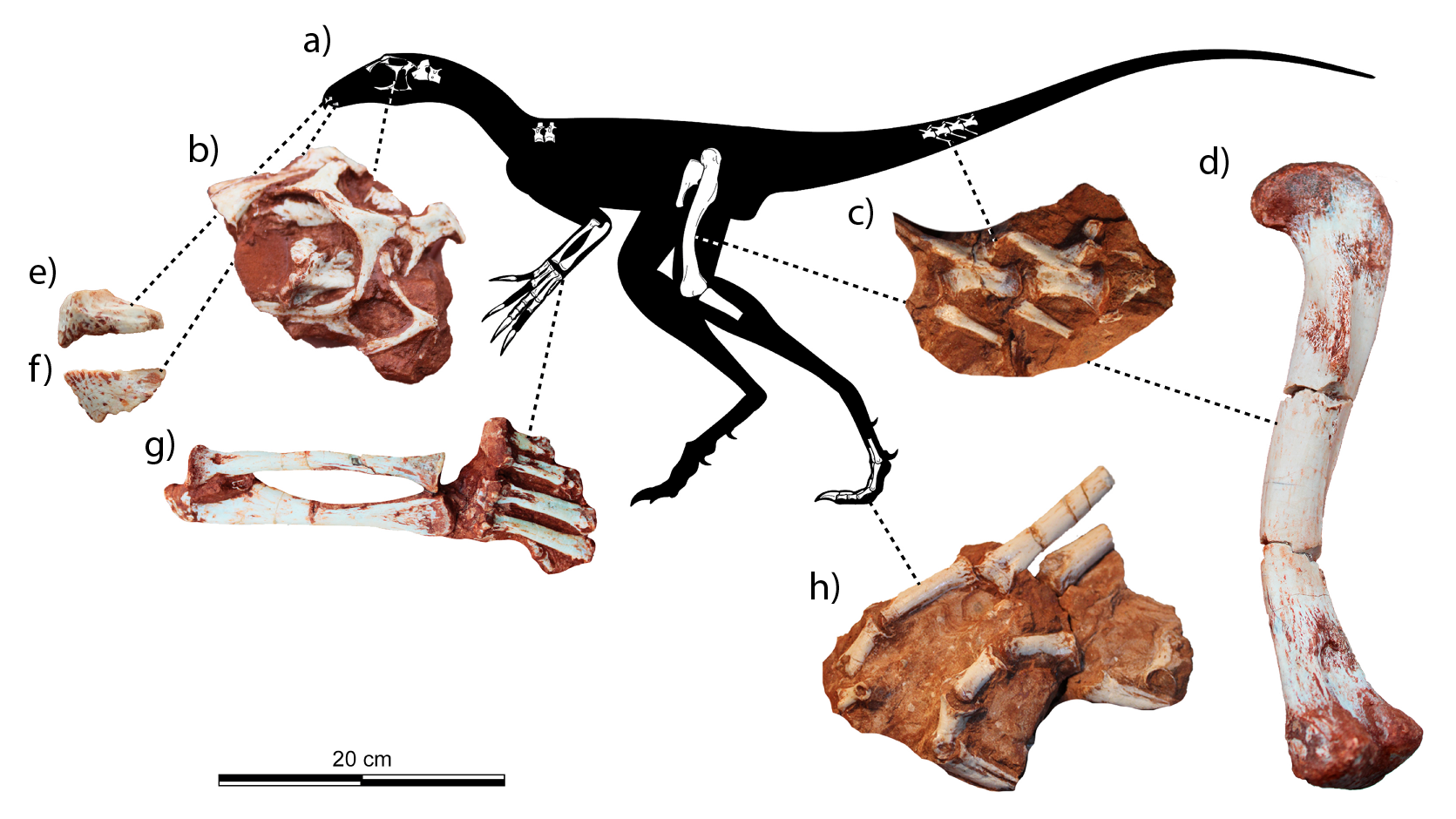
- Reconstructed skeleton and photographs of the holotype

Scientific classification
- Kingdom: Animalia
- Phylum: Chordata
- Class: Reptilia
- Clade: †Pterosauromorpha
- Family: †Lagerpetidae
- Genus: †Venetoraptor; Müller et al., 2023
- Species: †V. gassenae

Binomial name
- †Venetoraptor gassenae Müller et al., 2023

= Venetoraptor =

Venetoraptor Temporal range: Late Triassic (Carnian)

Genus of lagerpetid archosaurs

Venetoraptor (meaning "Vale Vêneto plunderer") is an extinct genus of lagerpetid archosaurs from the Late Triassic Santa Maria Formation (Paraná Basin) of Rio Grande do Sul, Brazil. The genus contains a single species, V. gassenae, known from a partial skeleton. Venetoraptor is characterized by the presence of a beak and scythe-like claws on long fingers.

== Discovery and naming ==
Venetoraptor type locality in Rio Grande do Sul, Brazil

The Venetoraptor holotype specimen, CAPPA/UFSM 0356, was discovered in the Santa Maria Formation (Hyperodapedon Assemblage Zone) in the Paraná Basin of São João do Polêsine in Rio Grande do Sul, Brazil. The partially-articulated specimen consists of an incomplete skull, cervical, dorsal, and caudal vertebrae, a partial pelvic girdle, and elements of the arms and legs.

In 2023, Müller et al. described Venetoraptor gassenae as a new genus and species of lagerpetid archosaur based on these fossil remains. The generic name, "Venetoraptor", combines a reference to the tourist locality "Vale Vêneto" with the Latin word "raptor", meaning "plunderer". The specific name, "gassenae", honors Valserina M. B. Gassen, a founder of the paleontology center at the Federal University of Santa Maria.

== Description ==
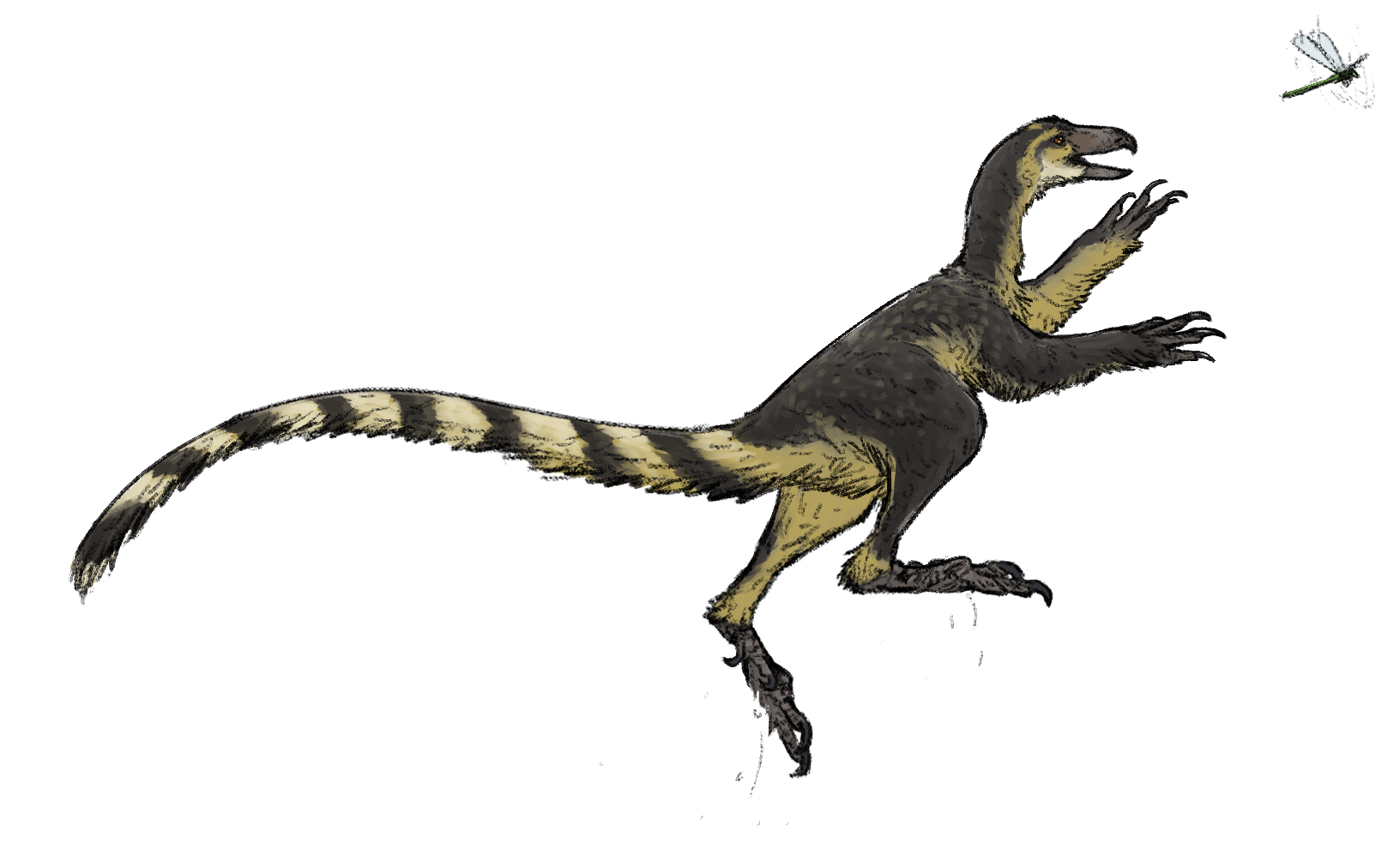
Speculative life restoration

Size compared to a human

Venetoraptor is estimated at 96.1 centimetres (37.8 in) long, and 33.4 centimetres (13.1 in) tall at the hip. The premaxilla is toothless with a sharp, pointed end comparable to the beaks of phorusrhacids and falconiforms. The surface of the premaxilla bears striations, which may indicate the presence of a rhamphotheca or similar keratinous covering in life. The tip of the dentary is similarly textured, and may have also been covered in keratin. It is unknown if Venetoraptor had teeth in the rest of its mouth. The length of the metacarpals increases in length from digits I to IV, like the dinosauriform Saltopus and many pterosaurs. In the more closely related Scleromochlus and Dromomeron romeri, metacarpal III is the longest. The hands of Venetoraptor bear long, scythe-like claws. Like other lagerpetids as well as early pterosaurs, its vertebrae are proportionately short.

== Paleobiology ==
The recurved beak and grasping hands with large claws of Venetoraptor may indicate a scansorial lifestyle, allowing it to climb and consume food more easily. Birds with raptor-like beaks are more adapted for tearing flesh and the consumption of hard fruit. However, whether the diet of Venetoraptor followed similar trends is unknown. Details of the arms and legs support the loss of obligatory quadrupedalism in Venetoraptor and its relatives, so a bipedal lifestyle is more likely.

== Classification ==
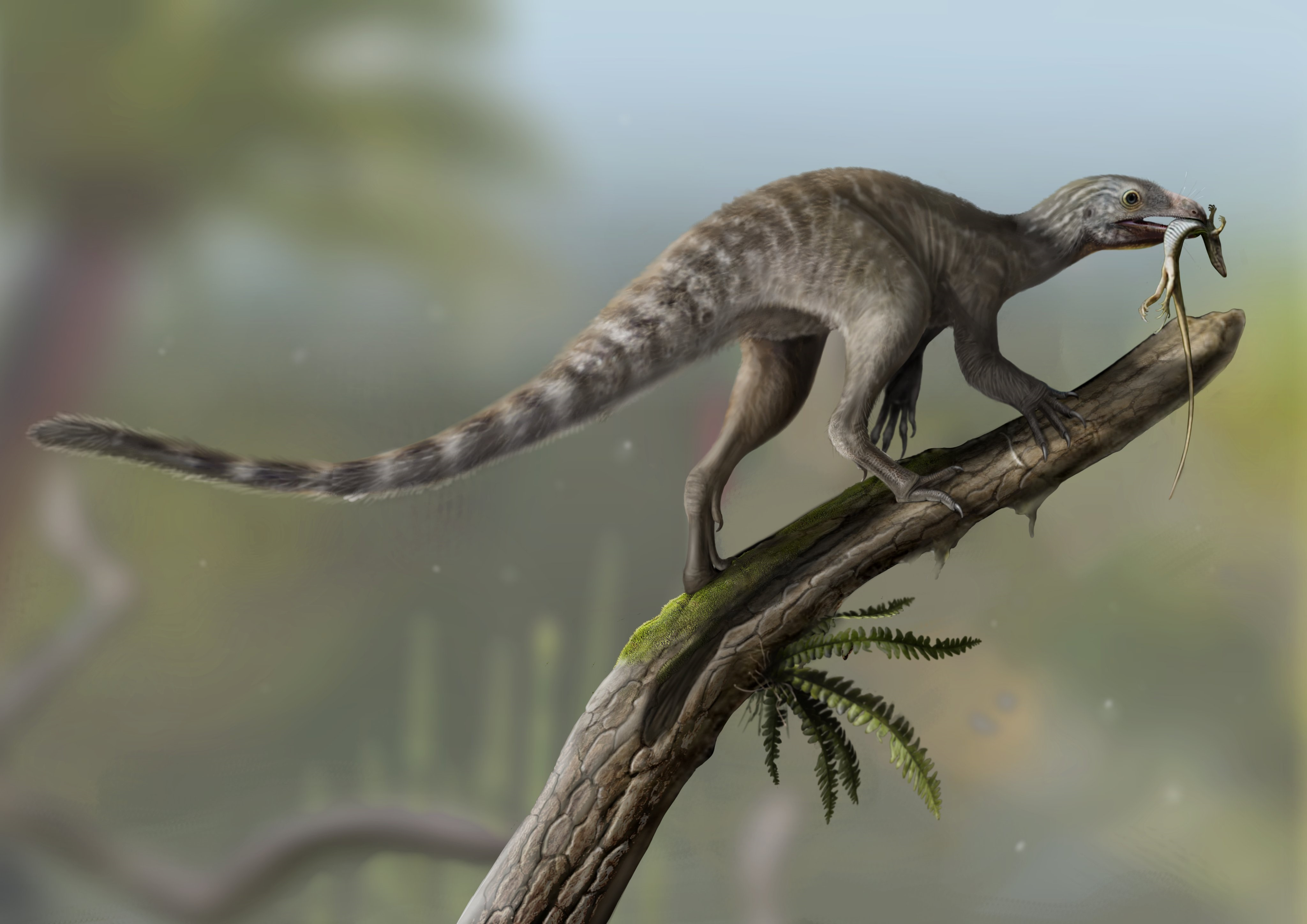
Speculative life restoration of Venetoraptor as a pterosaur 'precursor'

Müller et al. (2023) recovered Venetoraptor as a member of the pterosauromorph clade Lagerpetidae, as the sister taxon to "Dromomeron" gregorii. Ixalerpeton, which has also been found in the Santa Maria Formation, was recovered as the sister taxon to the clade containing D. romeri and D. gigas. The results of their phylogenetic analyses are shown in the cladogram below:

- Archosauria
  - Pseudosuchia
  - Pan-Aves
    - Aphanosauria
    - Ornithodira
      - - Lagosuchus
        - - Silesauridae
          - Dinosauria
      - Pterosauromorpha
        - Lagerpetidae
          - Faxinalipterus
          - - Scleromochlus
            - - Lagerpeton
              - - - Venetoraptor
                  - "Dromomeron" gregorii
                - - Ixalerpeton
                  - - Dromomeron romeri
                    - Dromomeron gigas
        - - Pterosauria

Using an updated phylogenetic dataset, Garcia & Müller (2025) found that lagerpetids formed a paraphyletic grade—rather than a monophyletic clade—towards Pterosauria, closing a pre-existing ghost lineage between pterosaurs and their precursor. Their analyses recovered Venetoraptor and "Dromomeron" gregorii in a clade as the closest relative of pterosaurs. An abbreviated version of these results is displayed in the cladogram below:

- - Faxinalipterus
  - Ornithodira
    - Dinosauromorpha
    - Pterosauromorpha
      - Kongonaphon
      - - Lagerpeton
        - - UFSM 11611
          - - Ixalerpeton
            - - PVSJ 883
              - - - Dromomeron gigas
                  - Dromomeron romeri
                - - - Venetoraptor
                    - "Dromomeron" gregorii
                  - - Pterosauria

== Paleoenvironment ==
Venetoraptor was discovered in layers of the Hyperodapedon Assemblage Zone within the Santa Maria Formation, which dates to the Carnian age of the Late Triassic period, about 233.23 million years old. Several other animals have been recovered from this locality, including the temnospondyl Compsocerops, several synapsids, pseudosuchians, avemetatarsalians (including various dinosaurs), and other reptiles.
