= Dinosaur classification =

Various classifications of Dinosauria

Classification of dinosaurs

Dinosaur classification began in 1842 when Sir Richard Owen placed Iguanodon, Megalosaurus, and Hylaeosaurus in "a distinct tribe or suborder of Saurian Reptiles, for which I would propose the name of Dinosauria." In 1887 and 1888 Harry Seeley divided dinosaurs into the two orders Saurischia and Ornithischia, based on their hip structure. These divisions have proved remarkably enduring, even through several seismic changes in the taxonomy of dinosaurs.

The largest change was prompted by entomologist Willi Hennig's work in the 1950s, which evolved into modern cladistics. For specimens known only from fossils, the rigorous analysis of characters to determine evolutionary relationships between different groups of animals (clades) proved incredibly useful. As computer-based cladistics matured in the 1990s, paleontologists were among the first zoologists to broadly adopt the system. Progressive scrutiny and work upon dinosaurian interrelationships, with the aid of new discoveries that have shed light on previously uncertain relationships between taxa, have begun to yield a stabilizing classification since the mid-2000s. While cladistics is the predominant classificatory system among paleontology professionals, the Linnean system is still in use, especially in works intended for popular distribution.

== Evolution ==
=== Evolutionary relationships ===
Up until 1985, dinosaurs were usually believed to be polyphyletic, with as many as six independent ancestors giving rise to the various groups popularly called "dinosaurs". However, beginning in 1974 and 1976 independent authors concluded that dinosaurs were a natural group containing both Ornithischia and Saurischia, which became generally accepted with cladistic studies in the 1980s, and is now considered a well-diagnosed clade, and significant among terrestrial vertebrates for the inclusion of birds. Birds and crocodiles are united amongst reptiles by multiple features of the skeleton, soft tissue, and molecular sequencing that separates them from other living vertebrates, with this group now named Archosauria. Dinosaurs form part of the bird-line of archosaurs along with several early Triassic forms, and pterosaurs, while the crocodile-line of archosaurs includes phytosaurs, prestosuchids, rauisuchids, poposaurids, and even ornithosuchids that had once been thought to be ancestral to birds. Originally, Archosauria also included a wide array of extinct reptiles such as rhynchocephalians and anomodonts, and then was modified to include crocodiles, birds, pterosaurs, dinosaurs and the Triassic groups Proterosuchidae and Erythrosuchidae with the earliest member being Archosaurus from the Permian. While some authors retain Archosauria for this more inclusive group, and use the name Avesuchia for the crown group uniting birds and crocodiles, others restrict Archosauria to the crown group and use Archosauriformes for the larger group including the extinct Triassic and Permian members. The placement of turtles relative to other living reptile groups is uncertain, they may form a close relationship with archosaurs, or a close relationship with lizards. Regardless, archosaurs diverged from lizards during the Permian, and each formed their own major clade of reptiles.

Triassic archosaurs, excluding crocodylomorphs, dinosaurs, and pterosaurs, have historically been referred to as thecodontians, though this group has been abandoned as excluding descendents. Early studies of the interrelationships of thecodonts suggested multiple varying arrangements such as the groups Proterosuchia, Parasuchia, and Pseudosuchia, but also Aetosauria, Sphenosuchia, Ornithosuchia and Rauisuchia. Large emphasis was placed on the anatomy of the ankle among these various taxa, identifying a primitive mesotarsal, crocodile-normal, or crocodile-reversed arrangement depending on the location of the hinging joint. Early archosaurs showed a primitive mesotarsal ankle, while crocodylomorphs, phytosaurs, aetosaurs and rauisuchians shared a crocodile-normal ankle, and ornithosuchids were unique in having a crocodile-reversed ankle. Pterosaurs and dinosaurs showed an advanced mesotarsal ankle. On this foundation, ornithosuchids were believed to be the earliest group along the bird-line of archosaurs, and the name Ornithosuchia was used. Restudy of the ankle anatomy and more in the 1990s removed ornithosuchids as one of the earliest crocodile-line archosaurs, leaving only Pterosauria, Dinosauria, and a handful of small Triassic taxa as bird-line archosaurs. Marasuchus and Lagerpeton, from the Triassic of South America, were believed to fall between pterosaurs and dinosaurs within the group Dinosauromorpha, and the Triassic taxon Scleromochlus could be found as either closer to pterosaurs or outside the group of pterosaurs and dinosaurs (Ornithodira) as an early member of Avemetatarsalia. There has also been the suggestion that pterosaurs were only believed to be close to dinosaurs because of convergence, and instead were outside Archosauria. The analysis below shows the evolution of dinosaurs as recovered by British palaeontologist Michael Benton in 2004, using his preferred clade names.

- Archosauria
  - Proterosuchus
  - - Erythrosuchus
    - - Euparkeria
      - - Proterochampsidae
        - Avesuchia
          - - Ornithosuchidae
            - - Gracilisuchus
              - Phytosauria
            - - Stagonolepididae
              - - Fasolasuchus
                - Prestosuchidae
              - - Postosuchus
                - Crocodylomorpha
          - - Scleromochlus
            - - Pterosauria
              - - Lagerpeton
                - - Marasuchus
                  - Dinosauria
                    - Ornithischia
                    - - Sauropodomorpha
                      - Theropoda

Despite the relative stability of the relationships of the avian stem, there have been few fossils found that display the transitional morphology of the early members, as most taxa known are either highly derived or poorly known. Thus in 2017 a new group of early avemetatarsalians was recognized, Aphanosauria, based primarily upon the anatomy of Teleocrater, the oldest member of the bird-line yet known. From this discovery, it was shown that the bauplan of early bird-line archosaurs was transitional between earlier archosaurs and dinosaurs, with a long neck, quadrupedality, and carnivory more similar to crocodile-line archosaurs and earlier archosauriformes than other avemetatarsalians. Teleocrater also displays a crocodile-normal ankle, showing it to be the ancestral morphology for all of Archosauria. Contrary to earlier studies, the crocodile-normal ankle can also be found on other bird-line archosaurs such as members of Silesauridae, Marasuchus, and even early dinosaurs. Aphanosaurs were widespread across Pangaea like early crocodile-line archosaurs during the Middle Triassic, and their presence shows that the anatomy of small, bipedal taxa like Marasuchus and Lagerpeton were not similar to the ancestral bird-line morphology. Similarly, it has since been recognized that Lagerpeton and other members of Lagerpetidae were not along the dinosaur-line of avemetatarsalians (also called Pan-Aves) but instead were sister to pterosaurs within Pterosauromorpha. While previous knowledge for the group was based upon vertebral, pelvic, and limb material, the discoveries of additional forelimb and cranial specimens show many shared features in the brain, teeth, jaws, and limbs that instead supports lagerpetids as relatives of pterosaurs rather than dinosaurs. At the same time, silesaurids, which had for a while been treated as the sister-group to dinosaurs, were instead suggested to be members of Ornithischia giving rise to later "traditional" ornithischians. This would extend the earliest records of dinosaurs into the Middle Triassic with the silesaur Asilisaurus, and fill up the near-absence of ornithischians from the entire Triassic.

=== Origins ===
Following the Permian-Triassic extinction event, as many as 60% of tetrapod "families" died out and ecosystems were devastated. The Late Permian food webs consisted of numerous large herbivores and carnivores, with only two or three species of dicynodonts and smaller diapsids surviving into the Triassic. Proterosuchids can be seen to have survived from the presence of Archosaurus in the Permian and Proterosuchus in the Triassic, and other early archosaur relatives such as Erythrosuchus and Euparkeria can also be seen in the Early Triassic. Other erythrosuchids are present in the Early Triassic, and in the Middle Triassic the archosauriform group Proterochampsidae can first be seen in South America. Archosaur diversity increased substantially in the Middle Triassic through the expansion into different ecological niches, with prestosuchids, poposaurids and other "rauisuchians" becoming large predators through the mid to late Triassic. Superficially-crocodilian phytosaurs appeared in the Late Triassic, as well as the bipedal, carnivorous ornithosuchids and the herbivorous and heavily-armoured stagonolepidids. Among bird-line archosaurs, Scleromochlus appeared in the Late Triassic of Scotland, as well as pterosaurs such as Eudimorphodon that already show a highly-derived anatomy for flight. The basal dinosauromorphs Lagerpeton and Marasuchus are known from the Middle Triassic, of similar small (1.3 m (4.3 ft)) size and agility. The earliest known clear dinosaurs are from the Carnian of the Late Triassic, particularly in the Ischigualasto Formation of Argentina but also possibly from a similar age across Brazil, India, Morocco, the US, and Scotland.

There are two ways of interpreting the diversification of dinosaurs in the Late Triassic: either they opportunistically radiated after the mass extinction, or they outcompeted over a longer timespan the mammal-like reptiles, rhynchosaurs, or crocodile-line archosaurs. During the time dinosaurs were not believed to be a natural group, their appearance was interpreted to be the result of competitive pressures, beginning in the Middle Triassic and showing advanced physiological adaptations like an erect gait or warm-bloodedness. It is possible that the origin of dinosaurs was opportunistic on the basis of their relatively rapid appearance and diversification in the Carnian and were rare until an extinction at the end of that epoch when dominant herbivore groups died out. There is evidence for a large environmental change at the end of the Carnian with turnovers in marine communities, the appearance of a conifer-fauna in the southern hemisphere over the previous Dicroidium-fauna, and a shift to arid climates.

Substantial advancements in the understanding of the Late Triassic show that the diversification of dinosaurs, termed the "dinosaur diversification event", occurred as a gradual but asynchronous replacement of therapsid and pseudosuchian faunas over around 20 million years beginning with the Carnian Pluvial Episode around 233 mya. The earliest stages of the dinosaur diversification remain poorly understood due to the limited sample of available geological formations that preserve both the initial radiation and subsequent takeover through the Carnian and Norian of the Triassic, with the Ischigualasto Formation remaining one of the few locations from which this succession can be observed. Small-sized dinosaurs underwent significant diversification when first appearing immediately following the end of the Carnian Pluvial Episode resulting in an arid to semi-arid climate in an abrupt shift. After this aridification, the climate transitioned to become humid again with a stabilization in the decreasing precipitation patterns. The return to humidity corresponds with the extinction of the abundant rhynchosaur Hyperodapedon as well as a significant decrease in the abundance and diversity of dinosaurs that persists until a return to semi-arid conditions in the mid-Norian. This evidence from the Ischigualasto and Los Colorados Formations supports a complex scenario where an earliest dinosaur diversification is hindered by a decline due to climatic changes before dinosaurs displayed dominance over terrestrial ecosystems for the remainder of the Mesozoic.

=== Later evolution ===
As birds are the most diverse groups of tetrapods, the evolutionary continuum from the first dinosaurs to modern birds can be described through the acquisition of numerous features throughout dinosaur evolution. Though extinct dinosaurs are often described as "non-avian" to distinguish them from birds, many groups of theropods have specifically been created to unite extinct taxa with modern birds and the boundary between dinosaurs and birds is arbitrary. The last common ancestor of birds and crocodiles was likely a quadrupedal but semi-erect predator with recurved teeth, scaly skin, and osteoderms as in most Triassic archosauriforms. Over the next 60 million years, roughly 40-45% of key avian features were evolved. Osteoderms were lost very early among the bird-line archosaurs, and simple forms of filamentous feathers evolved before becoming more complex branching and vaned structures among early coelurosaurs. Vertebrae were progressively pneumatized during this time, and the tail segmented into a distinct flexible region and stiff tail tip. Obligate bipedalism was also evolved, with the leg and pelvis both developing an erect posture and three-toed foot prior to the evolution of theropods. This bipedal stance allowed for carnivory and grasping with the hands, giving rise to the eventual three-fingered hand largely unique to birds.

During the next phase of avian evolution in the Jurassic, there was a higher rate of morphological change and dramatic increase in avian features. Most significantly, there is a miniaturization and corresponding rise in paedomorphic anatomy, with most coelurosaur lineages evolving during this phase of avian evolution. This rapid diversification can be described as an exploration of available niches previously unoccupied by theropods, including a transition away from carnivory to omnivory. There was also a re-organization of the central nervous system and elongation of the arm. The muscles of the leg reduced, as well as the length of the tail, both of which may correlate to adaptations for a more densely-vegetated habitat including possible arboreality. Bird ancestors developed more advanced feathers that may have been for sexual selection as well as aerodynamics, with signs for the development of scansorial habits and debates about flight ability.

The last main phase of avian evolution took place during the Cretaceous, from the origins of the avian group Ornithothoraces up until modern birds. The rate of morphological change decreased, and fewer key avian features were developed, but the most significant trends are related to the development of powered flight. The keel evolved from the sternum of theropods and the bones of the pectoral girdle rearranged to support larger flight muscles, while simultaneously many other regions of the skeleton fused into single bony units or were lost (such as teeth). This gradual evolution of birds among dinosaurs is filled with ecomorphological transitions both prior to and following Archaeopteryx, without large discontinuities separating birds from their dinosaur ancestors.

== Benton classification ==
As most dinosaur paleontologists have advocated a shift away from traditional, ranked Linnaean taxonomy in favor of rankless phylogenetic systems, few ranked taxonomies of dinosaurs have been published since the 1980s. The following schema is among the most recent, from the third edition of Vertebrate Palaeontology, a respected undergraduate textbook. While it is structured so as to reflect evolutionary relationships (similar to a cladogram), it also retains the traditional ranks used in Linnaean taxonomy. The classification has been updated from the second edition in 2000 to reflect new research, but remains fundamentally conservative.

Michael Benton classifies all dinosaurs within the Series Amniota, Class Sauropsida, Subclass Diapsida, Infraclass Archosauromorpha, Division Archosauria, Subdivision Avemetatarsalia, Infradivision Ornithodira, and Superorder Dinosauria. Dinosauria is then divided into the two traditional orders, Saurischia and Ornithischia. The dagger (†) is used to indicate taxa with no living members.

=== Order Saurischia ===
- Suborder Theropoda
  - †Infraorder Herrerasauria
  - †Infraorder Coelophysoidea
  - †Infraorder Ceratosauria+
    - †Parvorder Neoceratosauria+
      - †Superfamily Abelisauroidea
        - †Family Abelisauridae
        - †Family Noasauridae
      - †Family Ceratosauridae
  - Infraorder Tetanurae
    - †Superfamily Megalosauroidea
      - †Family Megalosauridae
      - †Family Spinosauridae
    - †Parvorder Carnosauria
      - †Superfamily Allosauroidea
        - †Family Allosauridae
        - †Family Carcharodontosauridae
        - †Family Neovenatoridae
        - †Family Metriacanthosauridae
    - Parvorder Coelurosauria
      - †Family Coeluridae
      - Division Maniraptoriformes
        - †Family Tyrannosauridae
        - †Family Ornithomimidae
        - Subdivision Maniraptora
          - †Family Alvarezsauridae
          - †Family Therizinosauridae
          - †Infradivision Deinonychosauria
            - †Family Troodontidae
            - †Family Dromaeosauridae
          - Class Aves
- †Suborder Sauropodomorpha
  - †Genus Thecodontosaurus
  - †Family Plateosauridae
  - †Genus Riojasaurus
  - †Family Massospondylidae
  - †Infraorder Sauropoda
    - †Family Vulcanodontidae
    - †Family Omeisauridae
    - †Parvorder Neosauropoda
      - †Family Cetiosauridae
      - †Family Diplodocidae
      - †Division Macronaria
        - †Family Camarasauridae
        - †Subdivision Titanosauriformes
          - †Family Brachiosauridae
          - †Infradivision Somphospondyli
            - †Family Euhelopodidae
            - †Family Titanosauridae

=== †Order Ornithischia ===
- †Family Pisanosauridae
- †Family Fabrosauridae
- †Suborder Thyreophora
  - †Family Scelidosauridae
  - †Infraorder Stegosauria
    - †Family Huayangosauridae
    - †Family Stegosauridae
  - †Infraorder Ankylosauria
    - †Family Nodosauridae
    - †Family Ankylosauridae
- †Suborder Cerapoda
  - †Infraorder Pachycephalosauria
  - †Infraorder Ceratopsia
    - †Family Psittacosauridae
    - †Family Protoceratopsidae
    - †Family Ceratopsidae
  - †Infraorder Ornithopoda
    - †Family Heterodontosauridae
    - †Family Hypsilophodontidae
    - †Family Iguanodontidae *
    - †Family Hadrosauridae

== Weishampel / Dodson / Osmólska classification ==
The following is based on the second edition of The Dinosauria, a compilation of articles by experts in the field that provided the most comprehensive coverage of Dinosauria available when it was first published in 1990. The second edition updates and revises that work.

The cladogram and phylogenetic definitions below reflect the current understanding of evolutionary relationships. The taxa and symbols in parentheses after a given taxa define these relationships. The plus symbol ("+") between taxa indicates the given taxa is a node-based clade, defined as comprising all descendants of the last common ancestor of the "added" taxa. The greater-than symbol (">") indicates the given taxon is a stem-based taxon, comprising all organisms sharing a common ancestor that is not also an ancestor of the "lesser" taxon.

=== Saurischia ===
(Triceratops/Stegosaurus)

- Herrerasauria (Herrerasaurus > Liliensternus, Plateosaurus)
  - Herrerasauridae (Herrerasaurus + Staurikosaurus)
- ? Eoraptor lunensis
- Sauropodomorpha (Saltasaurus > Theropoda)
  - ? Saturnalia tupiniquim
  - ? Thecodontosauridae
  - Prosauropoda (Plateosaurus > Sauropoda)
    - ? Thecodontosauridae
    - ? Anchisauria (Anchisaurus + Melanorosaurus)
      - ? Anchisauridae (Anchisaurus > Melanorosaurus)
      - ? Melanorosauridae (Melanorosaurus > Anchisaurus)
    - Plateosauria (Jingshanosaurus + Plateosaurus)
      - Massospondylidae
      - Yunnanosauridae
      - Plateosauridae (Plateosaurus > Yunnanosaurus, Massospondylus)
  - Sauropoda (Saltasaurus > Plateosaurus)
    - ? Anchisauridae
    - ? Melanorosauridae
    - Blikanasauridae
    - Vulcanodontidae
    - Eusauropoda (Shunosaurus + Saltasaurus)
      - ? Euhelopodidae
      - Mamenchisauridae
      - Cetiosauridae (Cetiosaurus > Saltasaurus)
      - Neosauropoda (Diplodocus + Saltasaurus)
        - Diplodocoidea (Diplodocus > Saltasaurus)
          - Rebbachisauridae (Rebbachisaurus > Diplodocus)
          - Flagellicaudata
            - Dicraeosauridae (Dicraeosaurus > Diplodocus)
            - Diplodocidae (Diplodocus > Dicraeosaurus, Apatosaurus)
        - Macronaria (Saltasaurus > Diplodocus)
          - ? Jobaria tiguidensis
          - Camarasauromorpha (Camarasaurus + Saltasaurus)
            - Camarasauridae
            - Titanosauriformes (Brachiosaurus + Saltasaurus)
              - Brachiosauridae (Brachiosaurus > Saltasaurus)
              - Titanosauria (Saltasaurus > Brachiosaurus)
                - Andesauridae
                - Lithostrotia (Malawisaurus + Saltasaurus)
                  - Isisaurus colberti
                  - Paralititan stromeri
                  - Nemegtosauridae
                  - Saltasauridae (Opisthocoelicaudia + Saltasaurus)
- Theropoda (Passer domesticus > Cetiosaurus oxoniensis)
  - ? Eoraptor lunensis
  - ? Herrerasauridae
  - Ceratosauria (Ceratosaurus nasicornis > Aves)
    - ? Coelophysoidea (Coelophysis > Ceratosaurus)
      - ? Dilophosaurus wetherilli
      - Coelophysidae (Coelophysis + Megapnosaurus)
    - ? Neoceratosauria (Ceratosaurus > Coelophysis)
      - Ceratosauridae
      - Abelisauroidea (Carnotaurus sastrei > C. nasicornis)
        - Abelisauria (Noasaurus + Carnotaurus)
          - Noasauridae
          - Abelisauridae (Abelisaurus comahuensis + C. sastrei)
            - Carnotaurinae (Carnotaurus > Abelisaurus)
            - Abelisaurinae (Abelisaurus > Carnotaurus)
  - Tetanurae (P. domesticus > C. nasicornis)
    - ? Spinosauroidea (Spinosaurus aegyptiacus > P. domesticus)
      - Megalosauridae (Megalosaurus bucklandii > P. domesticus, S. aegyptiacus, Allosaurus fragilis)
        - Megalosaurinae (M. bucklandii > Eustreptospondylus oxoniensis)
        - Eustreptospondylinae (E. oxoniensis > M. bucklandii)
      - Spinosauridae (S. aegyptiacus > P. domesticus, M. bucklandii, A. fragilis)
        - Baryonychinae (Baryonyx walkeri > S. aegyptiacus)
        - Spinosaurinae (S. aegyptiacus > B. walkeri)
    - Avetheropoda (A. fragilis + P. domesticus)
      - Carnosauria (A. fragilis > Aves)
        - ? Spinosauroidea
        - Monolophosaurus jiangi
        - Allosauroidea (A. fragilis + Sinraptor dongi)
          - Allosauridae (A. fragilis > S. dongi, Carcharodontosaurus saharicus)
          - Sinraptoridae (S. dongi > A. fragilis, C. saharicus)
          - Carcharodontosauridae (C. saharicus > A. fragilis, S. dongi)
      - Coelurosauria (P. domesticus > A. fragilis)
        - Compsognathidae (Compsognathus longipes > P. domesticus)
        - Proceratosaurus bradleyi
        - Ornitholestes hermanni
        - Tyrannoraptora (Tyrannosaurus rex + P. domesticus)
          - Coelurus fragilis
          - Tyrannosauroidea (T. rex > Ornithomimus velox, Deinonychus antirrhopus, A. fragilis)
            - Dryptosauridae
            - Tyrannosauridae (T. rex + Tarbosaurus bataar + Daspletosaurus torosus + Albertosaurus sarcophagus + Gorgosaurus libratus)
              - Tyrannosaurinae (T. rex > A. sarcophagus)
              - Albertosaurinae (A. sarcophagus > T. rex)
          - Maniraptoriformes (O. velox + P. domesticus)
            - Ornithomimosauria (Gallimimus bullatus + Ornithomimus edmontonicus + Pelecanimimus polyodon)
              - Harpymimidae
              - Garudimimidae
              - Ornithomimidae
            - Maniraptora (P. domesticus > O. velox)
              - Oviraptorosauria (Oviraptor philoceratops > P. domesticus)
                - Caenagnathoidea (O. philoceratops + Caenagnathus collinsi)
                  - Caenagnathidae (C. collinsi > O. philoceratops)
                  - Oviraptoridae (O. philoceratops > C. collinsi)
                    - Oviraptorinae (O. philoceratops + Citipati osmolskae)
                - Therizinosauroidea (Therizinosaurus + Beipiaosaurus)
                  - Alxasauridae
                  - Therizinosauridae
              - Paraves (P. domesticus > O. philoceratops)
                - Eumaniraptora (P. domesticus + D. antirrhopus)
                  - Deinonychosauria (D. antirrhopus > P. domesticus or Dromaeosaurus albertensis + Troodon formosus)
                    - Troodontidae (T. formosus > Velociraptor mongoliensis)
                    - Dromaeosauridae (Microraptor zhaoianus + Sinornithosaurus millenii + V. mongoliensis)
                  - Avialae (Archaeopteryx + Neornithes)

=== Ornithischia ===
(Iguanodon/Triceratops > Cetiosaurus/Tyrannosaurus)

- ? Lesothosaurus diagnosticus
- ? Heterodontosauridae
- Genasauria (Ankylosaurus + Triceratops)
  - Thyreophora (Ankylosaurus > Triceratops)
    - Scelidosauridae
    - Eurypoda (Ankylosaurus + Stegosaurus)
      - Stegosauria (Stegosaurus > Ankylosaurus)
        - Huayangosauridae (Huayangosaurus > Stegosaurus)
        - Stegosauridae (Stegosaurus > Huayangosaurus)
          - Dacentrurus armatus
          - Stegosaurinae (Stegosaurus > Dacentrurus)
      - Ankylosauria (Ankylosaurus > Stegosaurus)
        - Ankylosauridae (Ankylosaurus > Panoplosaurus)
          - Gastonia burgei
          - Shamosaurus scutatus
          - Ankylosaurinae (Ankylosaurus > Shamosaurus)
        - Nodosauridae (Panoplosaurus > Ankylosaurus)
  - Cerapoda (Triceratops > Ankylosaurus)
    - Ornithopoda (Edmontosaurus > Triceratops)
      - ? Lesothosaurus diagnosticus
      - ? Heterodontosauridae
      - Euornithopoda
        - Hypsilophodon foxii
        - Thescelosaurus neglectus
        - Iguanodontia (Edmontosaurus > Thescelosaurus)
          - Tenontosaurus tilletti
          - Rhabdodontidae
          - Dryomorpha
            - Dryosauridae
            - Ankylopollexia
              - Camptosauridae
              - Styracosterna
                - Lurdusaurus arenatus
                - Iguanodontoidea (=Hadrosauriformes)
                  - Iguanodontidae
                  - Hadrosauridae (Telmatosaurus + Parasaurolophus + Corythosaurus)
                    - Telmatosaurus transsylvanicus
                    - Euhadrosauria
                      - Lambeosaurinae
                      - Saurolophinae (=Hadrosaurinae)
    - Marginocephalia
      - Pachycephalosauria (Pachycephalosaurus wyomingensis > Triceratops horridus)
        - Goyocephala (Goyocephale + Pachycephalosaurus)
          - Homalocephaloidea (Homalocephale + Pachycephalosaurus)
            - Homalocephalidae
            - Pachycephalosauridae
      - Ceratopsia (Triceratops > Pachycephalosaurus)
        - Psittacosauridae
        - Neoceratopsia
          - Coronosauria
            - Protoceratopsidae
            - Bagaceratopidae
            - Ceratopsoidea
              - Leptoceratopsidae
              - Ceratopsomorpha
                - Ceratopsidae (Triceratops + Styracosaurus)
                  - Centrosaurinae
                  - Chasmosaurinae

== Baron / Norman / Barrett classification ==
In 2017 Matthew G. Baron and his colleagues published a new analysis proposing to put Theropoda (except Herrerasauridae) and Ornithischia within a group called Ornithoscelida (a name originally coined by Thomas Henry Huxley in 1870), redefining Saurischia to cover Sauropodomorpha and Herrerasauridae. Amongst other things this would require hypercarnivory to have evolved independently for Theropoda and Herrerasauridae. This scheme is currently debated among palaeontologists, with recent studies finding little difference between the traditional and newly proposed models.

- Dinosauria
  - Ornithoscelida
    - Ornithischia
    - Theropoda
  - Saurischia
    - Sauropodomorpha
    - Herrerasauridae

== Cau 2018 ==
In his paper about the stepwise evolution of the avian bauplan, Cau (2018) found in the parsimony analysis a polytomy between herrerasaur-grade taxa, Sauropodomorpha and the controversial Ornithoscelida. The Bayesian analysis, however, found weak support for the sister grouping of Dinosauria and Herrerasauria, but strong support for the dichotomy between Sauropodomorpha and Ornithoscelida, as shown below:

- Dracohors
  - †Silesauridae (including Pisanosaurus)
  - - †Herrerasauria
      - - †Tawa
        - †Daemonosaurus
      - - †Staurikosaurus
        - - †Herrerasaurus
          - †Sanjuansaurus
    - Dinosauria
      - †Sauropodomorpha
      - - †Eodromaeus
        - Ornithoscelida
          - †Ornithischia
          - Theropoda

== See also ==
- List of dinosaur genera
