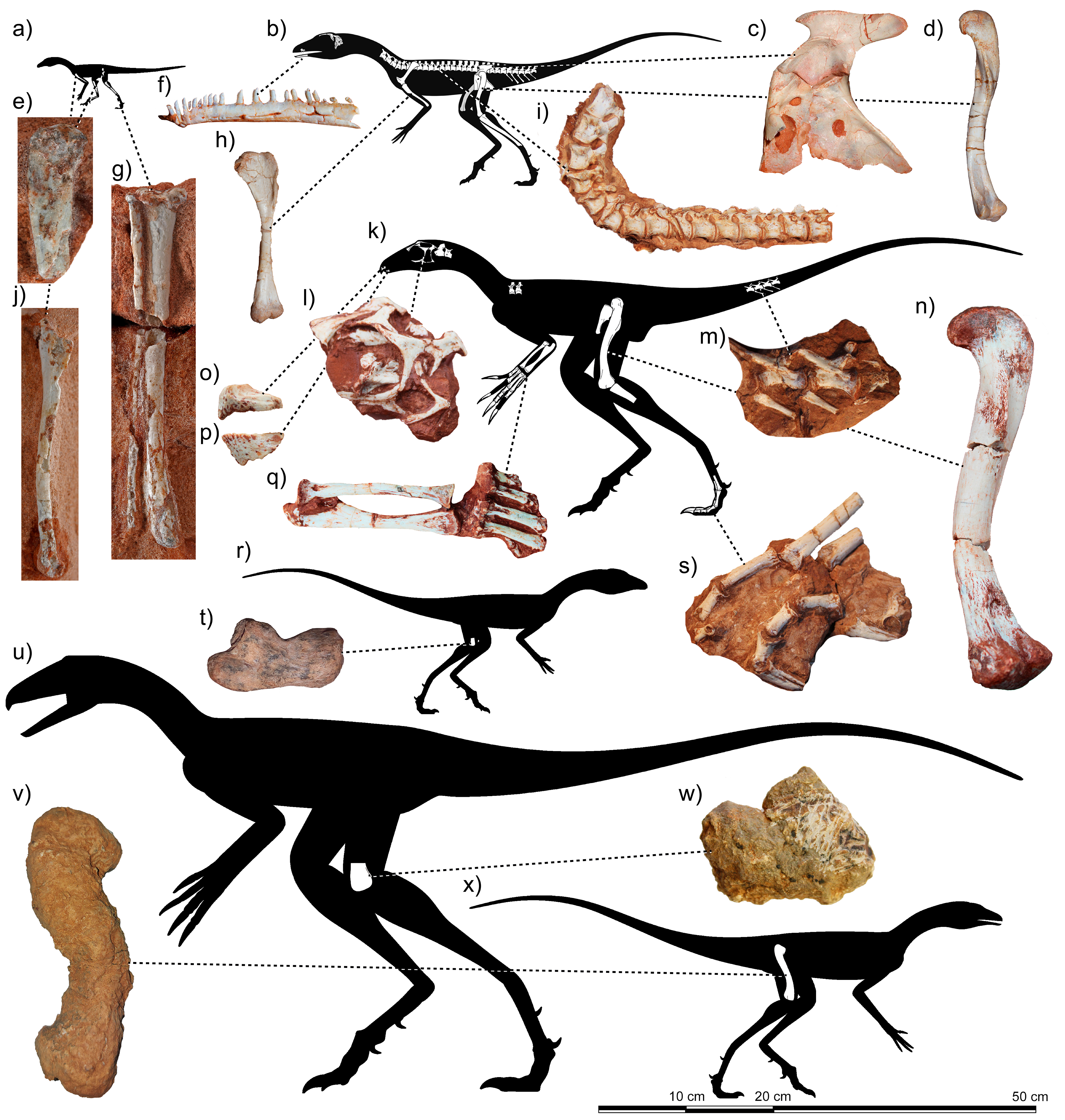
- Fossil material and skeletal reconstructions (to scale) of several Brazilian lagerpetid specimens

Scientific classification
- Kingdom: Animalia
- Phylum: Chordata
- Class: Reptilia
- Clade: Avemetatarsalia
- Clade: Ornithodira
- Clade: †Pterosauromorpha
- Family: †Lagerpetidae; Arcucci, 1986

Genera
- †Dromomeron; †Faxinalipterus?; †Ixalerpeton; †Kongonaphon; †Lagerpeton; †Scleromochlus?; †Venetoraptor

= Lagerpetidae =

Lagerpetidae Temporal range: Triassic, 242–211.9 Ma

Extinct family of reptiles

Lagerpetidae (/ˌlædʒərˈpɛtɪdiː/; originally Lagerpetonidae) is a family of basal avemetatarsalians (early-diverging members of the reptile lineage leading to birds and other dinosaurs). Though traditionally considered the earliest-diverging dinosauromorphs (archosaurs closer to dinosaurs than to pterosaurs), fossils described in 2020 suggested that lagerpetids are instead an early branch of pterosauromorphs (closer to pterosaurs than to dinosaurs). Lagerpetid fossils are known from the Triassic of San Juan (Argentina), Arizona, New Mexico, and Texas (United States), Rio Grande do Sul (Brazil), India and Madagascar. Scleromochlus, a minuscule archosaur from Scotland, is sometimes regarded as a lagerpetid or close relative of the family.

Lagerpetids were generally small and lightly-built animals; the largest include Dromomeron gigas (from Argentina) and an indeterminate Dromomeron specimen from the Santa Rosa Formation of Texas, reaching a femoral length of 15–22 cm (5.9–8.7 in), it is also possible that Alickmeron maleriensis (from India) could reach the same proportions as its upper partial femur was 6.5 cm and femoral condyle was about 4.3 cm in length. Lagerpetid fossils are rare; the most common finds are bones of the hindlimbs, which have a number of distinctive features. Remains from other parts of the body have accumulated more frequently since the late 2010s. Several species are now known to possess both small densely-packed teeth and a toothless region at the tip of the snout that may have formed a beak.

== Description ==
=== Hip and hindlimbs ===
As with most early avemetatarsalians, the most characteristic adaptations of lagerpetids occurred in their hip, leg and ankle bones, likely as a result of these being the bones most commonly preserved. Hip material is only known in Ixalerpeton, Lagerpeton, and Venetoraptor, which share three adaptations of the ilium (upper blade of the hip). The supraacetabular crest, a ridge of bone which lies above the acetabulum (hip socket), is thickest above the middle portion of the acetabulum, rather than the front of it. However, it also extends further forwards than in most dinosauromorphs, snaking along the length of the pubic peduncle (the area of the ilium which connects to the pubis). The ilium's facet for the pubis opens downwards, a trait also acquired by ornithischian dinosaurs. The hip in general was wide, had a closed acetabulum (i.e. one with a bony inner wall), and had two sacral vertebrae, lacking many specializations of later dinosauromorphs, like dinosaurs.

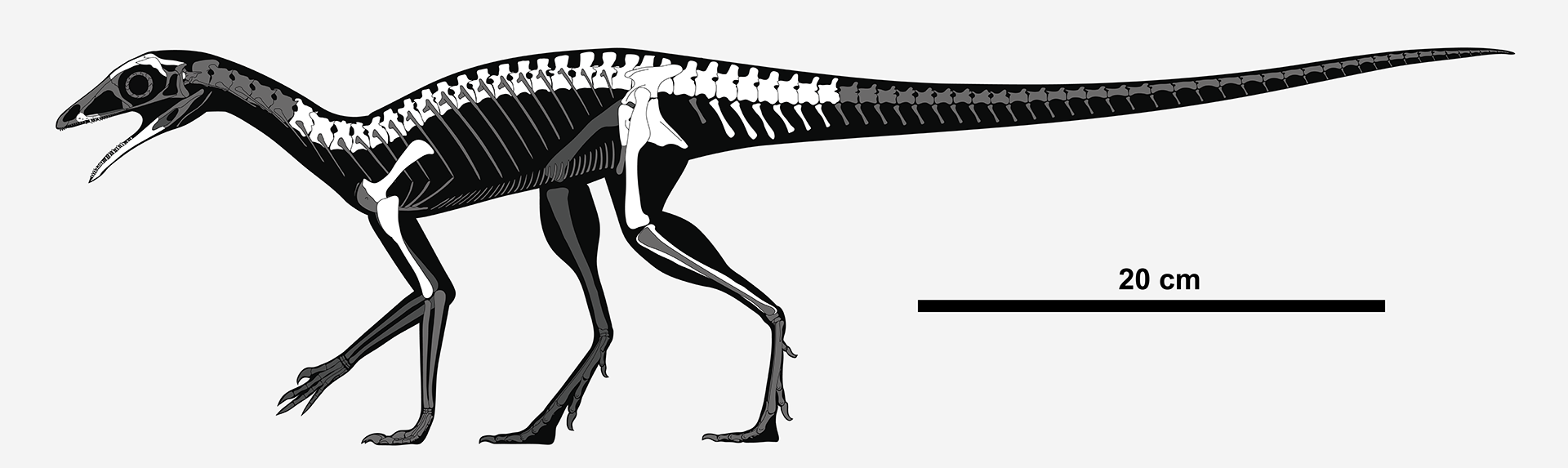
Skeletal diagram of Ixalerpeton polesinensis, restored in a quadrupedal stance. Known elements in white and unknown in gray.

Like other early archosaurs (and archosaur relatives such as Euparkeria), the femur (thigh bone) was slender and S-shaped. The femoral head was thin when seen from above, and its apex projected about 45 degrees between medially (inwards) and anteriorly (forwards). Most archosaurs had three tubera (bumps) on their flattened femoral head, one at the middle of the anterolateral (forwards/outwards) surface, another at the middle of the posteromedial (backwards/inwards) surface, and a small third one which was near the apex of the femoral head. However, lagerpetids lack the anterolateral tuber, instead having an emargination in the head just below where the tuber would normally be expected. The femoral head itself was notably hook-shaped when seen from the side. The distal portion of the femur (i.e. the portion near the knee) had a pair of condyles (knobs) on either side of the rear surface, as well as a third knob-like structure known as a crista tibiofibularis, which was present just above the lateral condyle. The crista tibiofibularis was uniquely enlarged in lagerpetids, and undergoes further evolution in Ixalerpeton and particularly Dromomeron.

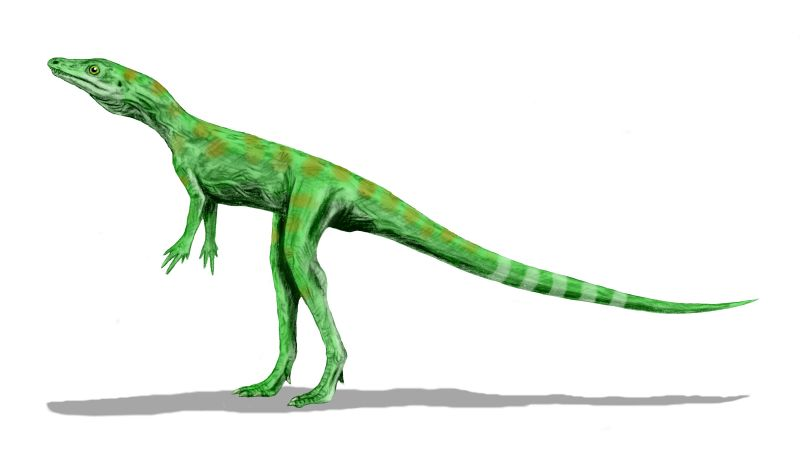
Speculative life restoration of Dromomeron romeri in a bipedal stance

The tibia and fibula (shin bones) were long and thin, with the tibia longer than the femur and generally resembling the tibia of early theropod dinosaurs. The ankle was formed by two main bones: the astragalus (which contacts both the tibia and fibula), and the calcaneum (which only contacts the fibula). As with dinosauromorphs, the astragalus was twice as wide as the reduced calcaneum. In addition, the two bones were co-ossified (fused together), akin to the condition in pterosaurs and some early dinosaurs (coelophysoids, for example). A pair of small, pyramid-shaped structures rise up out of the astragalus, one in front of the facet for the tibia, and the other behind it. The one in front is similar to a structure found in dinosauriform ankles known as the anterior ascending process, and it may be homologous with it. However, the posterior ascending process (the one behind the tibial facet) is entirely unique to lagerpetids. The rear of the astragalus lacks a horizontal groove, similar to Tropidosuchus, theropods, and ornithischians, but unlike most other archosauriforms. Like pterosaurs and dinosaurs (but unlike Marasuchus and most other archosaurs), the facet on the calcaneum which receives the fibula is concave and there is no evidence of a pronounced rearward bump known as a calcaneal tuber.

== Classification ==
The first lagerpetid known to science is Lagerpeton, an Argentinian species described by Alfred Sherwood Romer in 1971. Romer noted similarities between the hindlimbs of Lagerpeton and small theropods, though he refrained from further conclusions. From the 1980s to 2010s, lagerpetids were typically considered close relatives of the dinosaurs, as a branch of the group Dinosauromorpha. The family was originally named Lagerpetonidae by Arcucci in 1986, though it was later renamed Lagerpetidae in a phylogenetic study by S. J. Nesbitt and colleagues in 2009. A clade of lagerpetids was also recovered in the large yet controversial phylogenetic analyses of early dinosaurs and other dinosauromorphs that were produced by Baron, Norman & Barrett (2017). More recently, Müller et al. (2018) carried out a more comprehensive study on lagerpetid phylogeny, which assembled all lagerpetid specimens, taxa and morphotypes known so far into three of the most recent data matrices on early dinosauromorph/archosaur evolution. A cladogram following the analyses of Müller et al. is displayed below:

- Avemetatarsalia
  - Aphanosauria
  - Ornithodira
    - Pterosauria
    - Dinosauromorpha
      - Dinosauriformes
      - Lagerpetidae
        - Lagerpeton
        - Ixalerpeton
        - - PVSJ 883
          - - Dromomeron gregorii
            - - Dromomeron romeri
              - Dromomeron gigas

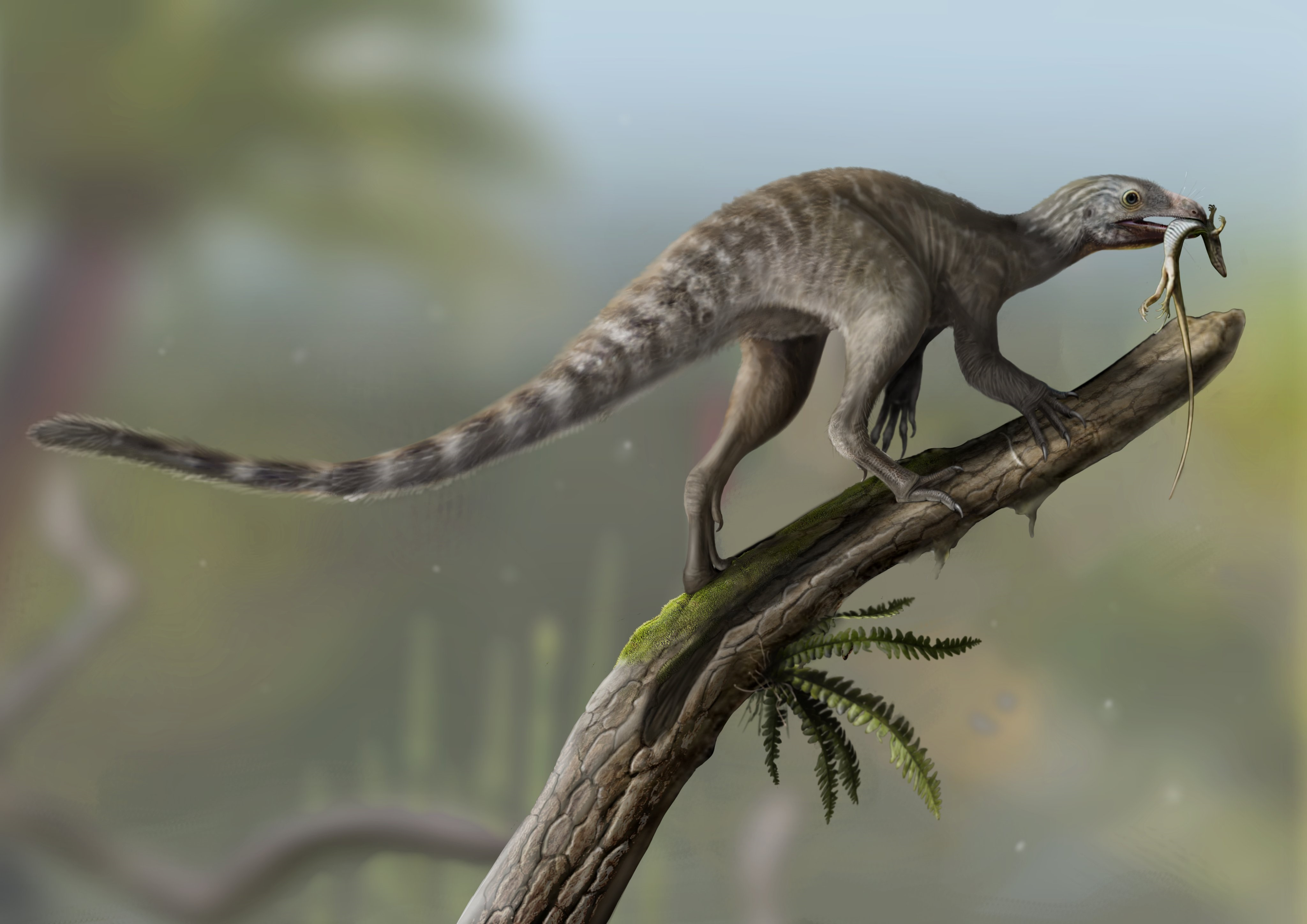
Speculative life restoration of Venetoraptor, a Brazilian lagerpetid with a hooked beak.

By contrast, Kammerer et al. (2020), Ezcurra et al. (2020), and Baron (2021) recovered Lagerpetidae as the sister clade to pterosaurs, based on newly-described fossils of the jaw, forelimbs, and braincase. In these analyses, lagerpetids were still found to form a natural, monophyletic clade as the sister taxon to the Pterosauria.

In 2025, Garcia & Müller published the preliminary findings of a revised phylogenetic dataset focused on Triassic dinosauromorphs and their relatives. In all versions of their analysis, they found that lagerpetids formed a paraphyletic grade towards Pterosauria, closing a pre-existing ghost lineage between pterosaurs and their precursor. Their analyses recovered Venetoraptor and "Dromomeron" gregorii in a clade as the closest relative of pterosaurs. Faxinalipterus, which some previous studies regard as a lagerpetid, was recovered outside of the Pterosauromorpha as it does not have some of the characters associated with this clade. These results are displayed in the cladogram below:

- Avemetatarsalia
  - Mambachiton
  - Yarasuchus
  - Spondylosoma
  - Dongusuchus
  - Teleocrater
  - - Faxinalipterus
    - Ornithodira
      - Dinosauromorpha
      - Pterosauromorpha
        - Kongonaphon
        - - Lagerpeton
          - - UFSM 11611
            - - Ixalerpeton
              - - PVSJ 883
                - - - Dromomeron gigas
                    - Dromomeron romeri
                  - - - Venetoraptor
                      - "Dromomeron" gregorii
                    - - Pterosauria
