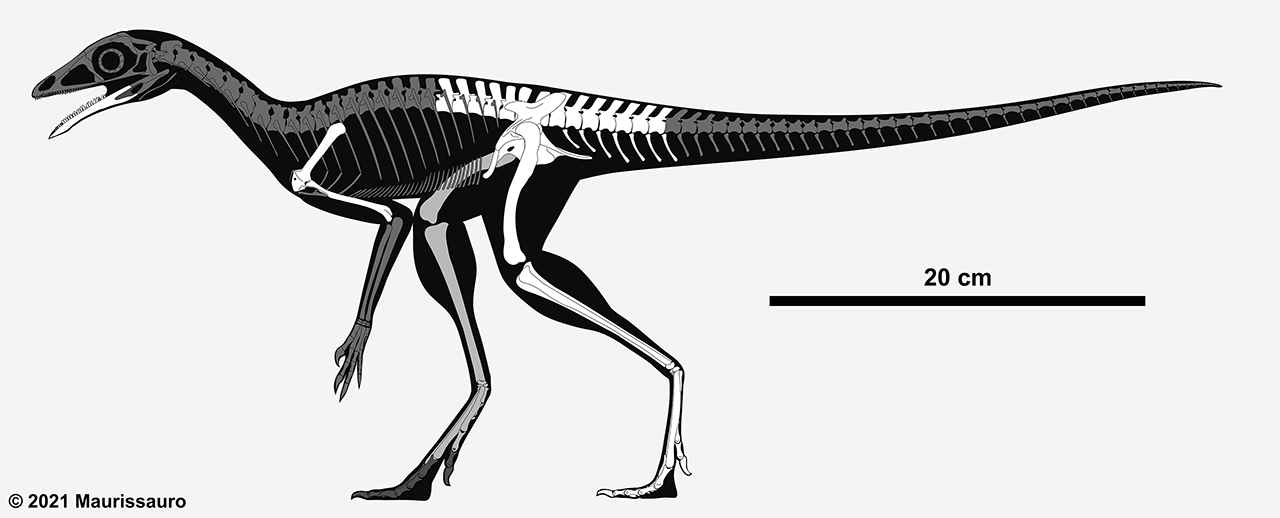
- Skeletal restoration of Lagerpeton chanarensis (known elements represented in white)
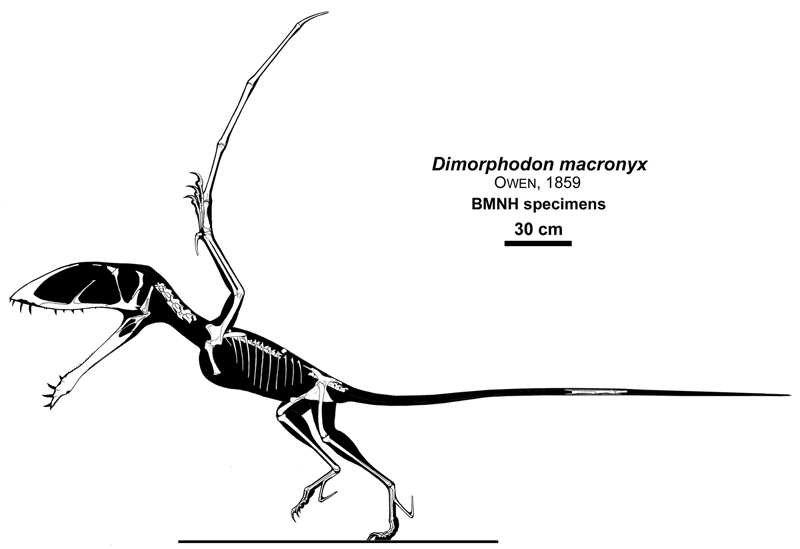
- Skeletal restoration of Dimorphodon macronyx

Scientific classification
- Kingdom: Animalia
- Phylum: Chordata
- Class: Reptilia
- Clade: Ornithodira
- Clade: †Pterosauromorpha; Kuhn-Schnyder & Rieber, 1986

Subgroups
- †Scleromochlus; †Lagerpetidae; †Pterosauria

= Pterosauromorpha =

Pterosauromorphs Temporal range: Late Triassic – Late Cretaceous, 236–66 Ma

Extinct clade of reptiles

Pterosauromorpha (meaning "pterosaur-like forms") is one of the two basic divisions of Ornithodira that includes pterosaurs and all taxa that are closer to them than to dinosaurs and their close relatives (i.e. Dinosauromorpha). In addition to pterosaurs, Pterosauromorpha also includes the basal clade Lagerpetidae and some other Late Triassic ornithodirans (such as Scleromochlus).

== Classification ==
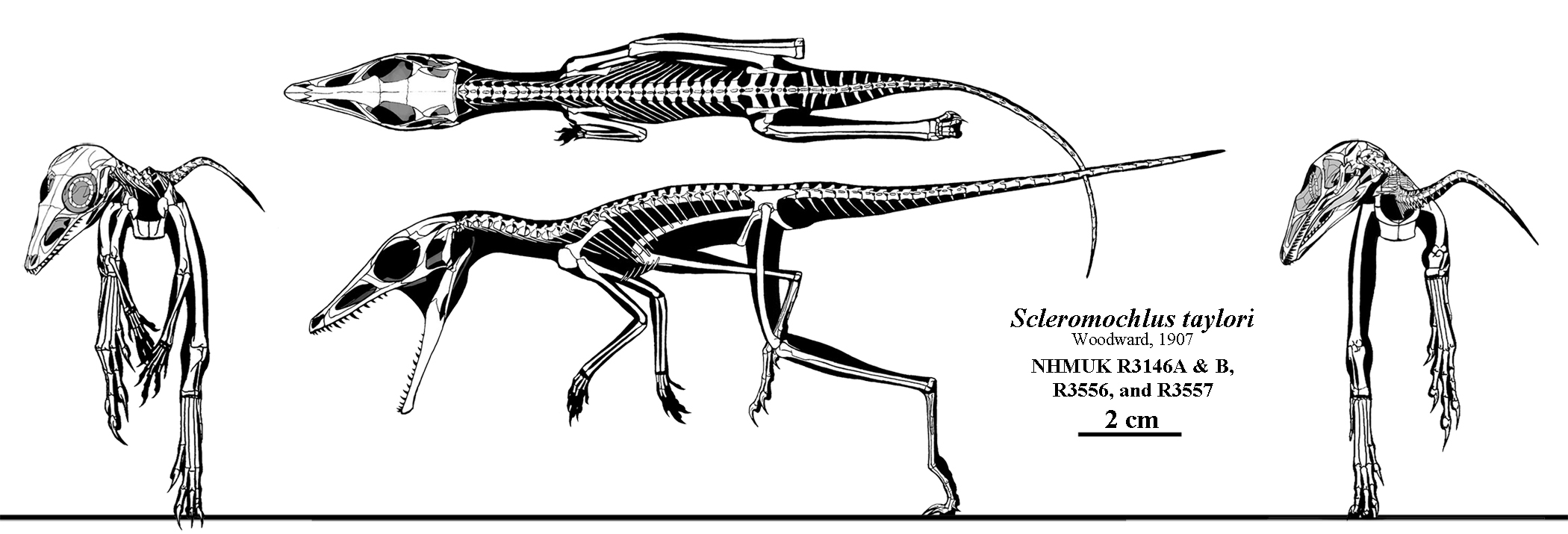
Skeletal restoration of Scleromochlus

The name Pterosauromorpha was originally coined by Emil Kuhn-Schnyder and Hans Rieber (1986) for a reptilian subclass distinct from Archosauria which includes pterosaurs. In 1997, Kevin Padian classified Pterosauromorpha as a clade of archosaurs and proposed phylogenetic definition for this group: "Pterosauria and all ornithodiran archosaurs closer to them than to dinosaurs". Brian Andres and Kevin Padian redefined Pterosauromorpha as: "The clade consisting of Pterodactylus (originally Ornithocephalus) antiquus (Sömmerring 1812) (Pterosauria) and all organisms or species that share a more recent common ancestor with it than with Alligator (originally Crocodilus) mississippiensis (Daudin 1802) (Suchia) and Compsognathus longipes Wagner 1859 (Dinosauromorpha)".

Lagerpetidae was traditionally considered the earliest diverging group of dinosauromorphs. This caused no other reptiles besides the true pterosaurs to be placed in Pterosauromorpha. The only notable exception was a small reptile named Scleromochlus, whose placement within the clade itself remained controversial due to the poor preservation of its otherwise complete remains. Different phylogenetic analyses found it as a basal pterosauromorph, a non-aphanosaurian, non-pterosaur basal avemetatarsalian, a basal dinosauromorph, or a basal archosauriform. This has resulted in a large gap between the fully aerial pterosaurs and their terrestrial ancestors, as the earliest pterosaurs were already capable flyers.

First iteration of phylogenetic analysis produced by Kammerer et al. (2020) restored lagerpetids as a basal dinosauromorphs, which corresponds to the traditional point of view. But the second iteration, in which were added Scleromochlus, found Lagerpetidae as the most basal pterosauromorphs, and Scleromochlus as the sister taxon of pterosaurs. In a study that used micro-CT scans, Ezcurra et al. (2020) have found additional similarities, including large semicircular canals within the bones of some lagerpetids that resemble that of pterosaurs. It is assumed that large semicircular canals are related to arboreal, aerial or other agile forms of terrestrial locomotion as well as rapid movements. The flocculus, the part of the brain that aids in transmitting information, was also large in both pterosaurs and lagerpetids, though to a lesser extent. When Ezcurra et al. (2020) included Scleromochlus in their analysis, they found it to be the most basal pterosauromorph, sister to a clade including lagerpetids and pterosaurs. Baron (2021) conducted his own analysis, which confirmed the relationship between lagerpetids and pterosaurs.

It has to do with the semicircular canals [in the ear], which orients you in 3D space. The shape of those canals correlates with ecology and how you move your head — basically, are you agile or not? And a lot of things that have flight have semicircular canals with a really large and characteristic [shape] because you're flying, you're in a lot more 3D space.

— Sterling Nesbitt

Kellner et al. (2022) described Maehary, a small archosaur from the Late Triassic of Brazil. Along with lagerpetids, it was interpreted as a basal pterosauromorph. It is noteworthy that left maxilla of Maehary was previously considered to be a specimen of Faxinalipterus that was re-classified as a lagerpetid. Contrary to the initial classification, phylogenetic analyses conducted by Müller et al. (2023) and Müller (2024) recovered Maehary as a gracilisuchid pseudosuchian rather than a pterosauromorph. In their study on Scleromochlus, Foffa et al. (2023) noted that the phylogenetic position of Maehary remains uncertain due to the fragmentary nature of its material.

Nesbitt et al. (2011)

- Ornithodira
  - Dinosauromorpha
    - Lagerpetidae
    - Dinosauriformes
  - Pterosauromorpha
    Pterosauria

Ezcurra et al. (2020)

- Ornithodira
  - Dinosauromorpha
  - Pterosauromorpha
    - Lagerpetidae
    - Pterosauria

Kellner et al. (2022)

- Ornithodira
  - Dinosauromorpha
  - Pterosauromorpha
    - - Maehary
      - - Lagerpetidae
        - Pterosauria

An analysis by Garcia & Müller (2025) found lagerpetids as paraphyletic to pterosaurs, and Faxinalipterus not as a pterosauromorph but as a sister taxon to Ornithodira, more closely related to ornithodirans than to Mambachiton and Aphanosauria.

- - Faxinalipterus
  - Ornithodira
    - Dinosauromorpha
    - Pterosauromorpha
      - Kongonaphon
      - - Lagerpeton
        - - UFSM 11611
          - - Ixalerpeton
            - - PVSJ 883
              - - - Dromomeron gigas
                  - Dromomeron romeri
                - - - Venetoraptor
                    - "Dromomeron" gregorii
                  - - Pterosauria
