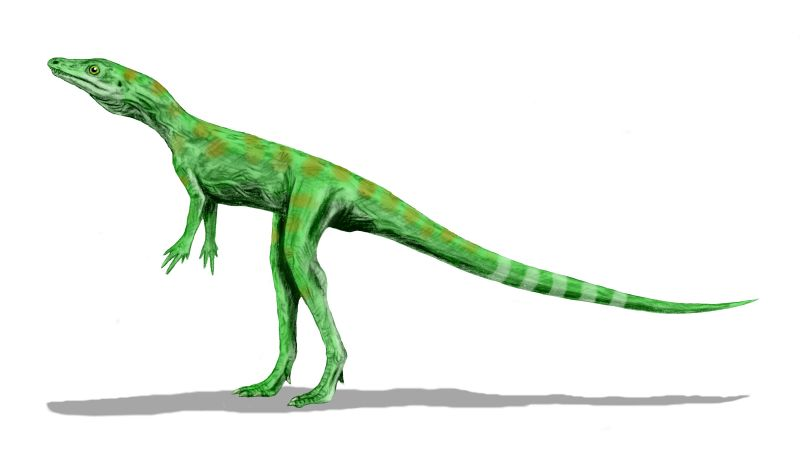
- Hypothetical reconstruction of Dromomeron romeri

Scientific classification
- Kingdom: Animalia
- Phylum: Chordata
- Class: Reptilia
- Clade: Ornithodira
- Clade: †Pterosauromorpha
- Family: †Lagerpetidae
- Genus: †Dromomeron; Irmis et al., 2007

Type species
- †Dromomeron romeri Irmis et al., 2007

Other species
- †D. gregorii Nesbitt et al., 2009; †D. gigas Martínez et al., 2016

= Dromomeron =

Dromomeron Temporal range: Late Triassic, 220–211.9 Ma

Extinct genus of reptiles

Dromomeron (meaning "running femur") is a genus of lagerpetid avemetatarsalian which lived around 220 to 211.9 ± 0.7 million years ago. The genus contains species known from Late Triassic-age rocks of the Southwestern United States and northwestern Argentina. It is described as most closely related to the earlier Lagerpeton of Argentina, but was found among remains of true dinosaurs like Chindesaurus, indicating that the first dinosaurs did not immediately replace related groups.

Based on the study of the overlapping material of Dromomeron and Tawa hallae, Christopher Bennett proposed that the two taxa were conspecific, forming a single growth series of Dromomeron. However, noting prominent differences between their femurs which cannot be attributed to variation with age, Rodrigo Muller rejected this proposal in 2017. He further noted that, while D. romeri is known from juveniles only, it shares many traits in common with D. gigas, which is known from mature specimens.

== Description ==
It is known from partial remains, largely from the hindlimbs, which indicate an animal with an overall length of 1 m (3 ft 3 in).

The brain of D. gregorii is characterised by a floccular lobe of the cerebellum that projects within the space of the semicircular canals, which are large relative to other archosauromorphs. The anterior canal is circularly shaped.

== Classification ==
The bones of Dromomeron are most similar to those of the older pterosauromorph Lagerpeton, and the two animals have been classified together in a clade Lagerpetonidae.

Cladogram simplified after Kammerer, Nesbitt & Shubin (2012):

- Ornithodira
  - Pterosauria
  - Dinosauromorpha
    - Lagerpetonidae
      - Lagerpeton chanarensis
      - - Dromomeron gregorii
        - Dromomeron romeri
    - Dinosauriformes
      - Dinosauria

== Discovery and species ==
=== Dromomeron romeri ===
The species name romeri honors influential 20th-century vertebrate paleontologist Alfred Sherwood Romer. Dromomeron and the type species D. romeri are based on Ruth Hall Museum of Paleontology GR 218, a complete left femur from the Hayden Quarry at Ghost Ranch, New Mexico. The rocks there are in the lower portion of the Petrified Forest Member of the Chinle Formation and are Norian in age. Additional hindlimb bones, some probably from the same individual, are also known, and a partial skeleton has been recovered from Hayden Quarry but has not yet been fully prepared. The known specimens of D. romeri have been interpreted as representing juvenile individuals, which limits knowledge of the species' adult morphology and size. A few other specimens have been recovered from nearby localities, including the Snyder Quarry. Other specimens from the Chinle Formation of Arizona and a roughly contemporaneous part of the Dockum Group of Texas also have been assigned to this genus. These have been assigned to a second species, D. gregorii, named in 2009.

=== Dromomeron gregorii ===
D. gregorii, named for Joseph T. Gregory, is based on TMM 31100–1306, a right femur (thigh bone) from the Otis Chalk Quarry, Colorado City Formation, (Dockum Group), near Otis Chalk, Texas. Several other limb bones from the quarry, and a partial femur (thigh bone) from the Placerias Quarry of eastern Arizona have been assigned to this species. The rocks that D. gregorii is known from are older than those D. romeri has been found in. As with the Hayden Quarry, the Otis Chalk Quarry has at least one specimen of a herrerasaurid.

=== Dromomeron gigas ===
A third species, D. gigas, was described by Martínez et al. (2016) on the basis of fossils recovered from the Norian Quebrada del Barro Formation in northwestern Argentina.

== Paleoecology ==
Also found at the Hayden Quarry are the remains of phytosaurs, aetosaurs, rauisuchians, and several types of dinosaurs and dinosaur relatives, including a Silesaurus-like animal, the herrerasaurid Chindesaurus, and the basal theropod Tawa. Finding the remains of four types of dinosaurs and dinosaur relatives (including Dromomeron itself) is noteworthy because it shows that dinosaurs did not immediately replace their dinosauromorph predecessors; that some of these groups, like the lagerpetonids, persisted (for longer than previously known) and diversified; and that dinosaurian replacement may have occurred at different times in different areas.
