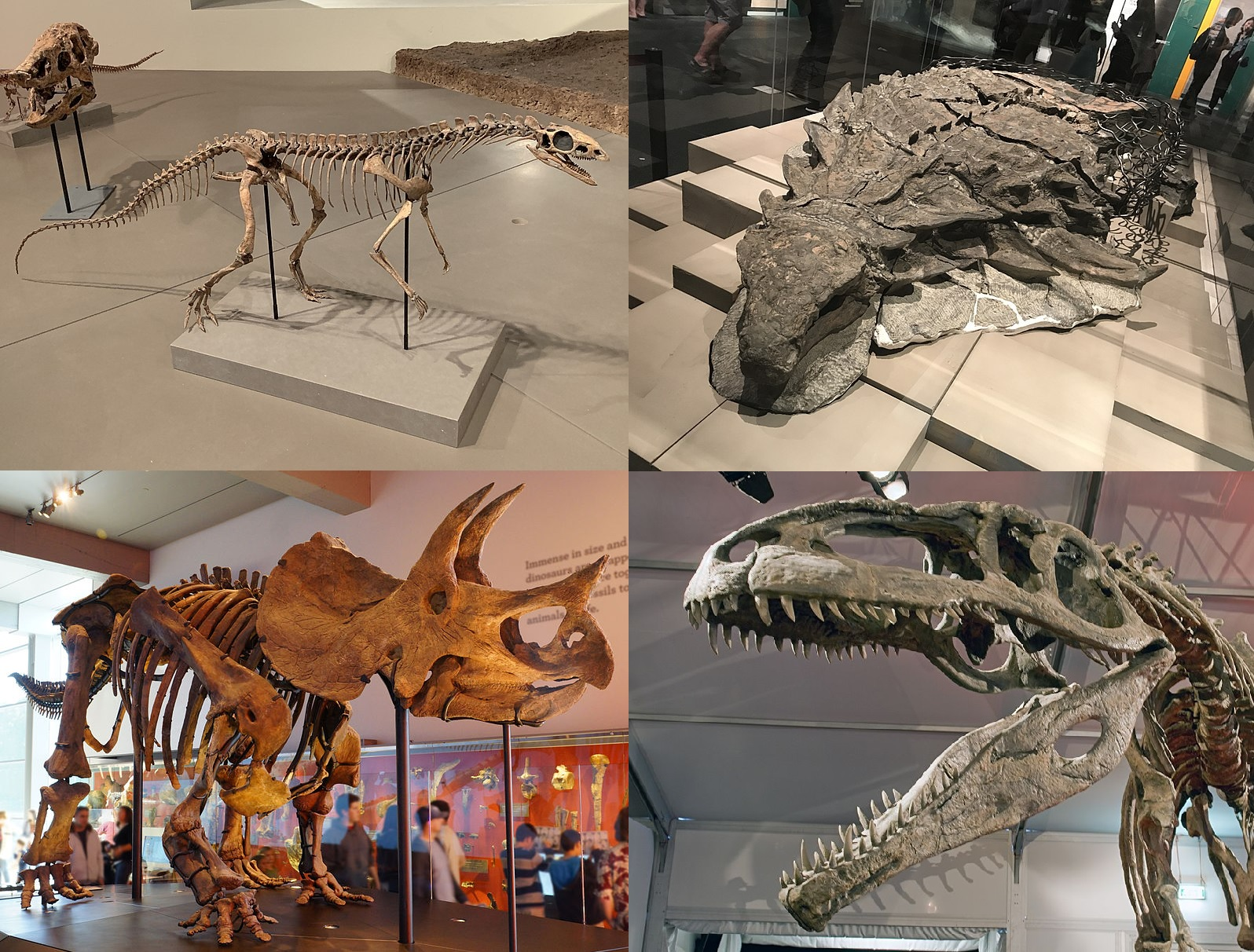
- From top to bottom and left to right, different type of dinosauromorphs: Asilisaurus, Borealopelta, Triceratops and Giganotosaurus.

Scientific classification
- Kingdom: Animalia
- Phylum: Chordata
- Class: Reptilia
- Clade: Ornithodira
- Clade: Dinosauromorpha; Benton, 1985

Subgroups
- †Lagosuchus
- †Marasuchus
- †Saltopus
- Dinosauria (includes birds)
Dinosauromorpha incertae sedis
- †Agnosphitys
- †Nyasasaurus
- †Herrerasauria
- †Silesauridae (possibly paraphyletic)

= Dinosauromorpha =

Dinosauromorphs Temporal range: Middle Triassic – Present, 247–0 Ma (possible Early Triassic record)

Clade of reptiles

Dinosauromorpha is a clade of avemetatarsalians (archosaurs closer to birds than to crocodilians) that includes the Dinosauria (dinosaurs) and some of their close relatives in the Triassic Period. Dinosauromorpha was originally defined to include dinosauriforms and lagerpetids (a family of small long-legged Triassic reptiles). A later definition specifically excluded pterosaurs from Dinosauromorpha, with the flying reptiles instead occupying its sister group Pterosauromorpha.

Dinosauriformes is a similar grouping encompassing dinosaurs and Lagosuchus (or Marasuchus), an even closer relative than lagerpetids. Additional fossils indicate that lagerpetids are probably pterosauromorphs rather than dinosauromorphs. Without lagerpetids, there is little practical difference between Dinosauromorpha and Dinosauriformes.

Dinosaurs are the only dinosauromorphs to survive past the Triassic, and birds (as living dinosaurs) are the only dinosauromorphs which survive to the present day.

== Classification ==
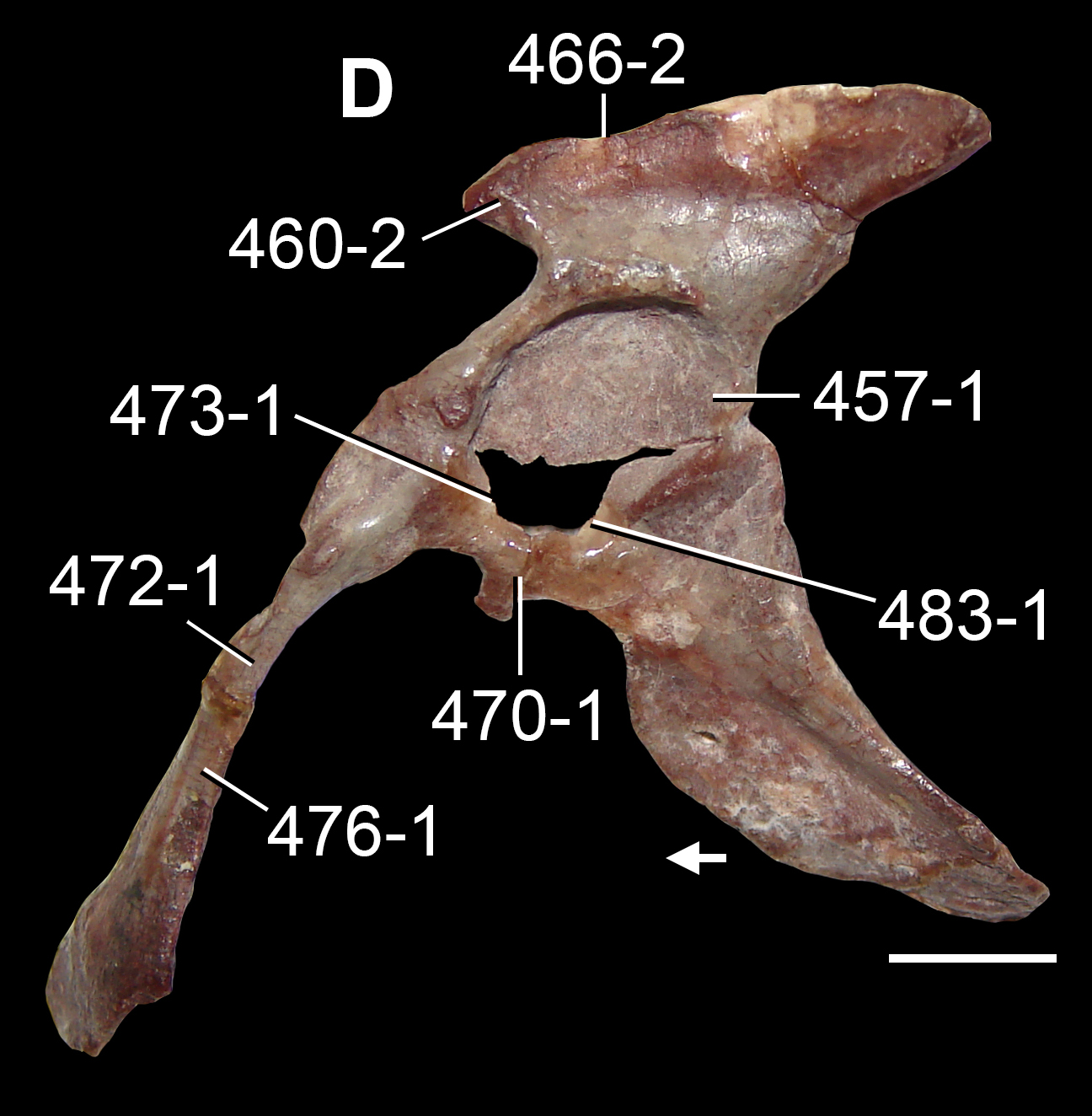
Pelvis of Marasuchus (=Lagosuchus?) specimen PVL 3870

The name "Dinosauromorpha" was briefly coined by Michael J. Benton in 1985. It was considered an alternative name for the group "Ornithosuchia", which was named by Jacques Gauthier to correspond to archosaurs closer to dinosaurs than to crocodilians. Although "Ornithosuchia" was later recognized as a misnomer (since ornithosuchids are now considered closer to crocodilians than to dinosaurs), it was still a more popular term than Dinosauromorpha in the 1980s. The group encompassed by Gauthier's "Ornithosuchia" and Benton's "Dinosauromorpha" is now given the name Avemetatarsalia.

In 1991, Paul Sereno redefined Dinosauromorpha as a node-based clade, defined by a last common ancestor and its descendants. In his definition, Dinosauromorpha included the last common ancestor of Lagerpeton (a lagerpetid), Marasuchus (a possible junior synonym of Lagosuchus), Pseudolagosuchus (now considered a synonym of the silesaurid Lewisuchus), Dinosauria (including Aves), and all its descendants. This definition was intended to correspond to a clade including lagerpetids and crownward bird-line archosaurs, but not pterosaurs or other archosaurs.

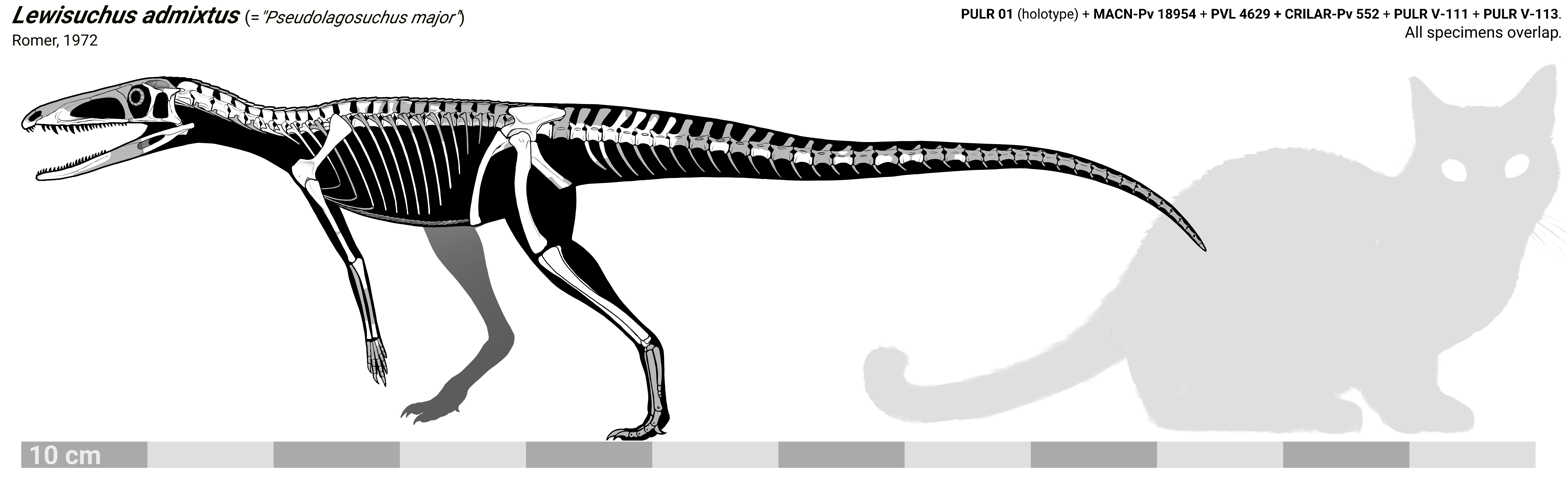
Skeletal reconstruction of Lewisuchus admixtus (="Pseudolagosuchus major"), an early silesaurid

In 2011, Dinosauromorpha was redefined by Sterling Nesbitt to be a branch-based clade, defined by including reptiles closer to one group than to another. Under this definition, Dinosauromorpha included all reptiles closer to dinosaurs (represented by Passer domesticus, the house sparrow), rather than pterosaurs (represented by Pterodactylus), ornithosuchids (represented by Ornithosuchus), or other pseudosuchians (represented by Crocodylus niloticus, the Nile crocodile). Nesbitt's study supported the hypothesis that Pterosauromorpha (pterosaurs and their potential relatives) was the sister group of Dinosauromorpha. Pterosauromorphs and dinosauromorphs together formed the group Ornithodira, which encompasses almost all avemetatarsalians.

Dinosauriformes was coined in 1992 by F.E. Novas, who used it to encompass dinosaurs, Lagosuchus, "Pseudolagosuchus" (=Lewisuchus), and the herrerasaurids, which he did not consider to be "eudinosaurs" (true dinosaurs like ornithischians and saurischians). Contrary to Novas, most paleontologists since 1992 have considered herrerasaurids to be true dinosaurs, though many other dinosaur-like reptiles still fall within his definition of Dinosauriformes. Novas (1992) defined Dinosauriformes as a node-based clade containing the most recent common ancestor of Lagosuchus and Dinosauria, and all its descendants. Nesbitt (2011) provided a roughly equivalent definition, using Marasuchus and Passer domesticus (the house sparrow, a representative of dinosaurs). In his analysis, Dinosauriformes included dinosaurs, silesaurids, and Marasuchus, but not lagerpetids, which were considered to be an earlier-branching family of dinosauromorphs.

=== Phylogeny ===
A phylogenetic analysis by Andrea Cau in 2018 resolved two different topologies for dinosaur origins, depending on whether it was run using parsimony or bayesian inference. Cau coined the term Dracohors for the clade uniting all taxa closer to the theropod Megalosaurus bucklandi than the basal form Marasuchus lilloensis. The name is derived from the Latin words for "dragon" and "cohort", draco and cohors. Under parsimony results, Dracohors included only Silesauridae and Dinosauria, the latter including the groups Herrerasauria, Sauropodomorpha, Theropoda and Ornithischia, along with the basal form Eodromaeus. However, under bayesian results, Herrerasauria placed outside Dinosauria within Dracohors, and Dinosauriformes, Dinosauromorpha, and Pan-Aves were synonyms, with Marasuchus in a clade with lagerpetids. Pisanosaurus was resolved within Silesauridae. Cau identified the synapomorphies of Dracohors as:

The anterior tympanic recess, the axial epipophyses, the centrodiapophyseal laminae in the presacral vertebrae, the relative size enlargement of the postacetabular process of ilium, the elongation of the pubis, the proximal sulcus and the reduction of the ligament tuber in the femoral head, and the further reduction in length of the fourth metatarsal and toe compared to the third.

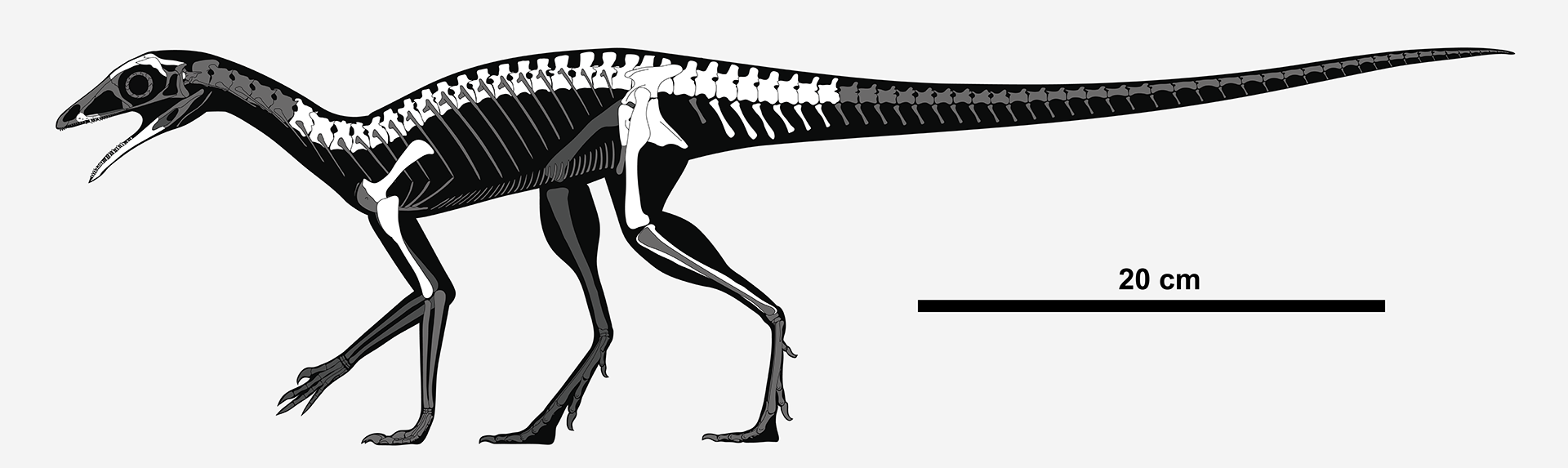
Skeletal diagram of Ixalerpeton, a lagerpetid

Following the discovery and description of more cranial and postcranial material of the genera Kongonaphon, Ixalerpeton and Lagerpeton, it was found that lagerpetids shared many features with the basal taxa of Pterosauria. Features of the maxillary bone, teeth, braincase and forelimb meant that the 2020 phylogenetic analysis of Ezcurra and colleagues placed Lagerpetidae next to pterosaurs within Pterosauromorpha, removing the family from Dinosauromorpha. The contents of Dinosauromorpha was thus restricted to only Silesauridae, Dinosauria, and individual genera like Lagosuchus.

Simultaneously, Rodrigo Müller and Maurício Garcia published novel results that reduced the family Silesauridae to a grade of basal dinosaurs in Ornithischia. Pisanosaurus, considered by various authors to be either a silesaurid or basal ornithischian, was found to be intermediate between the grade of silesaurids and true ornithischians, explaining its peculiar combination of silesaurid and ornithischian features that has resulted in its phylogenetic inconsistency. Lewisuchus, a carnivorous form, was found to be the most primitive form of ornithischian, which was almost universally considered to be an only-herbivorous clade before. The reclassification of silesaurids left Lagerpetidae and Lagosuchus as the only non-Dinosaurians in the Dinosauromorpha . Below are the results of:

Cau (2018, parsimony results):

- Dinosauromorpha
  - Lagerpetidae
  - Dinosauriformes
    - Marasuchus
    - Dracohors
      - Silesauridae
      - Dinosauria

Cau (2018, bayesian results):

- Dinosauromorpha
  - - Marasuchus
    - Lagerpetidae
  - Dracohors
    - Teleocrater
    - - Silesauridae
      - - Herrerasauria
        - Dinosauria

Ezcurra et al. (2020):

- Ornithodira
  - Pterosauromorpha
    - Lagerpetidae
    - Pterosauria
  - Dinosauromorpha
    - Lagosuchus
    - Dracohors
      - Silesauridae
      - Dinosauria

Müller and Garcia (2020):

- Dinosauromorpha
  - Lagerpetidae
  - Dinosauriformes
    - Lagosuchus
    - Dinosauria
      - Saurischia
      - Ornithischia
        (incl. silesaurids)

A variety of individual species and taxa have at times been found to place within Dinosauromorpha and its subgroups, but outside Dinosauria. The taxon Marasuchus has been consistently recovered as a dinosauromorph between lagerpetids and silesaurids, but may also be a junior synonym of the coexisting form Lagosuchus, another dinosauromorph. Pisanosaurus, traditionally considered an ornithischian, was recovered in an unpublished analysis as a dinosauriform outside other clades, but has since been recovered only as a member of Silesauridae or Ornithischia. Saltopus, an enigmatic taxon from the Late Triassic of Scotland, has been placed closer to dinosaurs than Marasuchus, in a polytomy with Silesauridae and Dinosauria, as a sister taxon to Marasuchus, or within Dinosauria as a basal saurischian. The British taxon Agnosphitys was originally described as a dinosauriform closer to Dinosauria than Herrerasaurus, but has also been classified as a dinosauriform more derived than silesaurids but basal to Herrerasauridae and Dinosauria, a silesaurid, or a basal saurischian. The genus Nyasasaurus from the early Late Triassic of Tanzania is known only from vertebra and a single humerus, making it difficult to classify. It has been variously found as the direct sister taxon of Dinosauria, the basalmost ornithischian, a basal theropod, or a deeply-nested sauropodomorph.

== Origins ==
Dinosauromorphs appeared putatively around 242 to 244 million years ago by the Anisian stage of the Middle Triassic, splitting from other ornithodires. Early Triassic footprints reported in October 2010 from the Świętokrzyskie (Holy Cross) Mountains of Poland may belong to a dinosauromorph. If so, the origin of dinosauromorphs would be pushed back into the Early Olenekian, around 249 Ma. The oldest Polish footprints are from a small quadrupedal animal named Prorotodactylus, but footprints belonging to the ichnogenus Sphingopus that have been found from Early Anisian strata show that moderately large bipedal dinosauromorphs had appeared by 246 Ma. The tracks show that the dinosaur lineage appeared soon after the Permian-Triassic extinction event. Their age suggests that the rise of dinosaurs was slow and drawn out across much of the Triassic. However, other researchers have questioned the dinosauromorph affinities of Prorotodactylus and suggested that the tracemaker may have been a basal archosauriform such as the Euparkeriidae.

The Manda Beds of Tanzania are sometimes considered to host the oldest definitive dinosauromorph fossils. Asilisaurus is a silesaurid from this formation, as is the possible dinosaur Nyasasaurus, pushing the origins of the groups back further. Though often assumed to be from the Anisian, many studies now regard the formation as late Ladinian or early Carnian. This would put it roughly in line with other formations with early dinosauromorphs, such as the Chañares Formation of Argentina and the lower Santa Maria Formation of Brazil.

Putative basal dinosauromorphs include Saltopus, Marasuchus, the perhaps identical Lagosuchus, the lagerpetid Lagerpeton from the early Carnian of Argentina and Dromomeron from the Norian of Arizona, New Mexico, and Texas (all in the United States), Ixalerpeton polesinensis, and an unnamed form from the Carnian (Santa Maria Formation) of Brazil, and the silesaurids, which include (among others): Silesaurus from the Carnian of Poland, Eucoelophysis from the Carnian-Norian of New Mexico, Lewisuchus and the perhaps identical Pseudolagosuchus from the Ladinian of Argentina, Sacisaurus from the Norian of Brazil, Technosaurus from the Carnian of Texas, Asilisaurus from the Middle Triassic or Carnian of Tanzania, and Diodorus from the Carnian(?) to Norian of Morocco.
