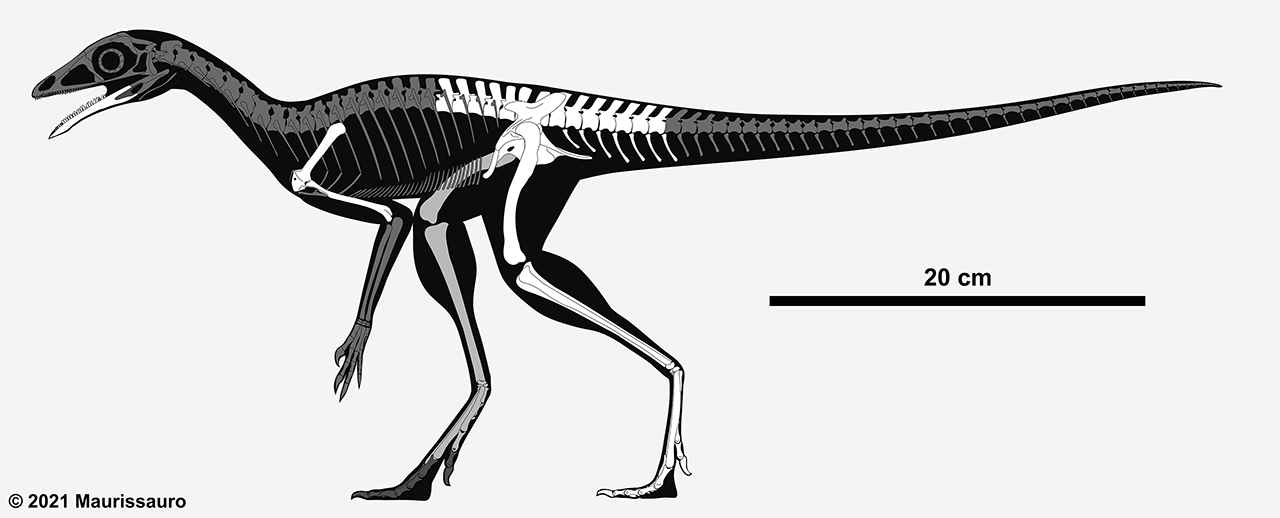
- Skeletal diagram, showing preserved material in white. Unknown material (in dark gray) is reconstructed after other lagerpetids, such as Ixalerpeton and Dromomeron.

Scientific classification
- Kingdom: Animalia
- Phylum: Chordata
- Class: Reptilia
- Family: †Lagerpetidae
- Genus: †Lagerpeton; Romer, 1971

Type species
- †Lagerpeton chanarensis Romer, 1971

= Lagerpeton =

Lagerpeton Temporal range: Late Triassic ~236–234 Ma

Extinct genus of reptiles

Lagerpeton is a genus of lagerpetid avemetatarsalian, comprising a single species, L. chanarensis. First described from the Chañares Formation of Argentina by A. S. Romer in 1971, Lagerpeton's anatomy is somewhat incompletely known, with fossil specimens accounting for the pelvic girdle, hindlimbs, posterior presacral, sacral and anterior caudal vertebrae. Skull and shoulder material has also been described.

The name comes from the Greek λαγώς (lagṓs, "hare") plus ἑρπετόν (herpetón, "reptile").

== Discovery ==
Lagerpeton fossils have only been collected from the Chañares Formation in La Rioja Province, Argentina. The first of these fossils were discovered in a 1964-1965 expedition by the Museum of Comparative Zoology (MCZ) and Museo de la Plata (MLP), although some were also discovered in 1966 by paleontologists from the Miguel Lillo Institute (PVL) of the University of Tucuman.

Alfred Romer named Lagerpeton chanarensis in 1971, based on a complete right hindlimb discovered during the MCZ-MLP expedition. The specimen was initially stored at the Museo de la Plata with catalogue number MLP 64-XI-14-10, but by 1986 it had been transferred to the Paleontology Museum at the National University of La Rioja (PULR) and given the designation PULR 06, though some studies alternatively call it UPLR 06 or UNLR 06. Some of the foot bones from this specimen have gone missing. Romer also mentioned PVL material collected by Jose Bonaparte.

In 1972, Romer described MCZ 4121, which was a specimen smaller than the holotype. It was preserved in a nodule alongside the holotype of Lewisuchus admixtus and a few Lagosuchus bones. MCZ 4121 represents a few vertebrae, a pair of scapulocoracoids (mislabeled as belonging to Lagosuchus) and portions of the hip and hindlimbs, including two complete femurs. He also suggested that Lagerpeton was the probable identity of several incomplete tibiae and fibulae preserved along with several gomphodont skeletons in slab MCZ 3691. However, later authors have doubted the referral of most MCZ material to Lagerpeton, with only the MCZ 4121 femurs being confidently referred to the genus.

Andrea Arcucci described two PVL specimens, PVL 4619 and 4625, in 1986. PVL 4619, the PVL specimen mentioned by Romer, was a partial skeleton including a complete pelvis and left hindlimb, as well as a partial right hindlimb. PVL 4625 was another skeleton discovered later and originally described as including portions of the left hip, left hindlimb, and vertebral column. Paul Sereno and Arcucci redescribed the known material in 1994 and mentioned that an isolated partial femur of this species was also present at the PVL, although Martin Ezcurra (2016) noted that the provided catalogue number, PVL 5000, actually referred to a notoungulate mammal. Further preparation of PVL 4625 has revealed the presence of a scapula, dentary, and cranial fragments.

== Description ==
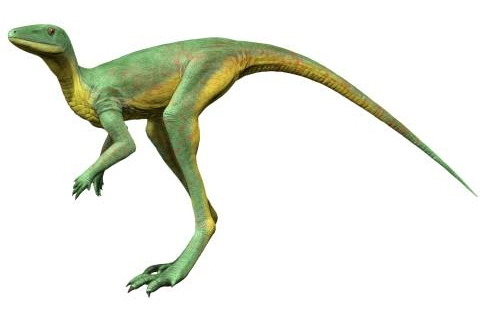
Life restoration

Lagerpeton is estimated to have been 70 cm (28 in) in length based on the length of the hindlimb; the most complete hindlimb specimen, from PVL 4619, measures 257.9mm from proximal femur to distal ungual. Body mass has been estimated as no more than 4 kilograms (8.8 lb), based on the slender cross section of limb bones and estimates between more derived dinosauromorphs, such as Silesaurus, and basal saurischians like Eoraptor. Twenty one autapomorphic characters have been identified in L. chanarensis, these include: the anterior inclination of the posterior dorsal neural spines, the hook-shaped femoral head and the length of digit IV and metatarsal IV being greater than digit III and metatarsal III. L. chanarensis lacks many dinosaurian characters, such as the anterior trochanter, placing it basal within Dinosauromorpha or even outside the group altogether.

== Classification ==
Early to late Olenekian trackways from Poland have yielded footprints of a Lagerpeton-like quadrupedal dinosauromorph. This ichnogenus, named Prorotodactylus shares multiple synapomorphic characters with Lagerpeton including approximately parallel digits II, III and IV, fused metatarsus, digitigrade posture and reduced digits I and V. Prorotodactylus also shares the, previously autapomorphic, Pes (anatomy) morphology of Lagerpeton. If this ichnogenus represents a close relative of Lagerpeton, it would push back the origin of this taxon to the Early Triassic; as a quadrupedal basal dinosauromorph, it also raises questions debating the theory that bipedalism is ancestral to dinosaurs.

Lagerpeton is the namesake of the family Lagerpetidae, a group of small avemetatarsalians which coexisted alongside dinosaurs for much of the Late Triassic. Lagerpetids are traditionally considered the most basal clade within Dinosauromorpha and the sister taxon to Dinosauriformes.

Cladogram simplified after Kammerer, Nesbitt & Shubin (2012):

- Ornithodira
  - Pterosauria
  - Dinosauromorpha
    - Lagerpetonidae
      - Lagerpeton chanarensis
      - - Dromomeron gregorii
        - Dromomeron romeri
    - Dinosauriformes
      - Dinosauria

More recently described fossil material for the group instead suggests that lagerpetids are early pterosauromorphs, more closely related to pterosaurs than to dinosaurs.

== Palaeogeography ==
The oldest fossils of L. chanarensis were found in the Chañares Formation and originate from the Upper Middle Triassic (Ladinian) of Gondwana, southern Pangaea. All Lagerpeton specimens share this geographic location, including other fossils from the Lower Late Triassic (Carnian). Radiometric dating of volcanic material in the formation has narrowed the formation and entire fossil assemblage found there to between 236 and 234 million years old.

== Locomotion ==
It has been suggested that the extant analogues most similar to L. chanarensis are small bipedal mammals, which are often saltators. Three morphological characteristics in L. chanarensis fossils have been putatively cited as evidence of saltation in this taxon: inclined neural spines, a small pelvic girdle, and didactyly.

=== Neural spines ===
The neural spines of the posterior dorsal vertebrae are inclined anteriorly, a character not observed in any other archosaur, but common in saltatory mammals. This feature is suggested to allow for greater vertebral flexibility, correlated with leaping and bounding locomotor styles.

=== Pelvic girdle ===
Relative to the hindlimb length, the pelvic girdle is remarkably small. The distance from the pelvic girdle to the femur is therefore also small, more so than most other archosaurs apart from closely related taxa. This reduction in distance may increase the force production during hip extension in extant small mammals.

=== Didactyl foot ===
The narrow and functionally didactyl pes are a further similarity to modern saltators. By condensing into a single unit, the metatarsus gains strength without the drawback of increased weight. It also appears likely that, consequently to the reduction of digit II, digit IV may have elongated to balance the pes.

The hypothesis of saltatorial locomotion is debated, however. Vertebral adaptations of extant organisms exceed those seen in Lagerpeton; the sacral vertebrae of modern saltators are fused and the neural spines reduced. Furthermore, the size of the pelvic girdle and lateral digital reduction may be equally used as evidence for cursorial locomotion.
