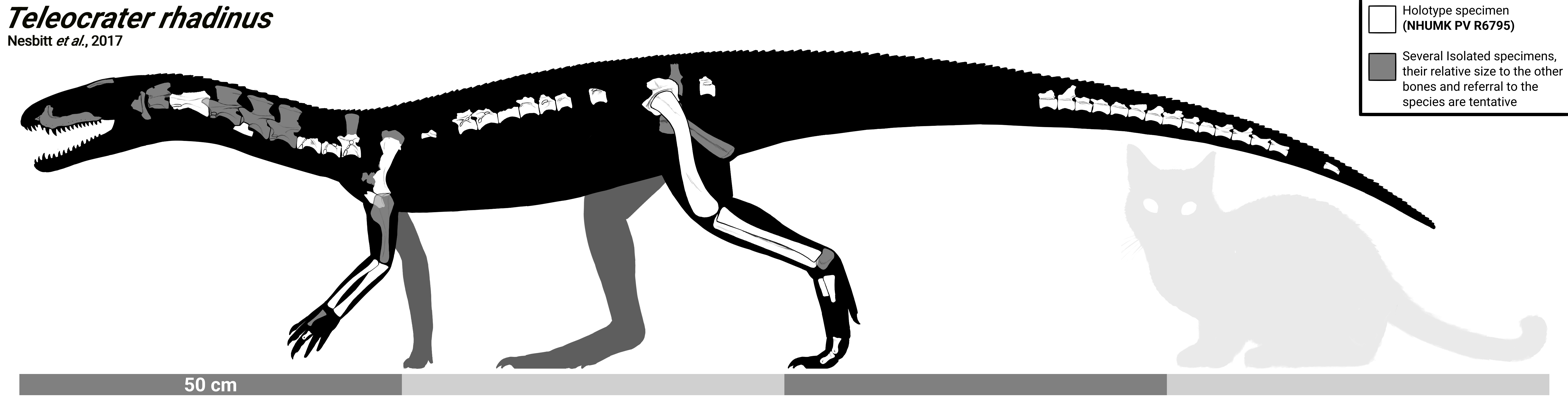
- Skeletal reconstruction of the holotype and referred specimens
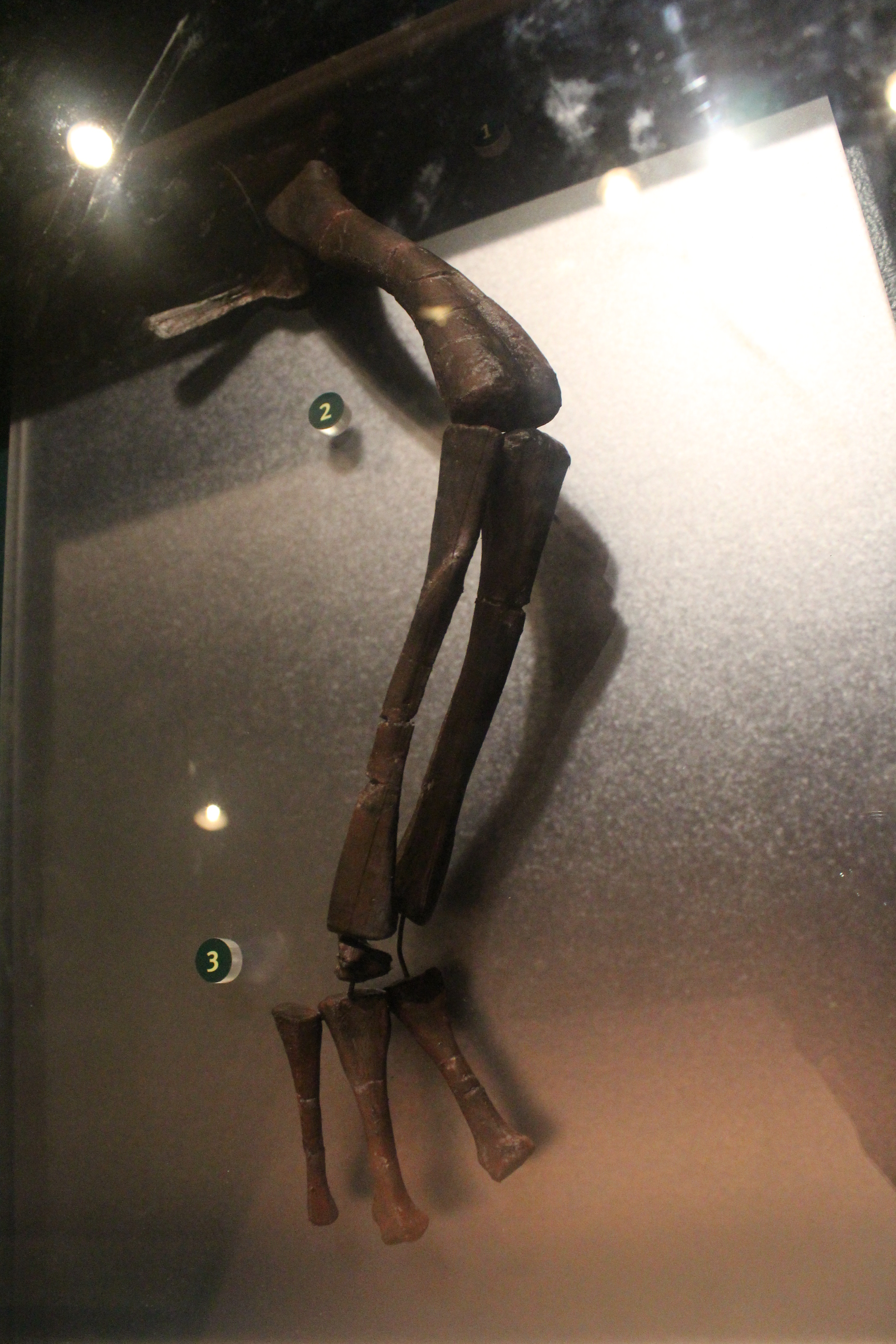
- Replica of hindlimb at the Field Museum of Natural History

Scientific classification
- Kingdom: Animalia
- Phylum: Chordata
- Class: Reptilia
- Clade: Avemetatarsalia
- Clade: †Aphanosauria
- Genus: †Teleocrater; Nesbitt et al., 2017

Type species
- †Teleocrater rhadinus Nesbitt et al., 2017

= Teleocrater =

Teleocrater Temporal range: Anisian ~247–242 Ma

Extinct genus of reptiles

Teleocrater (meaning "completed basin", in reference to its closed acetabulum) is a genus of avemetatarsalian archosaur from the Middle Triassic Manda Formation of Tanzania. The name was coined by English paleontologist Alan Charig in his 1956 doctoral dissertation, but was only formally published in 2017 by Sterling Nesbitt and colleagues. The genus contains the type and only species T. rhadinus. Uncertainty over the affinities of Teleocrater have persisted since Charig's initial publication; they were not resolved until Nesbitt et al. performed a phylogenetic analysis. They found that Teleocrater is most closely related to the similarly enigmatic Yarasuchus, Dongusuchus, and Spondylosoma in a group that was named the Aphanosauria. Aphanosauria was found to be the sister group of the Ornithodira, the group containing dinosaurs and pterosaurs.

A carnivorous quadruped measuring 7–10 feet (2.1–3.0 m) long, Teleocrater is notable for its unusually long neck vertebrae. The neural canals in its neck vertebrae gradually become taller towards the back of the neck, which may be a distinguishing trait. Unlike the Lagerpetidae or Ornithodira, the hindlimbs of Teleocrater are not adapted for running; the metatarsal bones are not particularly elongated. Also unlike lagerpetids and ornithodirans, Teleocrater inherited the more flexible ankle configuration present ancestrally among archosaurs, suggesting that the same configuration was also ancestral to Avemetatarsalia but was lost independently by several lineages. Histology of the long bones of Teleocrater indicates that it had moderately fast growth rates, closer to ornithodirans than crocodilians and other pseudosuchians.

== Description ==
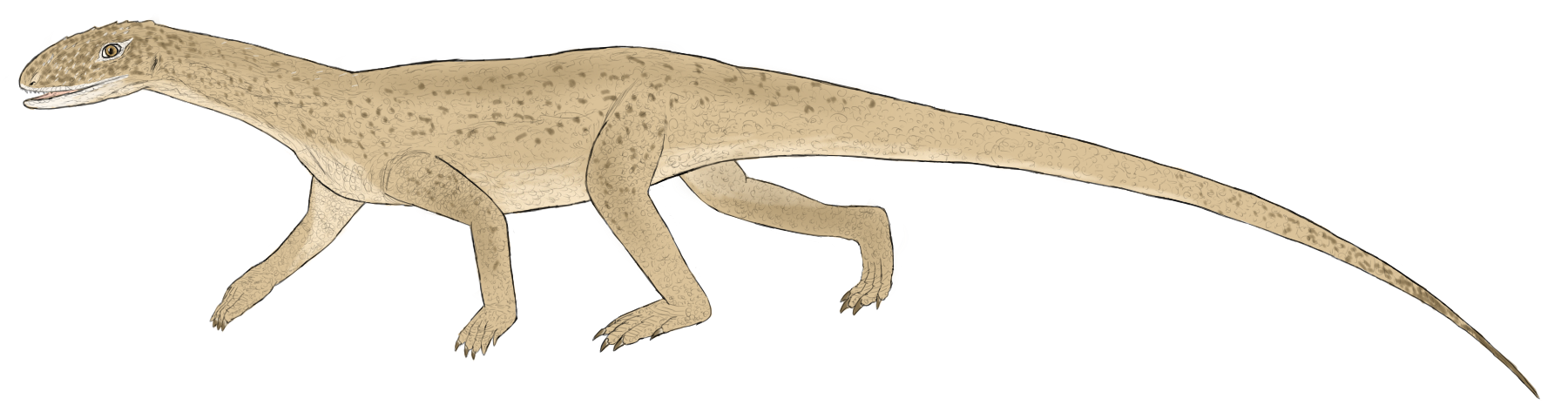
Life restoration

In life, Teleocrater would have been a long-necked and carnivorous quadruped that measured some 7–10 feet (2.1–3.0 m) in length.

=== Skull ===
Carnivory can be inferred for Teleocrater from the single tooth that was preserved, which is compressed, recurved, and bears serrations on both edges. Like other members of the Archosauria, the recess in the maxilla in front of the antorbital fenestra (the antorbital fossa) extends onto the backward-projecting process of the bone, and the palatal projection of the two maxillae contacted each other. Additionally, like early dinosaurs, there is a depression on the frontal bone in front of the supratemporal fenestra (the supratemporal fossa).

=== Axial skeleton ===
The cervical vertebrae of Teleocrater from the front half of the neck are quite long, up to 3.5 times as long as they are high; they are among the longest of Triassic avemetatarsalians. Proportionally, they are longer than either the rest of the cervical vertebrae or any of the vertebrae from the front of the trunk. On the cervical vertebrae, the tops of the neural spines are blade-like, but are accompanied by rounded and roughened projections; the front portions of the neural spines strongly overhang the preceding vertebrae; and the cervical vertebrae from the back of the neck have an additional projection above the parapophysis, previously identified by Nesbitt as part of a "divided parapophysis". These are shared characteristics of the Aphanosauria. In contrast to most other archosauriforms, the openings of the cervical neural canals in Teleocrater are large, subelliptical, and transition from being wider than they are tall at the front of the neck to being taller than they are wide at the back of the neck; this may be unique to the genus. The epipophyses from the front and middle cervical vertebrae project backwards, and, as in Yarasuchus and some pseudosuchians, the back cervical vertebrae appear to have supported three-headed ribs.

On the dorsal vertebrae, the accessory articulations known as the hyposphene-hypantrum articulations are well-developed. Like other aphanosaurians, there are pits located on the side of the base of the dorsal vertebrae. Two vertebrae are associated with the sacrum in Teleocrater; there are three such vertebrae in Nyasasaurus. The ribs associated with the latter sacral vertebra bear processes that project backward and outward, which is only otherwise seen in Yarasuchus, Spondylosoma, and members of the dinosauriforms. There were no bony osteoderms preserved in association with the specimen, which indicates that Teleocrater probably lacked osteoderms, unlike pseudosuchians.

=== Appendicular skeleton ===
Like other archosaurs as well as the proterosuchids, Teleocrater has a distinct acromion process on the scapula, and like silesaurids there is a thin ridge on the back of the bone. The socket of the scapula is oriented downwards and backwards, more so than that of Yarasuchus. On the humerus, there is a long deltopectoral crest that stretches for about 30% of the bone's length, as with other aphanosaurians; such a long crest is also seen in Nyasasaurus and dinosaurs, but not pterosaurs or silesaurids. Another aphanosaurian characteristic is the wide bottom end of the humerus, which is about 30% of the bone's length. The hand was apparently quite small.

Teleocrater is named after its mostly-closed acetabulum, or hip socket (the eponymous "basin"). There is a small and concave notch on the bottom edge of the part of the ilium that extends to meet the ischium, which suggests a small perforation within the acetabulum. This is not a unique characteristic; Asilisaurus and Silesaurus both also possess it. The inner surface of the ilium in front of the acetabulum curves inwards, forming a pocket. Like both Asilisaurus and Marasuchus, the front portion of the ilium is separated from the rest of the bone by a ridge that rises vertically from the top rim of the acetabulum. As in other aphanosaurians, the ischia contact each other extensively along the midline, but less so near the tops of the bones; the bottom back portion of each ischium is rounded, and the top of the shaft of each ischium bears a longitudinal groove.

==== Hindlimb ====
In terms of hindlimb proportions, Teleocrater is more similar to silesaurids, pseudosuchians, and early archosaurs than lagerpetids or ornithodirans, in that the metatarsus is not particularly lengthened with respect to the femur and tibia. The lengthening of the metatarsus in the latter groups probably represent adaptations to running.

The femur of Teleocrater shows a combination of diverse characteristics. Like other aphanosaurians, the top end of the femur bears a transverse groove, and also bears a scar for the attachment of the iliofemoralis externus muscle that is connected to the intermuscular line; the same condition is seen with the anterior trochanter in dinosaurmorphs, yet the scar is clearly separated from that of the iliotrochantericus caudalis as it is in Dongusuchus, Yarasuchus, and early archosaurs. An additional aphanosaurian trait is that the bottom articulating surface of the femur is concave. On this articulating surface, the back of the medial condyle bears a vertical scar, also seen in dinosauromorphs. The femur is overall quite similar to that of Dongusuchus; however, in Teleocrater, the sides of the top end are more rounded and the inner surface is concave, the posteromedial tuber on the top end is convex instead of flat, and the length relative to midshaft width is shorter.

Unlike either proterochampsids or dinosauromorphs, the tibia of Teleocrater does not bear a cnemial crest. The fibula bears a long, twisted crest for the attachment of the iliofibularis, and the front edge of the top of the bone is expanded outwards. Additional features shared by aphanosaurians, silesaurids (namely Asilisaurus and Lewisuchus), and pseudosuchians occur in the calcaneum. It has a convex-concave joint with the astragalus that allows for free movement, a tuber on its surface that is tall, broad, and directed backwards, and its articulation with the fibula is distinctly rounded. Meanwhile, lagerpetids and pterosaurs both lack the tuber (lagerpetids also lack the rounded fibular articulation), and dinosaurs lack the convex-concave joint.

== Discovery and naming ==
The holotype specimen of Teleocrater, NHMUK PV R6795, was found by Francis Rex Parrington in 1933. It consists of a partial, disarticulated skeleton that includes four vertebrae from the neck, seven from the trunk, and seventeen from the tail; parts of one neck and one trunk rib; part of a scapula and coracoid; the radius and ulna from the right forelimb; part of the left ilium; both femora and tibiae, as well as the left fibula; and isolated fragments from metatarsals and phalanges. Parts of the trunk vertebrae and humerus, likely originating from another individual, were referred to the same animal under the specimen number NHMUK PV R6796. Although the exact locality is unknown, Parrington recorded the specimen as originating from near the village of Mkongoleko, "south of river Mkongoleko", in the Ruhuhu Basin of southern Tanzania. These specimens were stored at the Natural History Museum, London.

Alan J. Charig described the remains of Teleocrater in his 1956 PhD thesis for the University of Cambridge. He was the first to apply the name Teleocrater, derived from Greek teleos ("finished", "complete") and krater ("bowl", "basin"), in reference to the closed acetabulum of the animal. His initial thesis listed tanyura as the specific name of Teleocrater; later, in a 1967 overview of reptiles, he revised it to rhadinus, from Greek rhadinos ("slender", in reference to the bodyplan of the animal). However, given that it was never formally published, it remained an invalid nomen nudum.

In 2015, a bonebed designated as Z183 was discovered within 1 kilometre (0.62 mi) of the approximate location described by Parrington. This bonebed contained at least three individuals of different sizes, represented by 27 bones, all of which were mixed in with the remains of an allokotosaurian; new elements not known previously included the maxilla, quadrate, braincase, axis, sacral vertebrae, humeri, ischia, and calcaneum. They were stored at the National Museum of Tanzania. It is quite possible, given the proximity, that this bonebed represents the same site that the original specimens were recovered from. In 2017, these remains, along with the holotype, were described by a study published in Nature, co-authored by Sterling Nesbitt and others. They formally named the genus Teleocrater, and the type and only species T. rhadinus. The late Charig was honoured as a co-author on this study.

Bonebed Z183 belongs to the lower portion of the Lifua Member of the Manda Formation. The bonebed is located in a gully, and is surrounded by pinkish-grey cross-bedded sandstone containing well-rounded quartz pebbles. The sandstone is overlain near the top by reddish-brown and olive-grey siltstone in a digit-like pattern characteristic of point bars; most of the vertebrate remains are concentrated within a 45 centimetres (18 in) section of this overlap. Discontinuous veins, or stringers, of brown claystone are also present. This layer has been biostratigraphically correlated to Subzone B of the South African Cynognathus Assemblage Zone, which is situated in the Anisian epoch of the Triassic period. This makes Teleocrater the oldest known bird-line archosaur, preceding the previous record-holder Asilisaurus.

== Classification ==
Prior to the formalization of the definitions of these groups by Jacques Gauthier in 1986, Teleocrater was variously considered as a rauisuchian, an ornithosuchian (Ornithosuchia being in fact synonymous with Avemetatarsalia), or a thecodont. The position of Teleocrater remained enigmatic due to the absence of additional remains and the lack of a phylogenetic analysis incorporating the taxon. A 2008 histological study of early archosauriforms by Armand de Ricqlès and colleagues tentatively identified Teleocrater as an archosauriform of uncertain phylogenetic placement, but possibly closely related to Eucrocopoda.

Nesbitt et al. utilized two phylogenetic datasets to analyze the affinities of Teleocrater: one published by Nesbitt himself in 2011, and another published by Martín D. Ezcurra in 2016. In addition to Teleocrater, the similarly problematic Yonghesuchus, Dongusuchus, Spondylosoma, and Scleromochlus were also added to the dataset in order to test their relationships. Analyses based on both datasets consistently recovered a monophyletic group containing Teleocrater, Yarasuchus, Dongusuchus, and Spondylosoma, with Spondylosoma forming the sister group to a polytomy containing the other three. This group is differentiated from other archosauriforms by fifteen shared characters, one of them an unambiguous synapomorphy (the overhang of the cervical neural spines). Nesbitt et al. named this group the Aphanosauria, defined as the most inclusive clade containing Teleocrater rhadinus and Yarasuchus deccanensis but not Passer domesticus or Crocodylus niloticus. The results of the analyses are reproduced below, based primarily on the Ezcurra dataset but incorporating the avemetatarsalian topology of the Nesbitt dataset.

- Archosauriformes
  - Proterosuchidae
  - - Erythrosuchidae
    - Eucrocopoda
      - Proterochampsia
      - Archosauria
        - Pseudosuchia
        - Avemetatarsalia
          - Ornithodira
            - Pterosauria
            - - Lagerpetidae
              - Dinosauriformes
                - Marasuchus
                - - Silesauridae
                  - Dinosauria
          - Aphanosauria
            - Spondylosoma
            - - Yarasuchus
              - Dongusuchus
              - Teleocrater

The inclusion of Scleromochlus altered the topology obtained to varying extents, although both analyses recovered it as an avemetatarsalian. In the Nesbitt dataset, Scleromochlus collapsed Avemetatarsalia into a polytomy containing itself, Spondylosoma, the other aphanosaurians, pterosaurs, lagerpetids, and dinosauriforms. Meanwhile, in the Ezcurra dataset, Scleromochlus formed a polytomy with lagerpetids and dinosauriforms. Nesbitt et al. emphasized that characteristics of pelvic and leg anatomy could not be assessed for Scleromochlus due to conflicting descriptions and poor quality of skeletal casts; these characteristics play a substantial role in the topology of basal avemetatarsalians.

Traditionally, the "crocodile-normal" and "advanced mesotarsal" ankle arrangements have been considered as a dichotomy among archosaurs: early archosaurs and pseudosuchians possess the more mobile "crocodile-normal" configuration, while pterosaurs and dinosauromorphs (including birds) possess the stiffer "advanced mesotarsal" configuration. The presence of the "crocodile-normal" ankle in Teleocrater (convex joint with the astragalus, presence of a tuber, and the convexity of the fibular facet on the calcaneum) indicates that this configuration was probably plesiomorphic for archosaurs, including avemetatarsalians, supported by reconstructions of character state evolution using the two datasets. At the same time, features associated with the "advanced mesotarsal" ankle (lack of a tuber and the concavity of the fibular facet on the calcaneum) were reconstructed as having appeared at least two different times among ornithodirans, with basal dinosaurs also possessing a mixture of "crocodile-normal" and "advanced mesotarsal" characteristics. This demonstrates that the evolution of ankle morphology in avemetatarsalians is more complex than previously thought, and led Nesbitt et al. to conclude that the strict "crocodile-normal"/"advanced mesotarsal" dichotomy is reductionist.

== Paleobiology ==
=== Histology and growth ===
Nesbitt et al. examined cross-sections from the fibula of Teleocrater. The cortical bone was thin, measuring about 1–1.5 millimetres (0.039–0.059 in) thick. Primary woven-fibered bone with no signs of remodeling comprises the entirety of the cortex, and the vascular canals are all longitudinal primary osteons, arranged in some parts as concentric bands within the cortex; parallel-fibered bone and radial osteons are present locally. Disorganized osteocytes were abundant in the cortex. The outer cortex contains lines of arrested growth, but does not contain an external fundamental system (an indicator of maturity). The humerus was similar, albeit with many of the longitudinal osteons being anastomotically linked.

Similar results were reached by Ricqlès et al., who analyzed a cross-section from a metatarsal. The cortex likewise consists entirely of the primary layer, with the vascular canals consisting of longitudinal osteons that are less dense in the peripheries of the cortex. The interior medullary cavity of the bone is occupied by dense spongy endosteum; the trabecula is missing. Overall, histology suggests that specimens of Teleocrater were rapidly growing at time of death. The dense vasularization, anastomosis in the humerus, and disorganization of osteocytes indicates a growth rate higher than more basal archosaurs and comparable to silesaurids, but less than that of Nyasasaurus, pterosaurs, and dinosaurs.

== Paleoecology ==
In Bonebed Z183, from where the newer specimens of Teleocrater (and possibly the type specimen) are known, the fauna can generally divided into two types. Larger bones originate from the dicynodont Dolichuranus sp. and the cynodont Cynognathus sp.; they tend to be closely associated and semi-articulated, suggesting minimal transportation by water after death. Smaller bones originate from Teleocrater rhadinus, the temnospondyl "Stanocephalosaurus" pronus, an unnamed allokotosaurian, and another unnamed small reptile; they tend to be more fragmented, suggesting that they were worn and transported by several floods before they were finally deposited. Overall, the preservational environment is consistent with the crevasse splay of a floodplain, where the animals were killed and transported by sheetfloods before being buried by the crevasse splay complex. Elsewhere in the assemblage of the lower Lifua Member, the ctenosauriscid Hypselorhachis mirabilis is also present.
