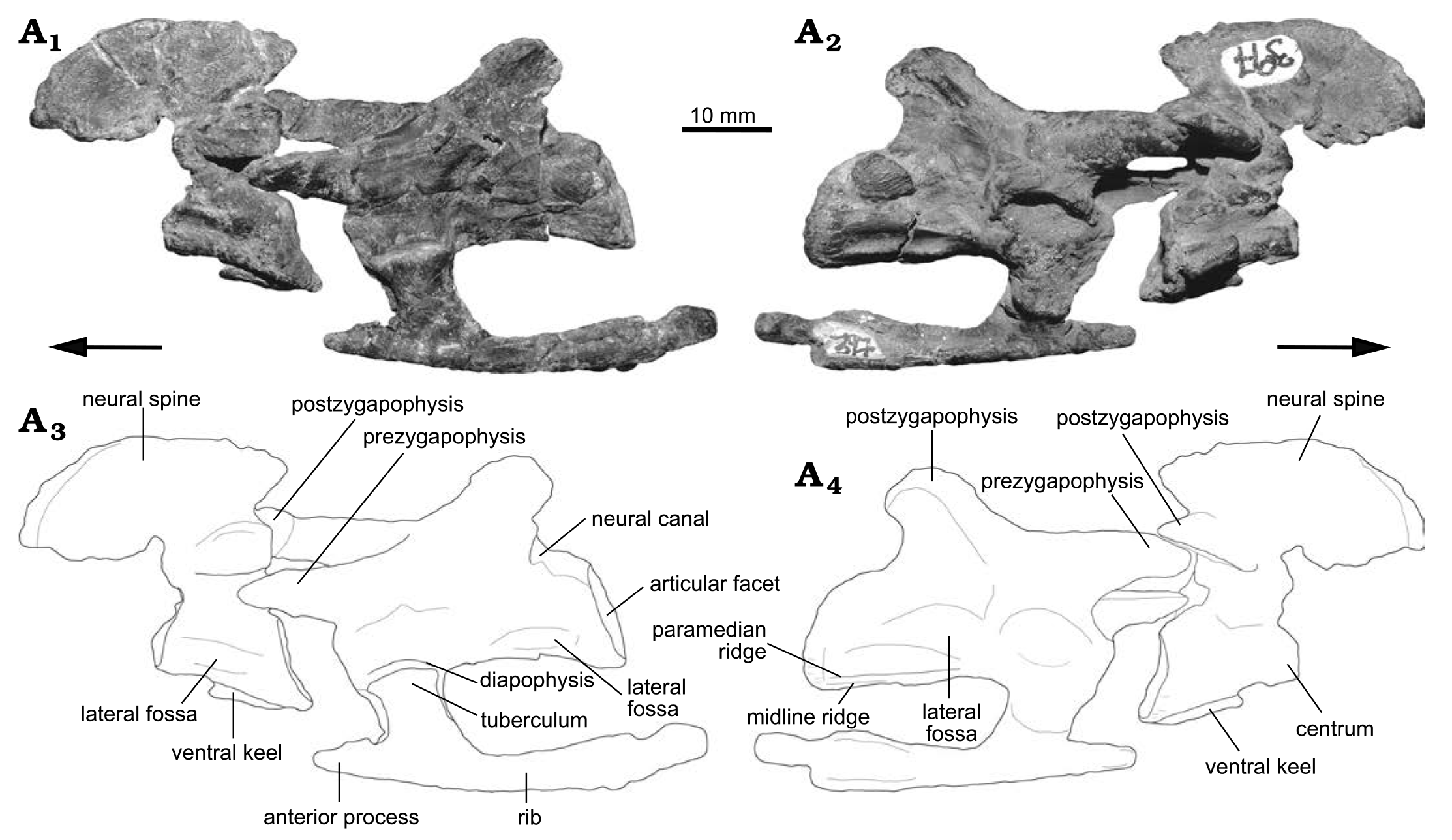
- Axis and third cervical of the holotype of Incertovenator (PVSJ 397)

Scientific classification
- Kingdom: Animalia
- Phylum: Chordata
- Class: Reptilia
- Clade: Eucrocopoda
- Clade: Archosauria (?)
- Genus: †Incertovenator; Yáñez et al., 2021
- Species: †I. longicollum

Binomial name
- †Incertovenator longicollum Yáñez et al., 2021

= Incertovenator =

Incertovenator Temporal range: Late Triassic, Carnian ~231.1 Ma

Extinct genus of probable archosaur

Incertovenator (meaning "uncertain hunter") is an extinct genus of archosauriform reptile, likely an archosaur, of uncertain affinities. Its unstable position is a result of possessing a number features found in both the bird-line avemetatarsalian archosaurs and the crocodylian-line pseudosuchians. The type and only known species is I. longicollum, which is known from single specimen discovered in the Late Triassic (Carnian aged) Ischigualasto Formation of Argentina. Incertovenator is known almost entirely by its vertebral column. This indicates that it had a relatively long neck, leading to its uncertain classification due to the convergent evolution of elongated neck vertebrae in both avemetatarsalian and pseudosuchian archosaurs.

== Discovery and naming ==
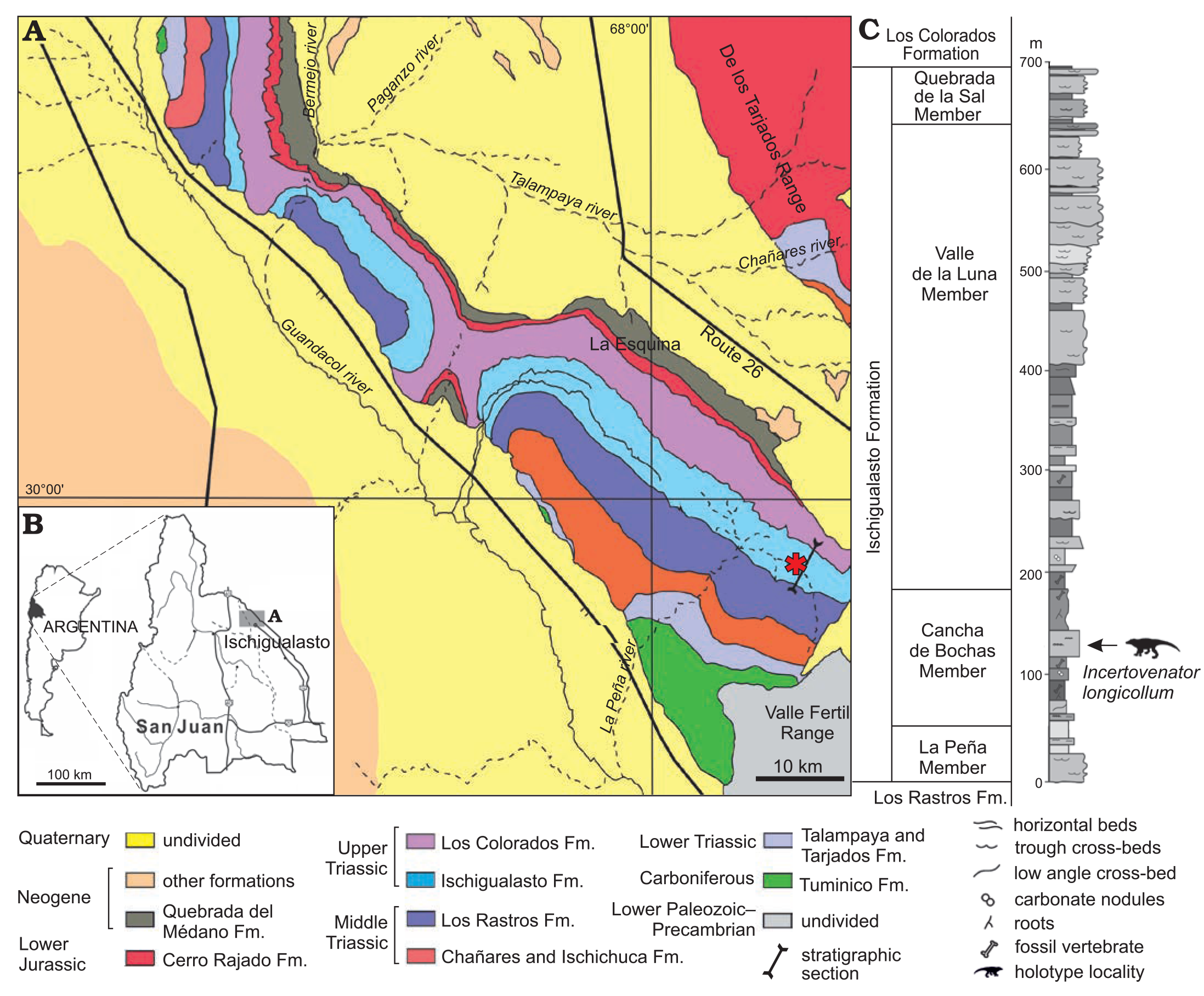
Map of the type locality of PVSJ 397 within the Ischigualasto Formation.

The type and only known specimen of Incertovenator, PVSJ 397, was discovered in the Cancha de Bochas member of the Ischigualasto Formation. The specimen was found at the Hoyada de Ischigualasto locality in the southern region of Ischigualasto Provincial Park, stratigraphically positioned at roughly mid-level in the Cancha de Bochas member, approximately 120 metres (390 ft) above the base of the Ischigualasto Formation. The specimen was formally described in 2021 by Imanol Yáñez, Diego Pol, Juan Martín Leardi, Oscar A. Alcober, and Ricardo N. Martínez, and is held in the Museo de Ciencias Naturales at the National University of San Juan, Argentina.

The specimen is almost entirely known by its vertebral column (axial skeleton): five cervical vertebrae (including the axis), ten articulated mid-to-posterior dorsal vertebrae, two sacral vertebrae, and six caudal vertebrae (five of which are complete). The only other bones found with the specimen are a complete ilium and two unidentifiable bone fragments. The specimen is preserved partially articulated. However, the overall preservation is poor, with a dark reddish-brown to grey colouration indicative of a haematite coating and permineralization. Additionally, the deformation has distorted the shape of the vertebrae and parts of them have been cracked and weathered away.

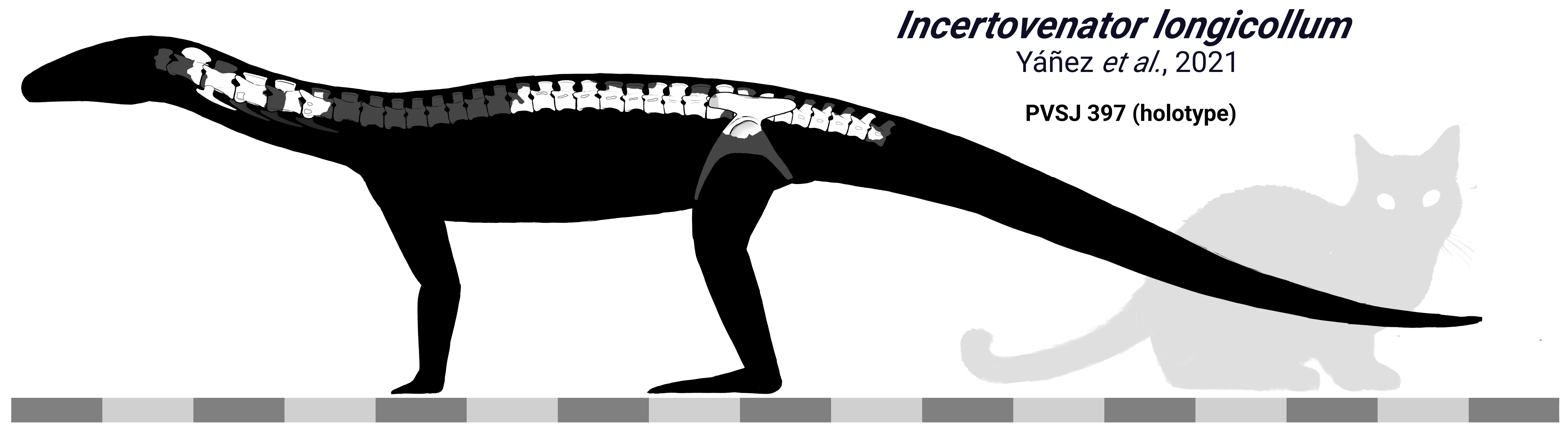
Skeletal diagram showcasing known remains (in white)

The generic name comes from the Latin words incerto- (uncertain) and venator (hunter), referencing its uncertain phylogenetic relationships to other archosaurs and its presumed predatory lifestyle. Likewise, the specific name is from Latin longus and collum, meaning "long neck", in recognition of its notably elongated cervical vertebrae.

== Description ==
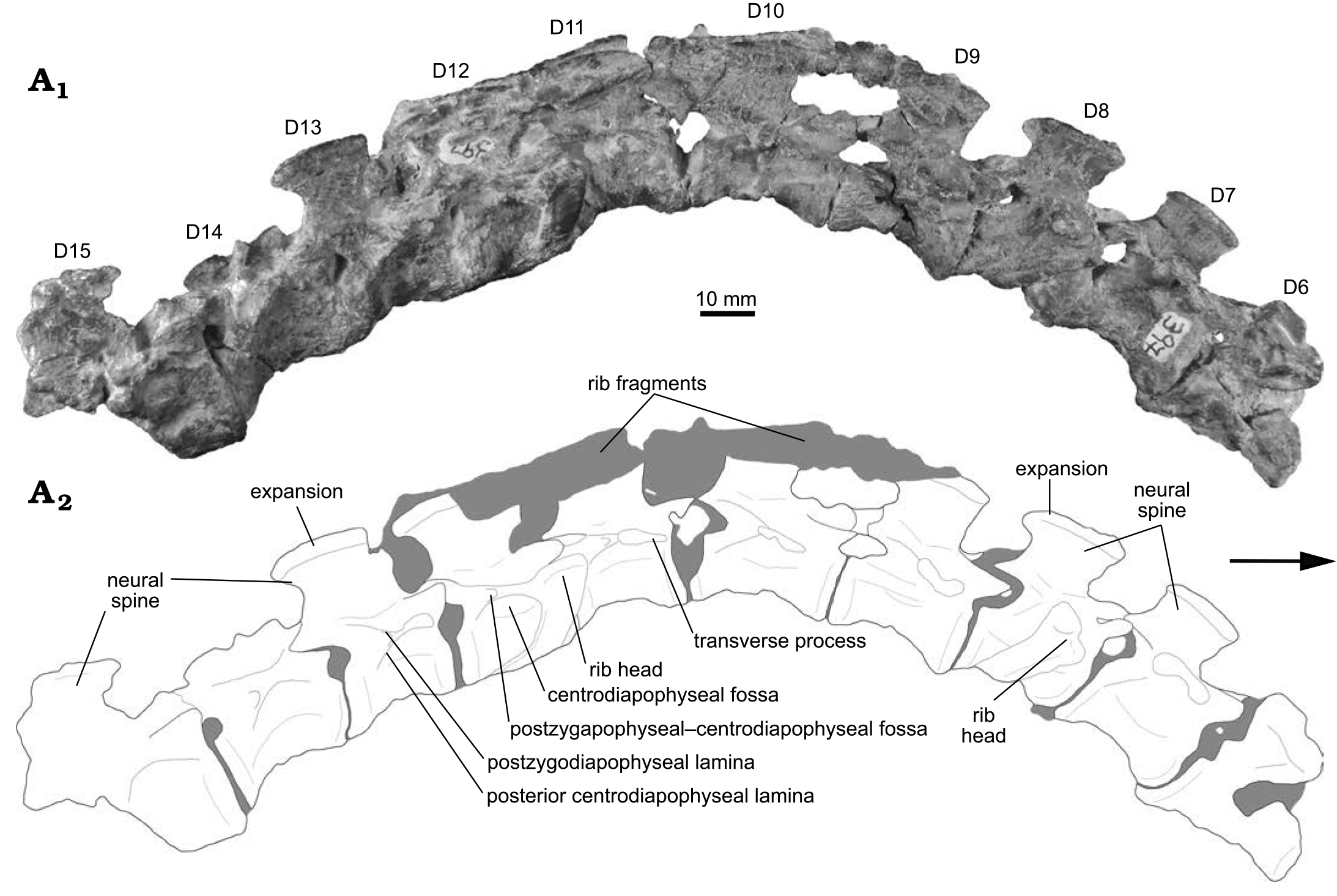
Articulated dorsal vertebrae of Incertovenator

As it is known almost entirely from vertebrae, little can be confidently said about the life appearance of Incertovenator, apart from it having a relatively long neck. However, it was likely a quadruped, similar to the majority of other early-diverging archosaurs, including potential relatives (aphanosaurs and early-diverging loricatans).

The axial skeleton of Incertovenator is well-known, with vertebrae from all the major regions of the spine (cervicals, dorsals, sacrals and caudals) as well as associated ribs. The cervicals are characteristically elongated, with centra (the main body of the vertebra) 2.5 times as long as they are wide. The neural spines are similarly longer than high, and overhang each centrum at the front with tips that are expanded and rugosely textured.

The dorsal vertebrae are shorter than the cervicals, but are still relatively long compared with other archosaurs; their centra are both longer than they are tall, and taller than wide. Unlike the cervicals, they lack a keel on their underside and have no hollowed out fossae on their surfaces. The neural spines, however, are similar to the cervicals' in that they are long and low, roughly similar in height to the centra. This trait is unusual for aphanosaurs, but similar to some dinosauromorphs, crocodylomorphs and Mandasuchus.

Incertovenator has only two sacral vertebrae, the ancestral condition for archosaurs, and they are unfused. Their neural spines are low, like the dorsals, although the first sacral spine has a slight forward slant and the second resembles that of the axis, with an arched upper margin. The caudal centra are also longer than they are high, although they gradually become shorter moving down the tail. The neural spines are also similar to those of the dorsals, although they shift from a roughly central position from the first caudal towards the back of the centrum by the fifth caudal.

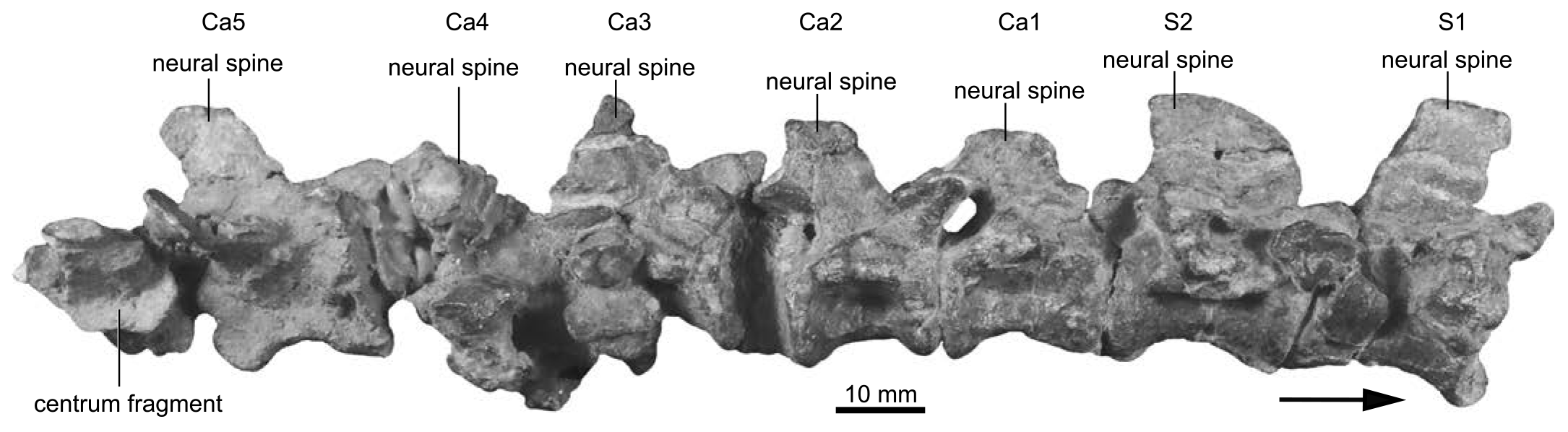
Sacral and first six caudal vertebrae of Incertovenator

The only other known part of the skeleton is the ilium, the large hip bone that forms the top part of the pelvis. The most notable feature of the ilium is the elongated preacetabular process projecting forward beyond the acetabulum (hip socket). This is an uncommon feature of early archosaurs, and is otherwise only known to occur in poposauroids, crocodylomorphs, pterosaurs and dinosaurs. The ilium also has a concave upper margin when seen from the side. The acetabulum (hip socket) is completely closed, and has a prominent roof formed by a supraacetabular crest, a ridge of bone bordering the top and front of the acetabulum. This relatively long supraacetabular crest is similar to some early crocodylomorphs (e.g. Trialestes) but not others (e.g. Terrestrisuchus). The joint between the peduncles for the attachment of the pubis and ischium is triangular, with an angle of roughly 140° between them. This is typical of most pseudosuchians and early avemetatarsalians, but unlike the concave margin of dinosaurs, poposauroids and most crocodylomorphs.

== Classification ==
When introduced to a dataset of Triassic archosauriforms, Incertovenator was able to occupy multiple equally parsimonious positions in the resulting cladogram (shown below), making it difficult to determine its true evolutionary relationships. Incertovenator was able to occupy these differing positions due to it possessing various traits associated with distinct lineages of early-diverging archosaurs, namely convergent traits related to an elongated neck. For example, it shares with various aphanosaurs mid-cervicals longer than its mid-dorsals, cervical neural spines with expanded tips and a roughened texture, dorsal neural spines with expanded, rounded tips, and cervical neural spines that slant forwards at their front edge (a trait previously interpreted as an unambiguous synapomorphy of aphanosaurs). Alternatively, a position in Pseudosuchia related to Mandasuchus is supported by sharing a convex dorsal margin of the axial neural spine and a forward slant to the front face of their cervicals.

The cladogram below is reproduced and simplified from Yáñez et al., 2021:

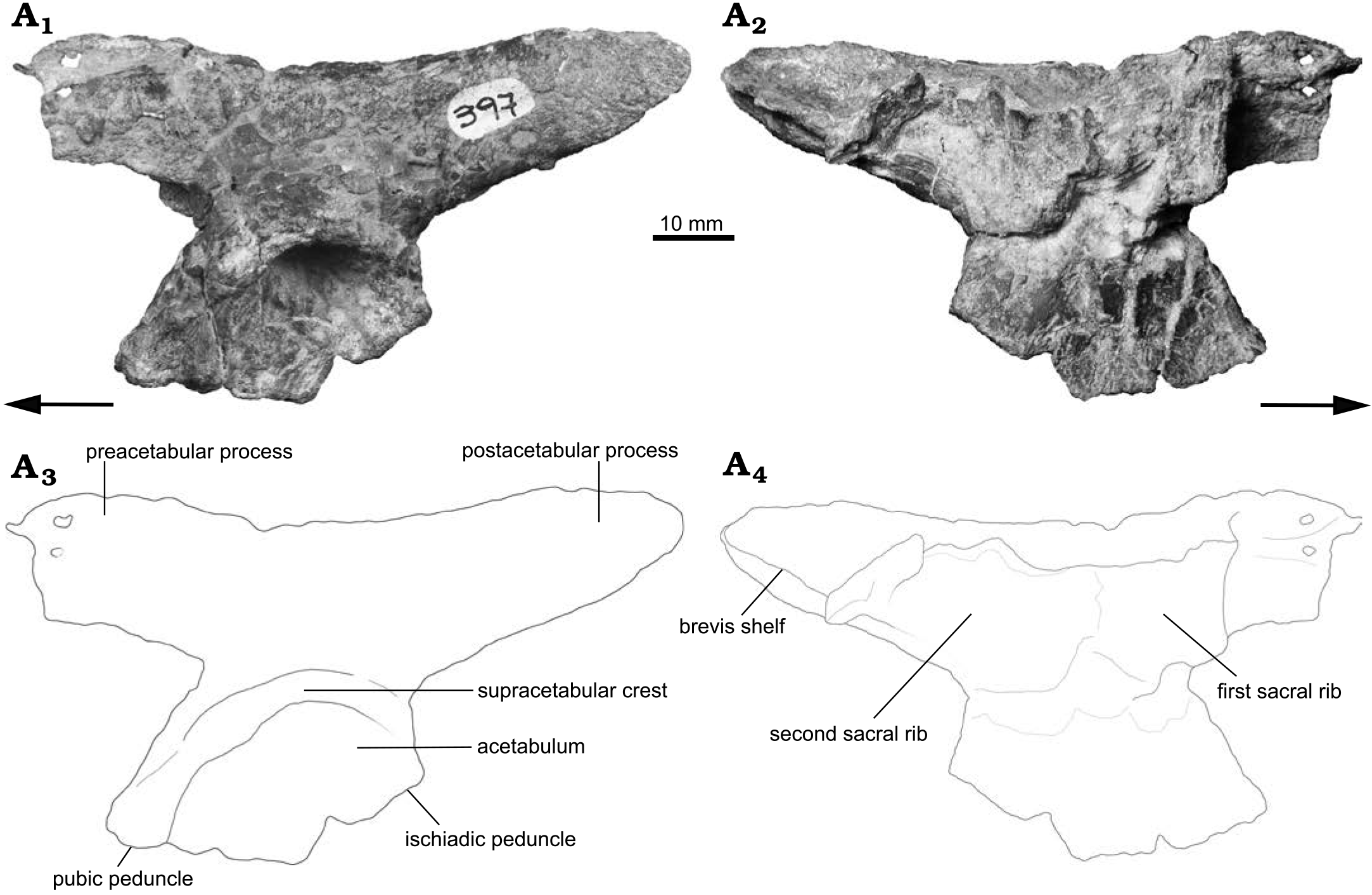
Ilium of Incertovenator, note the relatively long preacetabular process.

- Archosauria
  - - Incertovenator
    - Avemetatarsalia
      - - Incertovenator
        - Spondylosoma
      - - Incertovenator
        - - Teleocrater
          - Dongusuchus
          - Yarasuchus
      - - Incertovenator
        - Ornithodira
  - Pseudosuchia
    - Ornithosuchidae
    - - - Revueltosaurus
        - Aetosauria
      - - - Turfanosuchus
          - - Yonghesuchus
            - Gracilisuchus
        - - Ticinosuchus
          - Paracrocodylomorpha
            - Poposauroidea
            - Loricata
              - - Incertovenator
                - Mandasuchus
              - - Prestosuchus
                - - Saurosuchus
                  - - Batrachotomus
                    - - Fasolasuchus
                      - - Rauisuchidae
                        - Crocodylomorpha

Additional suboptimal positions were also identified on the cladogram, including as the sister taxon to pterosaurs or gracilisuchids (one step longer), or various positions within Dinosauromorpha, Poposauroidea and elsewhere among early suchians, early diverging crocodylomorphs, and in one analysis even as the sister taxon to the non-archosaur proterochampsid Tropidosuchus. Some of these positions were also associated with the elongation of the cervicals, although notably the shape of the ilium is similar to early crocodylomorphs, derived poposauroids, pterosaurs and dinosaurs, namely the long preacetabular process. These conflicting signals cloud its relationship to other archosaurs even further.

== Palaeoecology ==
As indicated by its name, Incertovenator was presumed to be a predator, largely due to the convergent evolution of similar long-necks being associated with small-sized predatory archosaurs. The Cancha de Brochas member is correlated with the Scaphonyx-Exaeretodon-Herrerasaurus Biozone, in which Incertovenator coexisted with the dinosaurs Eoraptor, Herrerasaurus, Sanjuansaurus and Chromogisaurus, as well as the pseudosuchians Saurosuchus, Sillosuchus and Trialestes. It also coexisted with various other reptiles, including the abundant rhynchosaur Hyperodapedon (="Scaphonyx"), the aetosaur Aetosauroides, the silesaurid Ignotosaurus, and the two proterochampsids Proterochampsa and Pseudochampsa. Coeval synapsids include the large dicynodont Ischigualastia and the cynodonts Chiniquodon, Diegocanis, Ecteninion, and Exaeretodon.
