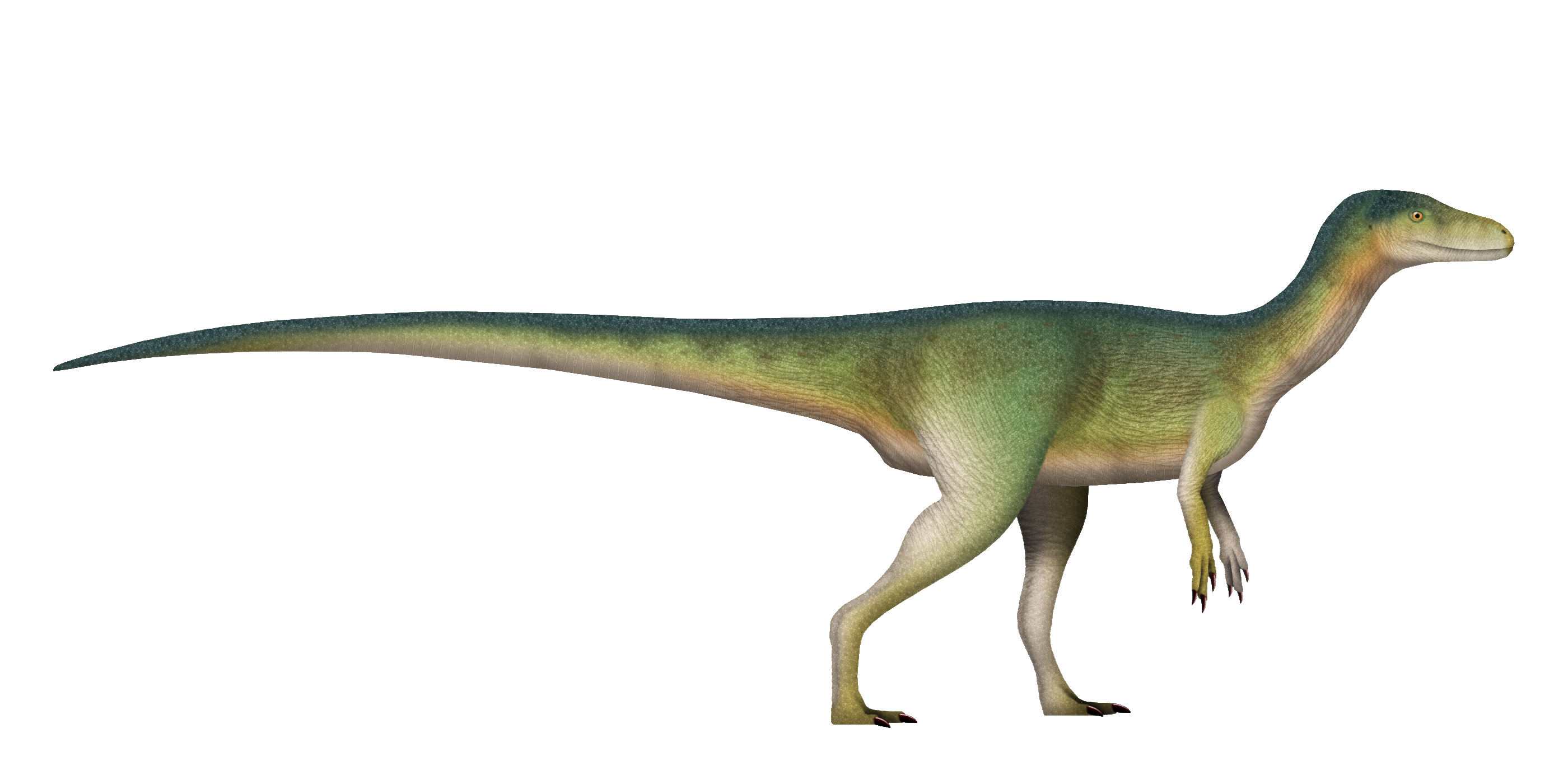
- Speculative life restoration

Scientific classification
- Kingdom: Animalia
- Phylum: Chordata
- Class: Reptilia
- Clade: Archosauria
- Clade: Avemetatarsalia
- Clade: Ornithodira
- Clade: Dinosauromorpha (?)
- Genus: †Nyasasaurus; Nesbitt et al., 2013

Type species
- †Nyasasaurus parringtoni Nesbitt et al., 2013

Synonyms
- Nyasaurus White, 1973 (sic); Thecodontosaurus alophos Haughton, 1932 (in part)

= Nyasasaurus =

Nyasasaurus Temporal range: ?Anisian ?243 Ma

Extinct genus of reptiles

Nyasasaurus (meaning "Lake Nyasa lizard") is an extinct genus of avemetatarsalian archosaur from the putatively Middle Triassic Manda Formation of Tanzania that may be the earliest known dinosaur. The type species Nyasasaurus parringtoni was first described in 1956 in the doctoral thesis of English paleontologist Alan J. Charig, but it was not formally described until 2013.

Previously, the oldest record of dinosaurs was from Brazil and Argentina and dated back to the mid-late Carnian stage, about 233.23 to 231.4 million years ago. Nyasasaurus comes from a deposit conventionally considered Anisian in age, meaning that it would predate other early dinosaurs by about 12 million years. Some studies cast doubt on this age, suggesting that the deposits may actually be Carnian in age, which would considerably reduce this temporal gap. However, this claim has been heavily disputed, and more accurate dating methods are needed to resolve the debate.

== History of study ==
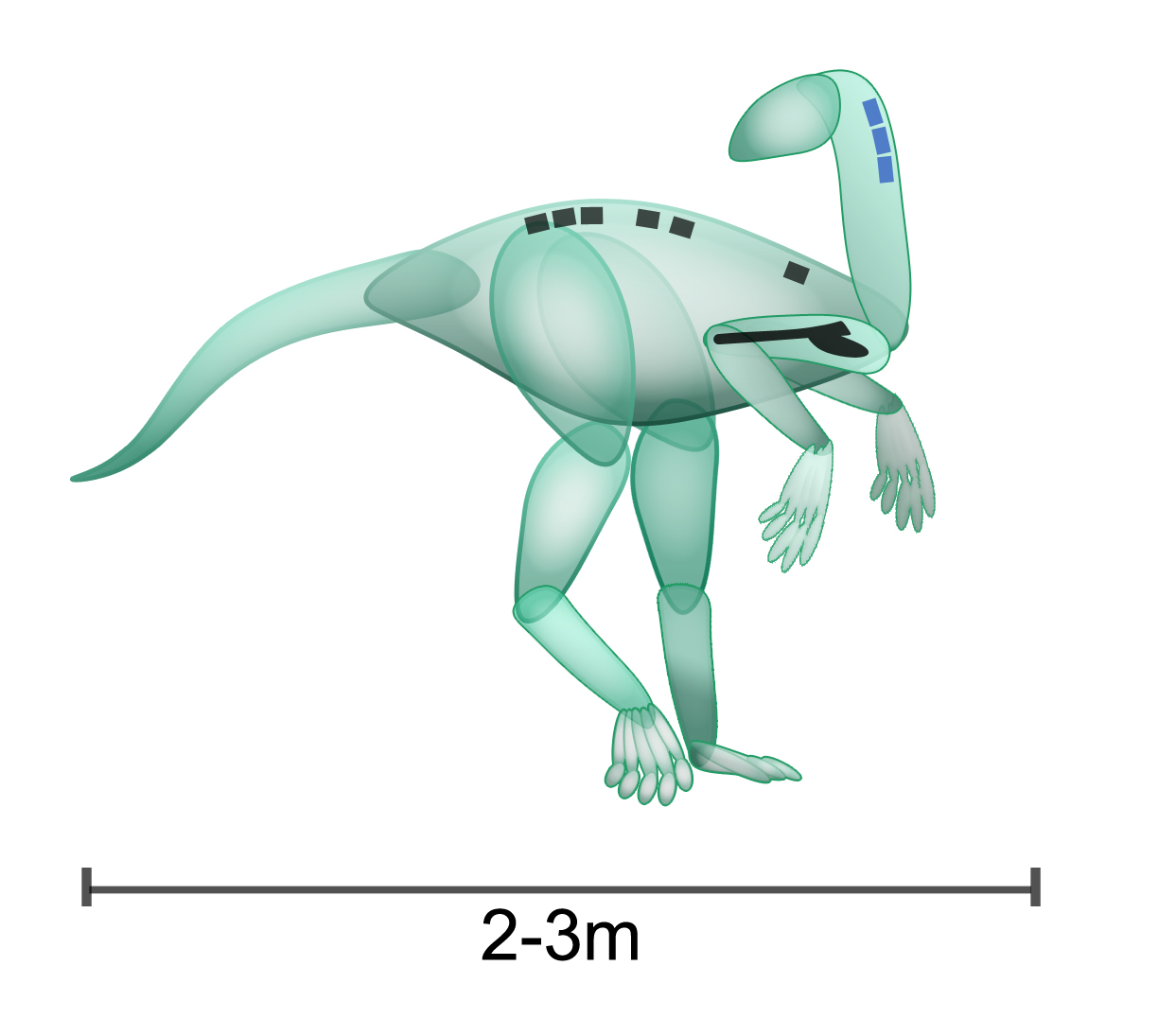
Approximation of animal based on partial skeleton shown in black (first specimen, six vertebrae and a humerus) and blue (second specimen, three cervical vertebrae)

In the 1930s, the holotype of Nyasasaurus was collected in Parrington's locality B36 from the Lifua Member of the Manda Formation, Ruhuhu Basin near Lake Nyasa in southern Tanzania by Francis Rex Parrington. Other fossils from the same locality included those of cynodonts, dicynodonts, and rhynchosaurs. Most, including those of Nyasasaurus, consist only of fragments of bone. The remains were first described in English paleontologist Alan J. Charig's 1956 doctoral thesis and referred to as "Specimen 50b". In 1967 Charig used the name "Nyasasaurus cromptoni", in a review of Archosauria, but without any description, so it was commonly considered a nomen nudum; the dissertation was also never published. The generic name referred to Lake Nyasa and the specific name honouring Alfred Crompton. In 2013 a new description was published by Sterling Nesbitt, Paul Barrett, Sarah Werning and Christian Sidor, including the late Charig as posthumous co-author, ensuring the validity of the name Nyasasaurus, though the specific name was changed to parringtoni, in honour of Parrington. The generic name is occasionally misspelled as "Nyasaurus", as by Theodore Elmer White in 1973.

The referred specimen of Nyasasaurus, SAM-PK-K10654, was collected by G. M. Stockley in the early 1930s in the western portion of the Manda Formation at Stockley's locality B27. This locality is listed as a locality from the "Upper Bone Bed" of the Manda Formation (currently understood to be from the Lifua Member) by Haughton (1932). The specimen was collected under a single field number, S507, presumably from a small area. The specimen was probably associated as evidenced by the bone quality, color and surrounding matrix (dark gray to black carbonate). The consistent sizes of the remains indicate that they probably represent a single individual.

Stockley's locality B27 is located near the village of Gingama and it was probably the only specimen found at this locality, although a nearby locality B26, also listed as Gingama, produced cynodonts, lungfish, amphibians, and a shark. Dicynodonts, cynodonts and archosaurs such as Asilisaurus were also found nearby in the Lifua Member.

The name Thecodontosaurus alophos was coined for this specimen by Haughton (1932). Its holotype consists of three cervical vertebrae and two middle to posterior dorsal vertebrae that are poorly preserved as they are highly fractured and parts of the bone and bone surfaces are eroded. Originally, a comparison of Thecodontosaurus alophos was made only with Coelophysis longicollis. Since then, the species has been largely ignored by all subsequent vertebrate workers and no formal diagnosis of the specimen was ever provided. Nesbitt et al. (2013) found the specimen to not be diagnostic because it does not have any autapomorphic features or a unique combination of characteristics. Therefore, they suggested to abandon the name Thecodontosaurus alophos and to refer its specimen to Nyasasaurus parringtoni.

== Description ==
The type specimen, NHMUK PV R 6856, is a partial skeleton belonging to an individual estimated to have been two to three metres in length. It consists of a right humerus, three partial sacral vertebrae and three presacral vertebrae. A second specimen, SAM-PK-K10654 consisting of three cervical vertebrae and two posterior presacral vertebrae, is also known. It was attributed to the same species as NHMUK R6856 because the dorsal or back vertebrae of the two specimens are nearly identical. However, the vertebral features that link NHMUK PV R 6856 and SAM-PK-K10654, including a connection between two bony projections called the hyposphene and hypantrum, are also found in other Triassic archosaurs. Since these characteristics are not unique to the two species they do not by themselves provide sufficient evidence for grouping NHMUK PV R 6856 and SAM-PK-K10654 under the same species. The 2013 description of Nyasasaurus by Sterling Nesbitt, Paul Barrett, Sarah Werning and Christian Sidor used a second line of evidence, the similar positions of the two specimens on the evolutionary tree, to justify their placement as the same species.

The study also mentioned the similarity between the presacral vertebrae of both specimens of Nyasasaurus parringtoni and those of the enigmatic avemetatarsalian archosaur, Teleocrater rhadinus. Additionally, the anterior cervical vertebra attributed to NHMUK PV R 6795 is extremely elongated relative to that of the middle dorsal vertebrae with a low centrum to neural arch ratio and a significant displacement between the two sides of the articular facet of the centrum. However, it is probable that the limb bones and other elements included in NHMUK PV R 6795 do not belong to the same individual. Therefore, it is possible that the vertebrae of Teleocrater rhadinus are also referable to Nyasasaurus parringtoni.

An analysis of the interior structure of the humerus indicates that bone growth was rapid, with interwoven bone fibers, many channels for blood vessels that radiate in all directions, and few lines of arrested growth. This structure more closely matches that of the early dinosaur Coelophysis than it does of dinosaur ancestors, suggesting that Nyasasaurus was closer to the ancestry of dinosaurs than other archosaurs at the time.

== Classification ==
Because it is based on incomplete remains, Nyasasaurus has been difficult to classify. It can be placed confidently within Archosauria, the clade of reptiles represented today by crocodilians and birds, Dinosauriformes, the clade that includes birds, dinosaurs, and several non-dinosaurian groups from the Triassic, and possibly within Dinosauria, the clade of dinosaurs.

Nyasasaurus was suggested to have been a primitive prosauropod dinosaur in 1986, but this hypothesis was disputed. The 2013 study suggests that Nyasasaurus may be the earliest known dinosaur, dating to the late Anisian stage, about 243 million years ago, 10 to 15 million years older than any previously described dinosaur, such as Herrerasaurus. However, this age is being questioned by other papers.

Dinosaur affinities of the holotype are supported by the long deltopectoral crest on the humerus, an unambiguously dinosaur top, another feature present only in dinosaurs. The humerus does not share any synapomorphies exclusively with any other Triassic archosaur clade. The supposed possession of three sacral vertebrae instead of two could represent a dinosaur plesiomorphy, but has a complex distribution among dinosauriforms. The elongated neck vertebrae with hollowed-out sides of the referred specimen provides two characters that are exclusive to the derived silesaurid Silesaurus (but absent in the earlier and more basal silesaurid Asilisaurus), and to early theropod dinosaurs. These characters can be interpreted as possibly homologous with features that represent unambiguously skeletal pneumaticity in theropods.

Nesbitt et al. (2013) incorporated both specimens, NHMUK PV R 6856 and SAM-PK-K10654, into a phylogenetic analysis. This analysis was based on data from a 2011 analysis by Sterling Nesbitt that included many Triassic archosaurs. When NHMUK R6856 was added to the data set, several possible relationships were found. Various possible evolutionary trees place it as the sister taxon of Dinosauria, the most basal member of Ornithischia (the group that includes most herbivorous Mesozoic dinosaurs), or a member of Theropoda (the group that includes most carnivorous dinosaurs as well as birds). When SAM-PK-K10654 was added to the analysis, it was found to be a theropod. SAM-PK-K10654 possesses several theropod features, including deep pits or fossae in its neck vertebrae, which are not found in NHMUK PV R 6856 because of the limited overlap between the specimens. The following cladogram depicts these possibilities:

- Archosauria
  - Pseudosuchia (including crocodilians)
  - - Pterosauromorpha
    - - Lagerpetidae
      - Dinosauriformes
        - Marasuchus lilloensis
        - - Silesauridae
          - - NHMUK PV R 6856
            - Dinosauria
              - Ornithischia
                - NHMUK PV R 6856
                - Other ornithischians
              - Saurischia
                - Sauropoda
                - Theropoda
                  - Herrerasaurus ischigualastensis
                  - - Staurikosaurus pricei
                    - - Eoraptor lunensis
                      - - SAM-PK-K10654
                        - - Tawa hallae
                          - - Coelophysis bauri
                            - - - NHMUK PV R 6856
                                - Dilophosaurus wetherilli
                              - Other theropods (including birds)

A large phylogenetic analysis of early dinosaurs and dinosauromorphs by Matthew Baron, David B. Norman and Paul Barrett (2017) found that Nyasasaurus may represent a derived member of Sauropodomorpha most closely related to massospondylids like Massospondylus and Lufengosaurus. In his 2018 thesis on dinosaur interrelationships, Matthew Baron cast doubt on the referral of "Thecodontosaurus" alophos to Nyasasaurus, arguing that SAM-PK-K10654 instead represents a neotheropod due to the lack of skeletal pneumaticity seen in massospondylids.

In 2021, Fernando Novas and colleagues used the aforementioned characteristics shared by Nyasasaurus and Teleocrater—and not by dinosauriforms such as Asilisaurus and Silesaurus—to suggest that a position for Nyasasaurus in the Dinosauriformes is uncertain. However, they elected not to comment further on Nyasasaurus' affinities given the fragmentary nature of the fossils.

== Age ==
The age of Nyasasaurus, as well as the Manda Formation it belongs to, is controversial. Biostratigraphy based on the synapsid fauna (Cynognathus, Diademodon, Kannemeyeria) has correlated the formation with subzone B and C of the South African Cynognathus assemblage zone (CAZ). The fauna of the upper CAZ are typically considered to be Anisian in age. The presence of traversodontids in the younger levels of the formation, which do not co-occur with the CAZ fauna in South Africa, suggests that these younger levels may be late Anisian.

More recently, SHRIMP Uranium-Lead dating obtained an age of 233.8-237.8 Ma from an ignimbrite layer directly underlying the Río Seco de la Quebrada Formation, another putatively Anisian formation with CAZ fauna. These point to an unusually young (Carnian) age for the formation, up to 10 million years younger than biostratigraphy would indicate. This may imply that the CAZ fauna is not as old as traditional biostratigraphy has argued, or that the CAZ fauna persisted in some areas much longer than previously thought. If the former is true, this would mean that the Manda Formation, including Nyasasaurus, is actually Carnian in age, drastically reducing the temporal gap between Nyasasaurus and other putative early dinosaurs.

Not all paleontologists are convinced by this, however. The estimated early Carnian age of the Río Seco de la Quebrada Formation is similar to that dated for the Chañares Formation in La Rioja Province, Argentina. However, the Chañares Formation lacks CAZ fauna, instead preserving more advanced species of cynodonts, dicynodonts, and archosauromorphs. This contradicts the widespread distribution of CAZ fauna and its close proximity to the Río Seco de la Quebrada Formation, implying a large temporal gap between the RSQ and Chañares formations. The dating methods used for finding the age of the RSQ have also been criticized based on the argument that SHRIMP dating is less accurate than CA-TIMS dating. More widespread radiometric dating is required to clarify the temporal extent of the CAZ fauna. The upper Ermaying Formation of China is correlated with subzone C of the Cynognathus assemblage zone based on the presence of Shansiodon, and it is considered to be late Anisian based on CA-TIMS Uranium-Lead dating.

== See also ==
- Eoraptor
- Alwalkeria
- Agnosphitys
- Dinosaur evolution

Contemporaries

- Stenaulorhynchus
