= Epipophyses =

Bony projections of neck vertebrae in certain reptiles

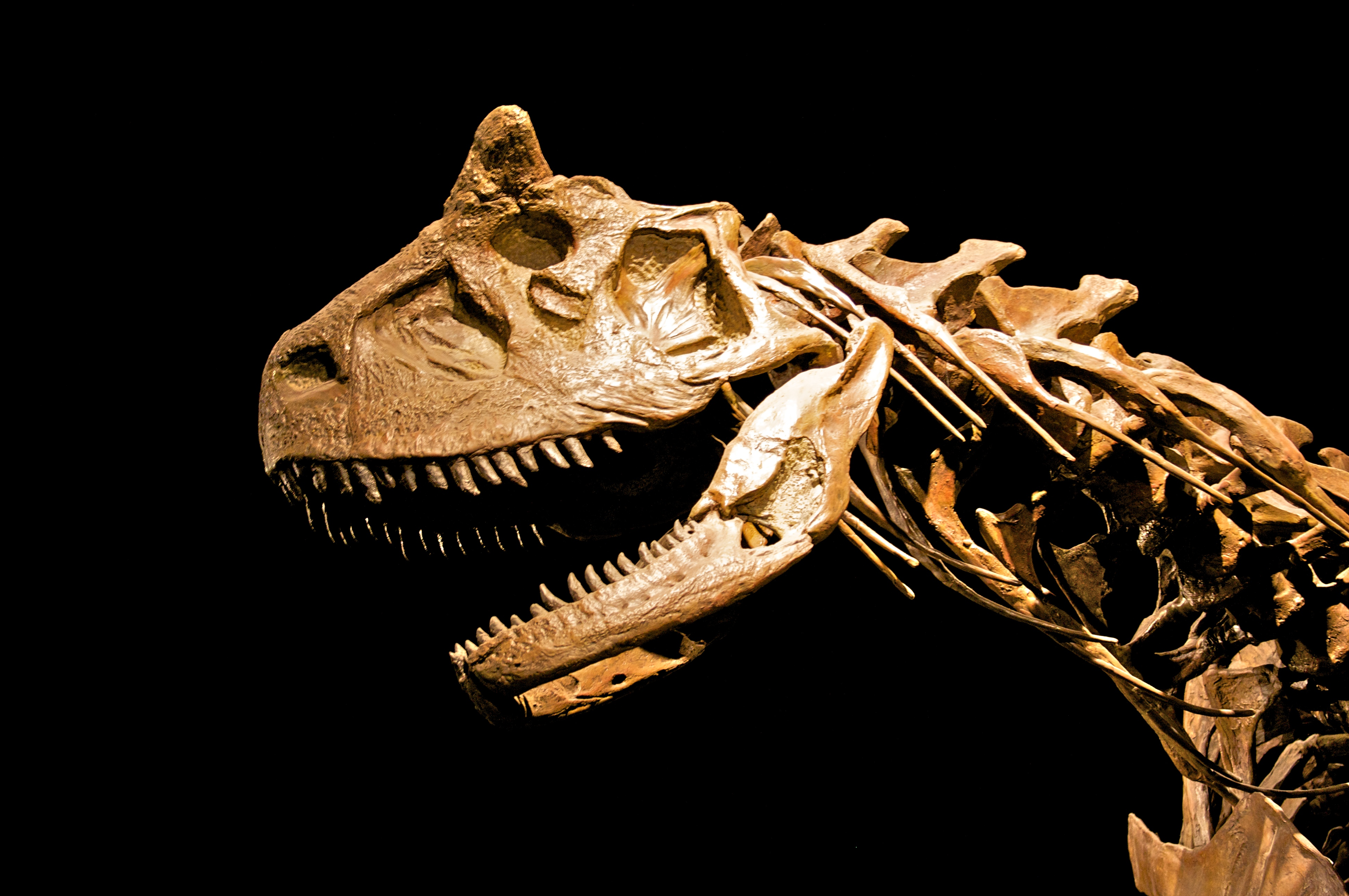
Skull and neck vertebrae of the abelisaurid theropod Carnotaurus with clearly visible epipophyses. In this genus, the epipophyses are greatly enlarged.

Epipophyses are bony projections of the cervical vertebrae found in archosauromorphs, particularly dinosaurs (including some basal birds). These paired processes sit above the postzygapophyses on the rear of the vertebral neural arch. Their morphology is variable and ranges from small, simple, hill-like elevations to large, complex, winglike projections. Epipophyses provided large attachment areas for several neck muscles; large epipophyses are therefore indicative of a strong neck musculature.

The presence of epipophyses is a synapomorphy (distinguishing feature) of the group Dinosauria. Epipophyses were present in the basal-most dinosaurs, but absent in the closest relatives of the group, such as Marasuchus and Silesaurus. They were typical for most dinosaur lineages; however, they became lost in several derived theropod lineages in the wake of an increasingly S-shaped curvature of the neck.

Several scientific papers have observed that epipophyses were present in various non-dinosaur archosauromorphs. These include several pseudosuchians (Batrachotomus, Revueltosaurus, Xilousuchus, Effigia, Hesperosuchus), basal avemetatarsalians (aphanosaurs) non-archosaur archosauriforms (Vancleavea, Halazhaisuchus), rhynchosaurs, several tanystropheids, and allokotosaurs. Sauropod-oriented paleontologist Mike Taylor has informally suggested that epipophyses were also present in the vertebrae of certain pterosaurs.
