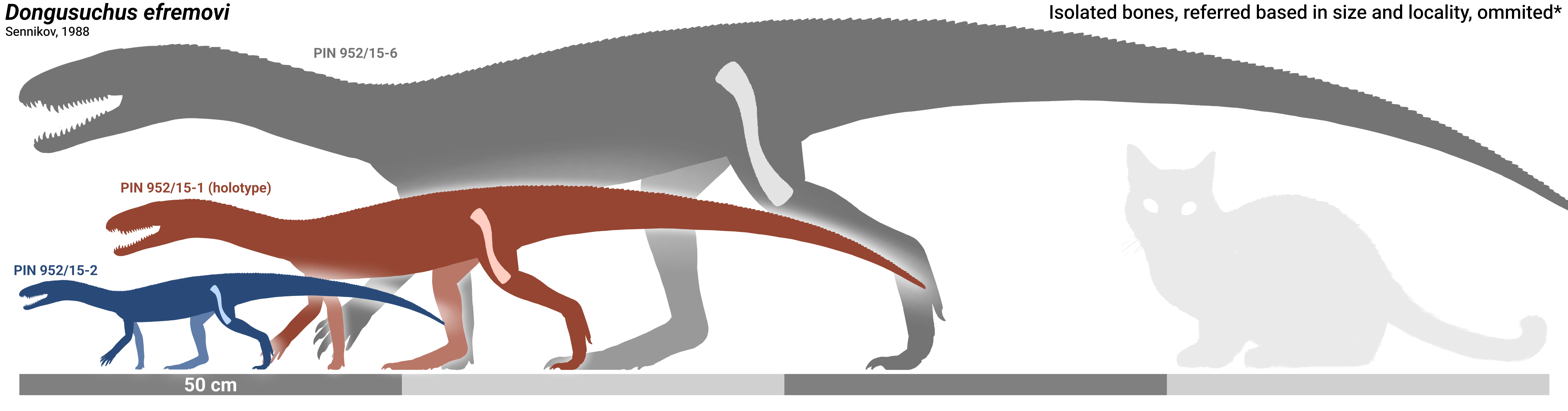
- Skeletal diagram of three specimens compared to a cat

Scientific classification
- Kingdom: Animalia
- Phylum: Chordata
- Class: Reptilia
- Clade: †Aphanosauria
- Genus: †Dongusuchus; Sennikov, 1988

Type species
- †Dongusuchus efremovi Sennikov, 1988

= Dongusuchus =

Dongusuchus Temporal range: Middle Triassic, Anisian

Extinct genus of reptiles

Dongusuchus (meaning Donguz River crocodile in Greek, for the area where the type specimen was found) is an extinct genus of archosaur from the Middle Triassic of Russia. It is currently regarded as an aphanosaur (an early-diverging relative of dinosaurs and pterosaurs).

The only confirmed fossils of Dongusuchus are femora (thigh bones) from the Donguz Formation, outcropping on the banks of the Donguz River in Orenburg Oblast. Other slender limb bones from the formation may belong to Dongusuchus as well, but this is only based on size and proximity. The Donguz Formation is also called the Eryosuchus Fauna, named after the capitosaurid amphibian Eryosuchus, the most common animal found there. It probably dates back to the Anisian or early Ladinian stages of the Middle Triassic.

== Classification ==
Sennikov (1988) and Gower and Sennikov (2000) suggested that Dongusuchus was a lightly-built rauisuchian (an early relative of crocodilians) with a long, sigmoidally curved (S-shaped) neck, unlike the more typical robust short-necked rauisuchians that appear later in the Triassic.

Nesbitt (2009) argued that Dongusuchus most likely represents a non-archosaurian archosauriform (a reptile related to both dinosaurs and crocodilians, but originating prior to their last common ancestor). According to Nesbitt (2009), two aspects of the femur suggest that it is not a member of Archosauria: a poorly defined crista tibiofibularis (a ridge at the back of the knee) and the lack of a distinct anteromedial tuber (a knob near the hip joint). Although Gower and Sennikov (2000) suggested that the distinct sigmoidal shape of Dongusuchus femur is unique, a similar shape is present in the femora of some phytosaurs. A paratype tibia (shin bone) was also found to be more similar to Euparkeria and phytosaurs, on the basis of its convex and rounded distal surface (ankle joint). Additionally, the proximal surface (upper end) of the tibia lacks a trait present in nearly all pseudosuchians, a depression on its lateral condyle (outer knob of the knee joint). Nesbitt assigned Dongusuchus to Archosauriformes on the basis of the following traits: its femur has a low fourth trochanter (a ridge connecting to tail muscles), and its distal condyles (knee joint knobs) do not expand markedly beyond the shaft. These traits suggest that Dongusuchus was an archosauriform more derived than Erythrosuchus.

Dongusuchus was also excluded from Archosauria by Niedźwiedzki et al. (2014) and a new large cladistic analysis of archosauromorphs by Ezcurra (2016) found Dongusuchus to be the sister taxon to the Indian Yarasuchus.

In contrast to previous studies, Nesbitt et al. (2017) regarded Dongusuchus as an archosaur closely related to Teleocrater, a new discovery from Tanzania. Dongusuchus, Teleocrater, Yarasuchus, and Spondylosoma all form a clade (natural grouping) known as Aphanosauria, which branches off at the base of the archosaur subgroup Avemetatarsalia. In other words, they would qualify as very early bird-line archosaurs, more closely related to pterosaurs and dinosaurs (including birds) rather than crocodilians.
