= Francis Rex Parrington =

British palaeontologist and anatomist

Francis Rex Parrington (20 February 1905 – 17 April 1981) was a British vertebrate palaeontologist and comparative anatomist at the University of Cambridge. A Fellow of the Royal Society, he was director of the Cambridge University Museum of Zoology and past president of the zoology section of the British Association for the Advancement of Science.

== Early life ==
Francis Rex Parrington was born on 20 February 1905 in Bromborough near Neston in Cheshire, he was the youngest of three children of brewery owner Frank Harding Parrington and his wife Bessie Harding. After the death of his father in 1907, his mother remarried and 'Rex' Parrington was brought up in Central Liverpool, where his stepfather was a general practitioner. His interest in natural history developed in childhood, and he collected wildflowers, beetles, and fossils. In 1920, his family moved to North Wales, where he could freely explore his interests in the natural world. He was educated at the Merchant Taylors' School in Crosby, and at Liverpool College. In 1924, he went up to Sidney Sussex College, Cambridge, where he studied Natural Sciences and was supervised by Clive Forster-Cooper, Director of the Cambridge University Museum of Zoology.

== Career ==
In 1927, Parrington became Assistant to the Director of the Cambridge University Museum of Zoology, where he was to work for over 43 years. During the 1930s, he was involved in a number of paleontological expeditions; to Ruhuhu and Tendaguru, Tanganyika Territory (modern Tanzania) to collect Middle Triassic fossils and to Scotland to collect specimens of Palaeozoic fishes at Achanarras. The African specimens collected by Parrington are scientifically significant, as they represent critical stages in vertebrate evolution, including diversification of Synapsids, the evolution of hearing in mammals and reptiles, and early archosaurs.

In 1938, Parrington became Lecturer in Zoology and was appointed Director of the Cambridge University Museum of Zoology. In 1958 he was awarded Doctor of Science at the University of Cambridge; in 1962 he was elected a Fellow of the Royal Society; in 1963 he was appointed Reader in Vertebrate Zoology. He was President of the Zoology Section of the British Association for the Advancement of Science, and in 1972 he was elected an Honorary (Life) Member of the Society of Vertebrate Paleontology.

Parrington died in Surrey on 17 April 1981, at the age of 76.

== Nyasasaurus parringtoni ==
During his expeditions to the Middle Triassic Manda Beds of Tanzania during the 1930s, Parrington discovered the earliest known dinosaur or dinosauriform reptile, dating to 243 million years ago, Nyasasaurus parringtoni. During the 1950s, Parrington supervised the doctoral thesis of Alan J. Charig, who was researching Triassic archosaurs of Tanganyika. Nyasasaurus parringtoni was published in 2012 by Sterling Nesbitt, a palaeontologist at the University of Washington in Seattle and his colleagues, and Charig was posthumously included as co-author.

== Bibliography ==
- Charig, A.J. (1990). "Francis Rex Parrington. 20 February 1905-17 April 1981". Biographical Memoirs of Fellows of the Royal Society. 36: 360–378. doi:10.1098/rsbm.1990.0036. JSTOR 770092.
