= Hyposphene-hypantrum articulation =

The hyposphene-hypantrum articulation is an accessory joint found in the vertebrae of several fossil reptiles of the group Archosauromorpha. It consists of a process on the backside of the vertebrae, the hyposphene, that fits in a depression in the front side of the next vertebrae, the hypantrum. Hyposphene-hypantrum articulations occur in the dorsal vertebrae and sometimes also in the posteriormost cervical and anteriormost caudal vertebrae.

In most tetrapods including the human, the vertebrae are connected with each other only via the centrum and the zygapophysis joints. Additional joints like the hyposphene-hypantrum articulations, which add rigidity to the vertebral column, are found in several different reptile lineages; a known example are the zygosphene-zygantrum articulations found in snakes.

Hyposphene-hypantrum articulations are found in several unrelated groups within the Archosauromorpha. They occur especially in large forms, for example in rauisuchids and in silesaurids and – within the Dinosauria – in saurischians. They evolved to make the vertebral column more rigid and stable and probably had supported the gigantism in sauropod dinosaurs.

Early Dinosauromorphs (early ancestors of dinosaurs) like Marasuchus, Lagosuchus and Euparkeria as well as ornithischian dinosaurs lack hyposphene-hypantrum articulations. Because these articulations are absent in both saurischian ancestors and all non-saurischian dinosaurs, they are considered a synapomorphy (a distinctive feature) of the Saurischia, as proposed by Gauthier (1986). Hyposphene-hypantrum articulations are found in all the basal members of the Saurischia. However, they became lost in several saurischian lineages. They were present in the derived and birdlike dromaeosaurid Rahonavis, but are lost in modern day's birds, probably due to their highly modified vertebrae. Within the Sauropodomorpha, they were present in prosauropods and most sauropods, but became independently lost in two cretaceous sauropod lineages, the Titanosauria and the Rebbachisauridae.

The hyposphene usually consists of a vertical ridge and is situated below the postzygapophysis, whereas the hypantrum is situated between the prezygapophysis. In sauropods, this joint is extremely variable.
