= Alan J. Charig =

British palaeontologist

- Born: 1 July 1927; England
- Died: 15 July 1997 (aged 70); England
- Scientific career
- Fields: Palaeontology

Alan Jack Charig (1 July 1927 – 15 July 1997) was an English palaeontologist and writer who popularised his subject on television and in books at the start of the wave of interest in dinosaurs in the 1970s.

Charig was, though, first and foremost a research scientist in the Department of Palaeontology at the Natural History Museum, London. There he worked on dinosaurs and their immediate Triassic ancestors, but also studied creatures as varied as limbless amphisbaenians (worm-lizards) and a Fijian gastropod, Thatcheria.

== Biography ==
Charig was educated at The Haberdashers' Aske's Boys' School, an independent school (at that time in Hampstead), and Emmanuel College, Cambridge. His university education was interrupted by National Service in the Royal Armoured Corps, first as a tank driver and, after volunteering for an Inter-Services Russian language course at Cambridge, as a Russian interpreter in Germany, from 1946 to 1948.

On graduating in Zoology in 1951, Charig took a doctorate at Cambridge, supervised by the late Francis Rex Parrington. His subject was Triassic archosaurs of Tanganyika.

After a short spell as lecturer in Zoology in the Gold Coast (now Ghana), in 1957 Charig took up a post in Invertebrate palaeontology at the Natural History Museum. He remained at the museum for the rest of his career, becoming Curator of Fossil Reptiles and Birds in 1961, and Principal Scientific Officer in 1964.

Life at the museum suited Charig well. He enjoyed meeting the public, especially children, and was an entertaining lecturer. He was known to write detailed letters in response to written questions and ideas from member of the public, again particularly children.

He wrote and presented a 10-part series on vertebrate palaeontology, Before the Ark (1973) on BBC television, and wrote the accompanying book. His second semi-popular book, A New Look at the Dinosaurs (1979), had an even greater impact and was translated into several languages.

Charig also planned exhibitions, notably in the museum's Fossil Mammal Gallery between 1970 and 1988. He retained his fluency in Russian from his Army days and gave classes in conversational Russian for his colleagues.

Despite long periods of poor health, Charig made many original scholarly contributions to dinosaur science, including an hypothesis to explain the unusual pelvic structure in plant-eating dinosaurs, which he referred to informally as "the femur-knocking-on-the-pubis problem".

In the mid-1980s, he found himself defending the museum's most famous fossil, the earliest known bird, Archaeopteryx, the authenticity of which was challenged by Sir Fred Hoyle. Charig responded with a characteristically robust refutation.

Charig loved travel; he climbed mountains in Peru and visited Timbuktu in a Morris Minor. He led museum expeditions to Zambia and Tanzania in 1963, to Lesotho in 1966 (discovering the oldest articulated fossil mammal skeleton in Early Jurassic rocks), and in 1978 to the Early Cretaceous of Queensland (turning up one of the earliest herrings).

A British Council scheme afforded a privileged visit to China, in 1979. It proved the forerunner of a joint field expedition to Sichuan in 1982 by the museum and the Institute of Vertebrate Palaeontology and Palaeoanthropology, Beijing.

A brick-pit near Ockley, in Surrey, England – provided Charig with one of the most notable research project of his career. He excavated Baryonyx walkeri, a fish-eating dinosaur from the Early Cretaceous Period.

After his retirement in 1987, Charig continued his research work at the Natural History Museum. At this period he also took up a two-month research fellowship awarded by the Japan Society for the Promotion of Science. In 1995, he went on an arduous tour of fossil sites throughout Argentina.

His final scientific publication, a monograph on the Surrey dinosaur Baryonyx, of which he was the senior author, was published at the end of June 1997. At the time of his death, two weeks later, Charig was working on several long-standing projects, notably the description of one of the earliest plant-eating dinosaurs, Scelidosaurus, from Dorset, England. A modern description of this genus only materialised in 2020.
