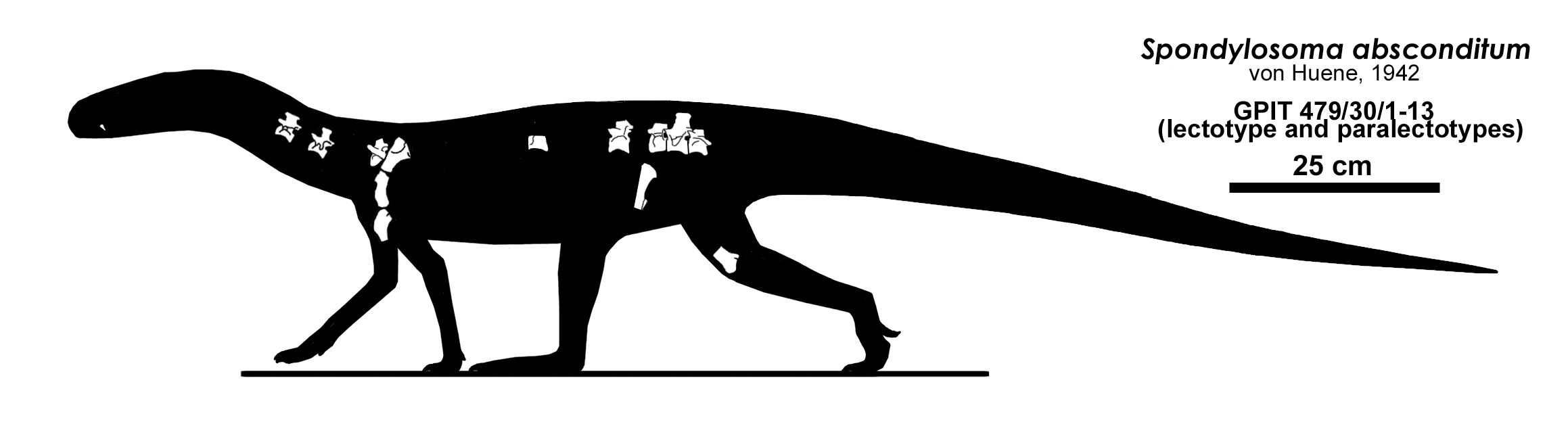
- Skeletal restoration showing known material, with a mostly hypothetical outline

Scientific classification
- Kingdom: Animalia
- Phylum: Chordata
- Class: Reptilia
- Clade: Archosauria
- Clade: Avemetatarsalia
- Clade: †Aphanosauria
- Genus: †Spondylosoma

Type species
- †Spondylosoma absconditum von Huene, 1942

= Spondylosoma =

Spondylosoma Temporal range: Middle Triassic, Ladinian

Extinct genus of reptiles

Spondylosoma (meaning "vertebra body") is a genus of avemetatarsalian archosaur, belonging to the clade Aphanosauria, from the Middle Triassic (late Ladinian age) Lower Santa Maria Formation in Paleorrota Geopark, Brazil.

== History ==
Friedrich von Huene based the genus on a fragmentary postcranial skeleton held at the University of Tübingen. This skeleton includes two teeth, two cervical vertebrae, four dorsal vertebrae, three sacral vertebrae, scapulae, part of a humerus, part of a femur, and part of a pubis. At the time, he thought it was a prosauropod.

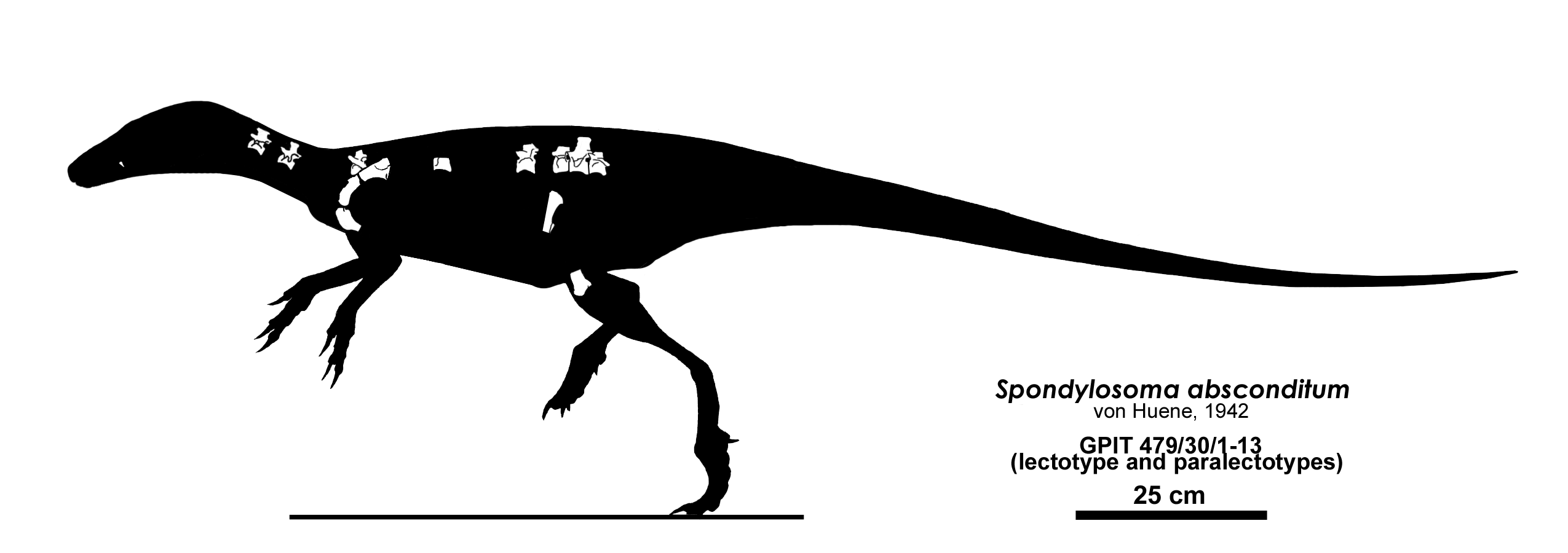
Known bones on a silhouette of a basal dinosaur, an outdated classification scheme

With the discovery of the basal dinosaur Staurikosaurus, Spondylosoma drew attention as a possible relative. Authors went back and forth on the question, considering it either as a basal dinosaur, or as a "thecodont" or other basal archosaur. In 2000, Peter Galton noted that it lacks dinosaurian characteristics and was probably a rauisuchian more closely related to rauisuchids, whereas in 2004 Max Langer disputed this and included Spondylosoma as a possible basal dinosaur similar to the herrerasaurs (but did not firmly rule out rauisuchian affinities). In his 2009 thesis on archosaur evolution, Sterling Nesbitt placed Spondylosoma at Archosauria incertae sedis, noting that the characters used by Galton to tentatively place the genus in Rauisuchidae are also found in Aetosauria, and that the holotype lacks characters to place it in either Pseudosuchia or Ornithodira.

The redescription of Teleocrater revealed numerous similarities between Spondylosoma and a few other Triassic taxa leading to their referral to a new clade of archosaurs, Aphanosauria, which is the sister to Ornithodira within Avemetatarsalia.
