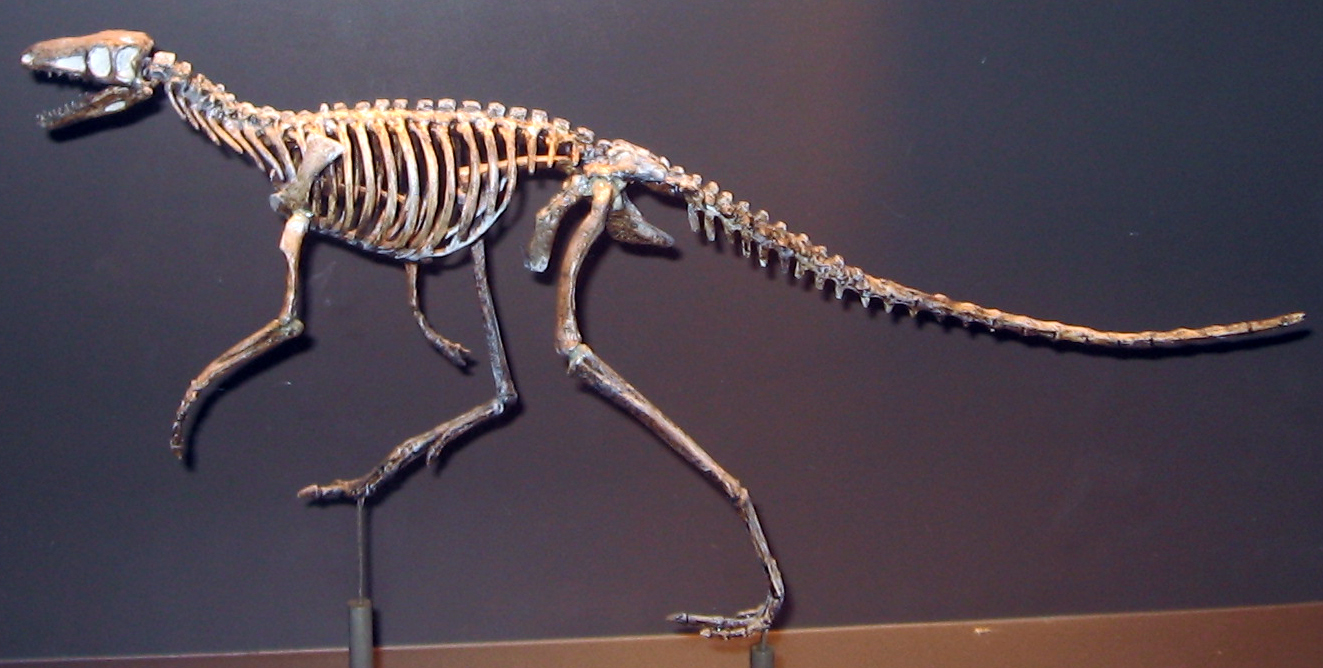
- Replica skeleton on display at the Sam Noble Museum in Norman, Oklahoma

Scientific classification
- Kingdom: Animalia
- Phylum: Chordata
- Class: Reptilia
- Clade: Dinosauriformes
- Genus: †Marasuchus; Sereno & Arcucci, 1994
- Species: †M. lilloensis

Binomial name
- †Marasuchus lilloensis (Romer, 1972 [originally Lagosuchus])

Synonyms
- Lagosuchus lilloensis Romer, 1972; Lagosuchus talampayensis? Romer, 1971

= Marasuchus =

Marasuchus Temporal range: Late Triassic (early Carnian), 236–234 Ma

Extinct genus of reptiles

Marasuchus (meaning "Mara crocodile") is an early genus of dinosauriform archosaur, one of the closest relatives of dinosaurs. It is sometimes regarded as a junior synonym of Lagosuchus (which would make Marasuchus an invalid later name for Lagosuchus fossils). Both names have been applied to small bipedal dinosauriform fossils from the same time and place: the Late Triassic (early Carnian stage) of what is now La Rioja Province, Argentina. If valid, Marasuchus contains a single species, Marasuchus lilloensis.

Marasuchus lilloensis was originally designated as Lagosuchus lilloensis in 1972. It was named for a few well-preserved dinosauriform fossils stored at PVL, a museum in San Miguel de Tucuman. L. lilloensis is the second named species of Lagosuchus, a contemporary archosaur described from a smaller and more fragmentary fossil the previous year. A 1994 study argued that the first species, Lagosuchus talampayensis, has insufficient fossil material to justify its continued use. In response, the same study gave the better-preserved PVL fossils a new genus: Marasuchus.

On the other hand, a 2019 study redescribed the original material of Lagosuchus and came to the opposite conclusion: that it was valid and not readily distinguishable from Marasuchus lilloensis. This suggests that Marasuchus lilloensis is a junior synonym of Lagosuchus talampayensis, since it was a later name applied to the same animal.

Marasuchus and Lagosuchus fossils possessed some, but not all of the adaptations which traditionally characterized dinosaurs. For example, its proportions indicate that it was probably bipedal (walking on only its hindlimbs), like early dinosaurs. Most of its specific dinosaur-like traits relate to the hip and the head of the femur (thigh bone). Nevertheless, it lacked certain dinosaur-like features such as a perforated acetabulum (open hip socket), and it had several plesiomorphic ("primitive") features of the ankle. Marasuchus was roughly the size of a pigeon, with an curved neck, long tail, and teeth consistent with a diet of mostly meat.

== Discovery and history ==
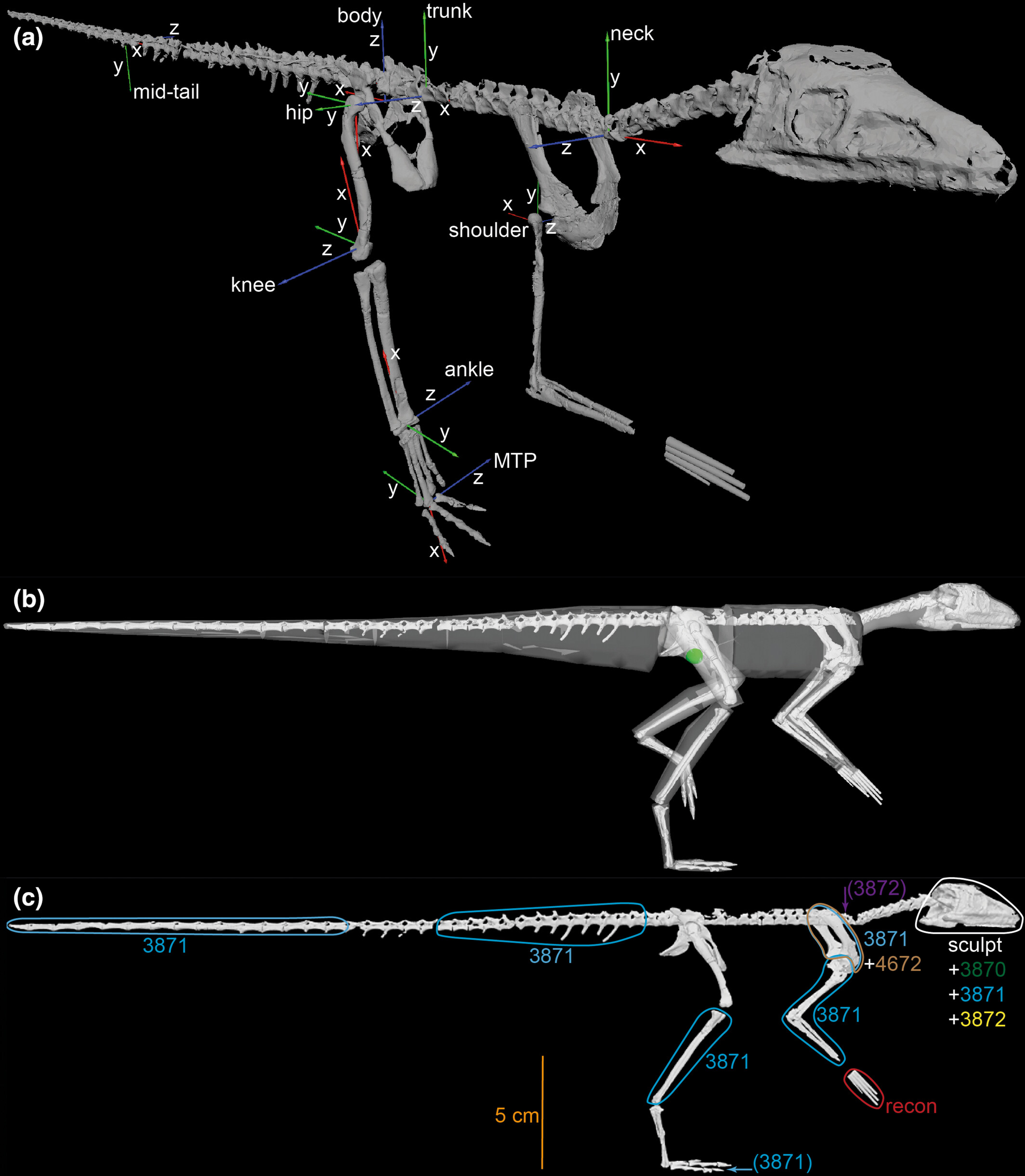
Biomechanical model of Lagosuchus, based on "Marasuchus" fossils stored at PVL (Tucuman)

Marasuchus hails from the Chañares Formation of Argentina. This formation has been dated to the early Carnian (the first stage of the Late Triassic), about 235 to 234 million years old. Many Chanares fossils, including the first known remains of Marasuchus, were unearthed as a result of a 1964-1965 paleontological expedition. This expedition was undertaken by paleontologists from the MCZ (Museum of Comparative Zoology at Harvard) and the MLP (Museo de La Plata in La Plata, Argentina). Discoveries made during the expedition were later described in a series of papers by Alfred Romer from the MCZ. Around the same time, further expeditions by Jose Bonaparte of the PVL (Paleontología de Vertebrados, Instituto 'Miguel Lillo' in San Miguel de Tucuman, Argentina) unearthed additional fossils from the area.

Marasuchus lilloensis is known from several specimens representing most of the animal's skeletal anatomy, although skull material remains limited and the hand is entirely unknown. The holotype, PVL 3871, was collected by Bonaparte in 1969. Romer (1971, 1972) referred to it as "the Tucuman specimen". This specimen consists of large portions of the tail, left forelimb, hip, hindlimbs, and possible snout fragments. The hip material of PVL 3871 has unusual anatomy compared to other specimens, and may actually be from an unrelated silesaurid. The shoulder blade may also be mixed in from a "sphenosuchian" crocodylomorph.

Other Marasuchus fossils are stored at the PVL as well. PVL 3870 includes skull material (a partial braincase and maxilla), the entire presacral vertebral column, part of the tail, and a nearly complete hip and hindlimbs. PVL 3872 is a braincase and associated cervical (neck) and dorsal (torso) vertebrae. PVL 4670 and 4671 each consist of vertebrae from the base of the tail, while PVL 4672 is a sequence of cervical and dorsal vertebrae. The referral of PVL 4670 to Marasuchus (or Lagosuchus) is uncertain due to the absence of diagnostic features clearly shared with other specimens. Relatively strongly-built forelimb bones also make up part of PVL 4670 and 4672, though they show some differences to the forelimb of PVL 3871.

=== Relation to Lagosuchus ===
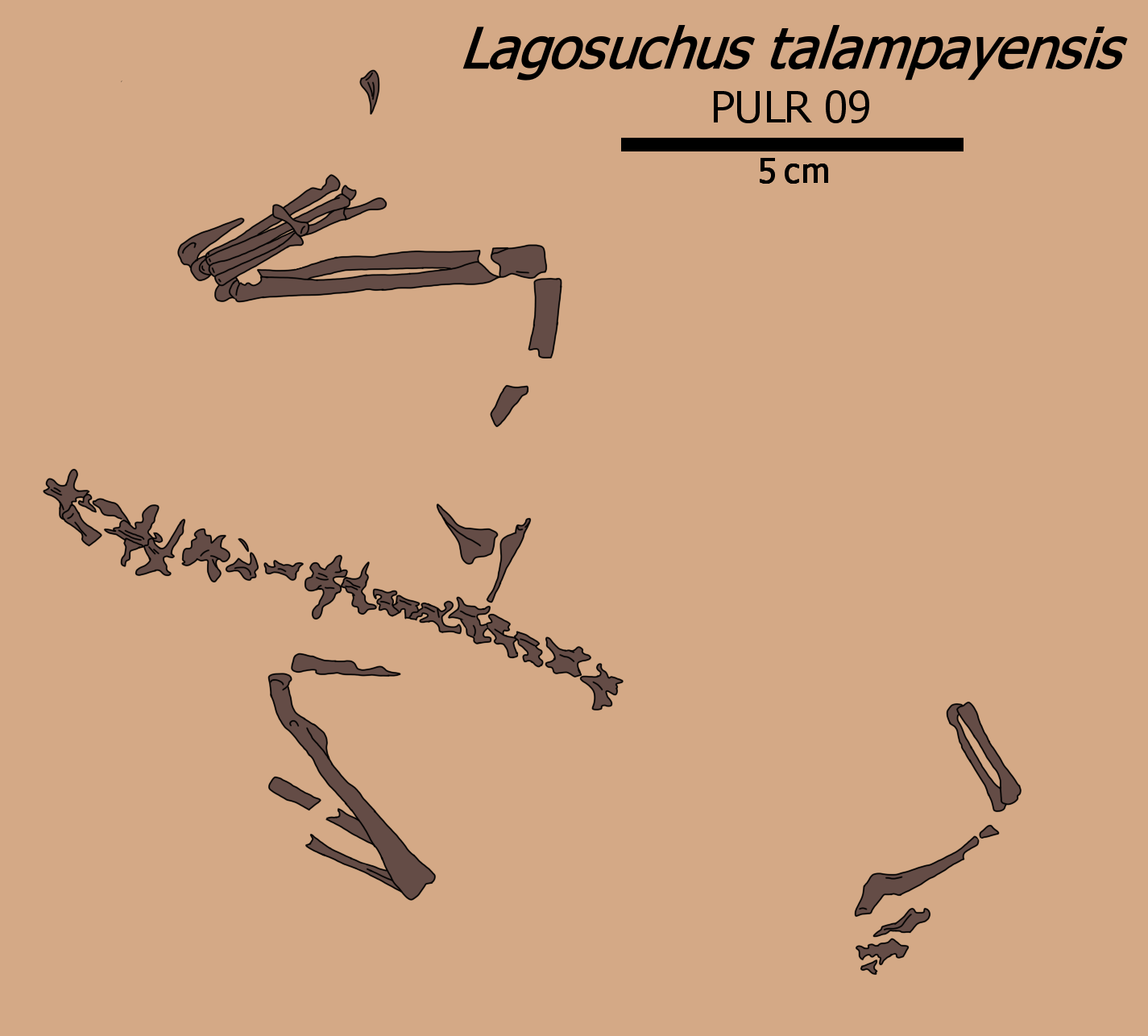
Diagram of the original Lagosuchus talampayensis fossil, stored at PULR (Universidad Nacional de La Rioja). Marasuchus was originally described as a species of Lagosuchus, and a 2019 paper revived their proposed synonymy.

When the Tucuman specimen was first described by Romer in 1972, it was placed as the type specimen of a new species, Lagosuchus lilloensis. Lagosuchus talampayensis, the type species of Lagosuchus, had been named a few papers earlier in 1971. The two species were differentiated mainly on the basis of the Tucuman specimen being larger than the type specimen of L. talampayensis. In his 1975 review of the genus, Jose Bonaparte regarded the two species as synonymous, with L. lilloensis as a junior synonym of L. talampayensis. Many other sources published between 1972 and 1994 followed this conclusion.

However, a later study by Paul Sereno and Andrea Arcucci (1994) concluded that the original type specimen of Lagosuchus was poorly preserved and undiagnostic. They argued against assigning other specimens to the genus Lagosuchus, which they regarded as a nomen dubium. They also noted that many referred PVL specimens had limb proportions and other subtle traits differing from Lagosuchus specimens stored elsewhere.

On this basis, Sereno and Arcucci named a new genus to contain the PVL specimens. Its new name was Marasuchus ("Mara crocodile"), a nod to the etymology of Lagosuchus ("Rabbit crocodile"). It was given the specific name Marasuchus lilloensis, based on Romer's species designation for the Tucuman specimen. Between 1994 and 2019, Marasuchus was considered a more diagnostic and better-described replacement name for dinosauriform fossils previously regarded as Lagosuchus.

In 2019, the type specimen of Lagosuchus at Universidad Nacional de La Rioja was re-examined by Federico Agnolin and Martin Ezcurra. They noted that the type specimen actually does share several of the diagnostic traits identified by Sereno and Arucci for Marasuchus. Furthermore, they argued that variations in size and certain features of the skeleton were either ontogenetic (based on different ages) or individually variable within a species. As a result, they referred the PVL specimens back to Lagosuchus. Following their conclusion, Marasuchus lilloensis could be considered a synonym of Lagosuchus talampayensis once more. Otero et al. (2024), in an effort to model the evolution of archosaur biomechanics, also regarded the two species as the same animal, with Lagosuchus talampayensis taking priority. They also reevaluated whether all of the PVL specimens belong to dinosauriforms, since there has been some confusion regarding some fossils from different species labeled with the same number.

== Description ==
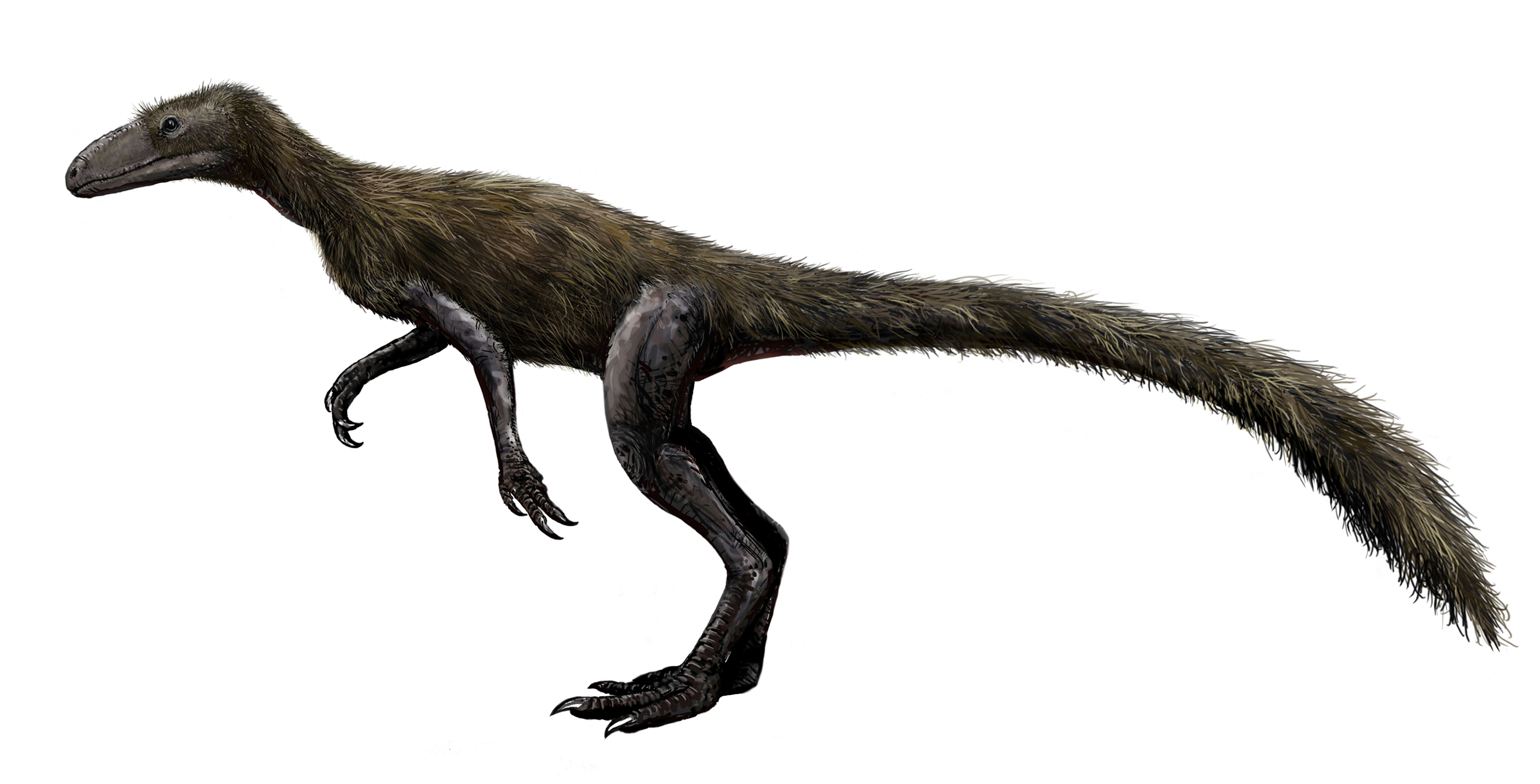
Life restoration of M. lilloensis with feather-like filaments

In terms of proportions, Marasuchus generally resembled early theropod dinosaurs like Coelophysis. The limbs were long and slender, with the hindlimbs about twice the length of the forelimbs. These proportions meant that it was probably bipedal and had acquired the upright stance characteristic of dinosaurs. The neck was relatively long for an archosaur, with an S-shaped curve as its default position, while the tail was very long and thin, though deeper at its base. The type specimen of Marasuchus (PVL 3871) had a femur which was 5.75 cm (2.26) inches in length, about 40-50% larger than the type specimen of Lagosuchus talampayensis. Nevertheless, Marasuchus was still a small and lightly built animal.

=== Skull ===
Skull material is very limited for Marasuchus, with the only preserved bones from this region being a maxilla (a toothed bone at the side of the snout) preserved in PVL 3870 and braincases preserved in PVL 3870 and 3872. The maxilla was low, with at least 12 teeth. Most of these teeth were blade-like and serrated, but some of those near the rear of the bone were less curved and more leaf-shaped. The maxilla also possessed interdental plates on its inner surface.

The braincase was tall and fairly typical compared to other early archosaurs. However, in a few cases it shared specific similarities with the braincase of early dinosaurs. For example, the basipterygoid processes (a pair of plates at the bottom of the braincase which connect to the roof of the mouth) were short, blade-like, and tilted forwards. In addition, the exoccipitals (a pair of braincase bones adjacent to the foramen magnum, the main exit for the spinal cord) were wide and edged by a pronounced ridge next to the exit holes for the hypoglossal nerve. Bonaparte (1975) additionally described squamosal and quadrate bones similar to those of Euparkeria attached to PVL 3872's braincase, and Otero et al. (2024) supported this finding.

=== Vertebrae ===
Almost the entirety of the spinal column is present in Marasuchus, barring the tip of the tail. Most of Marasuchus' diagnostic features (i.e. unique or unusual traits which characterize it specifically) occur in its vertebrae. Most of the neck vertebrae were elongated and had offset front and rear ends, creating a long and curved neck like that of other avemetatarsalians (bird-lineage archosaurs). Also like avemetatarsalians, the upward projecting neural spine of the axis vertebra was expanded and trapezoidal rather than peak-like. More uniquely, the neural spines of vertebrae closer to the base of the neck leaned forwards. Vertebrae near the hip were also characteristic to Marasuchus, since their neural spines were also trapezoidal and expanded to such an extent that they contacted those of adjacent vertebrae. Two vertebrae attach to the hip, less than in most dinosaurs which typically acquire three or more in the sacrum. The tail was characteristically elongated, with vertebrae drastically increasing in length towards the tip. The chevrons (spine-like bones projecting under the tail vertebrae) were also elongated in tail vertebrae near the hip, making the tail unusually deep at its base as well.

=== Forelimbs ===
The scapulocoracoid (shoulder blade) was quite large and broad unlike most other avemetatarsalians. On the other hand, the glenoid (shoulder socket) was directed somewhat backwards (rather than sideways), as is the case with other dinosauriforms. The forelimb bones (consisting of a humerus, ulna, and radius) were very slender and shorter than the leg bones, and the forelimb as a whole was about half the size of the hindlimb. No portion of the hand is preserved.

=== Hip ===
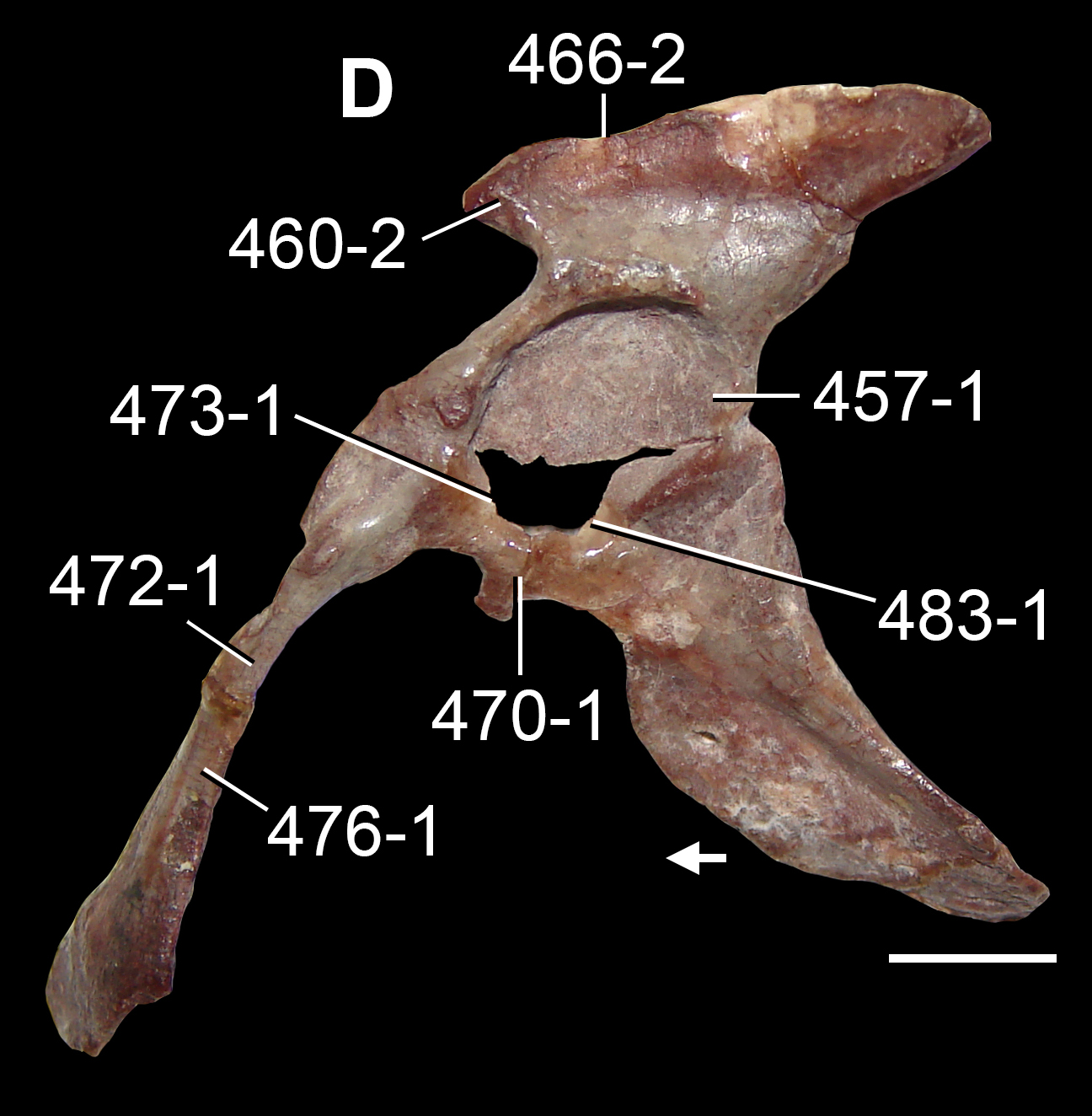
The (mirrored) right pelvis of specimen PVL 3870

The pelvis (hip) shared quite a few similarities with other dinosauriforms not otherwise present in earlier archosauriforms. The ilium (upper blade of the hip) was similar to that of Herrerasaurus in general shape. The pubis (front lower blade of the hip) was longer than the ischium (rear lower blade of the hip), like dinosauriforms. However, the ischium was also enlarged relative to earlier archosauriforms, as it was longer than the main portion of the ilium. Furthermore, the ischium's contact with the pubis is less extensive than in early archosauriforms and it fails to contact the ilium along the boundary of the pubis, as with silesaurids and saurischian dinosaurs. This "gap" between the ilium and ischium along the edge of the pubis becomes more developed in dinosaurs, where it becomes and open cavity that fills up the entire acetabulum (hip socket). However, this had not yet evolved in Marasuchus, which retains a bony inner wall of the acetablum. Moreover, the edge of the ischium in Marasuchus retains contact between the ilium and pubis, unlike dinosaurs. Nevertheless, a depression present in that area may be a predecessor to the more advanced condition in dinosaurs.

=== Hindlimbs ===
Modifications to the acetabulum are mirrored in the head of the femur (thigh bone), which connects to it. A distinct tab of bone known as an anterior trochanter was present on the outer edge of the femoral head, as with other dinosauriforms and to a lesser extent in other avemetatarsalians. In addition, Marasuchus also possessed a ridge of bone known as the trochanteric shelf, which branches down from the anterior trochanter and wraps around the shaft of the femur. A trochanteric shelf is also characteristic of some early dinosaurs, silesaurids, and some specimens of Dromomeron, and a similar structure is also present in aphanosaurs, albeit separate from their equivalent of the anterior trochanter. As with other dinosauriforms, the tibia (shin bone) has a longitudinal groove edged by a sharp flange at its rear outer corner, near the ankle. The tibia was also longer than the femur.

The ankle had two main bones: the larger, boxy astragalus and a smaller calcaneum attached to its outer edge. In some aspects, the ankle shared features with other dinosauriforms, such as a vertical triangular branch of the astragalus (known as an ascending process) which rises up in front of the tibia. However, in other aspects the ankle was surprisingly primitive, even compared to earlier avemetatarsalians like pterosaurs and lagerpetids. For example, the rear of the astragalus possesses a vertical groove, and the calcaneum had a knob on its rear edge known as a calcaneal tuber. Unlike lagerpetids or coelophysoids, the astragalus and calcaneum were not fused together. The five metatarsals (foot bones) were thin, elongated, and close together. The third and fourth metatarsals were the longest, followed by the second, with the first and fifth being only about half the length of the longest. Although not all of the pedal phalanges (toe bones) were preserved, the phalangeal formula (number of bones per toe) was likely 2-3-4-5-0 as with other dinosauromorphs.

== Classification ==
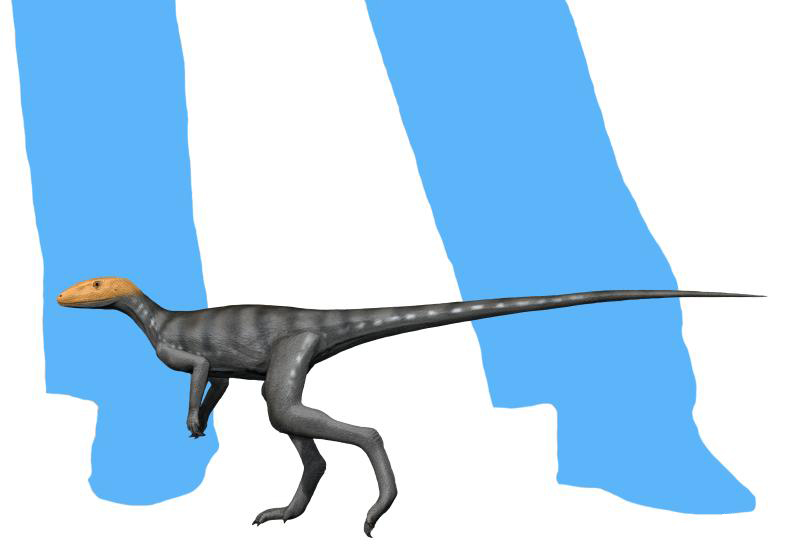
Life restoration (without feather-like filaments) compared to human legs.

Marasuchus was part of Avemetatarsalia, the branch of archosaurs closer to birds and other dinosaurs rather than to crocodilians. More specifically, it was a dinosauriform, meaning that it was closer to dinosaurs than the lagerpetids. Although it was not as close as silesaurids such as Silesaurus, Marasuchus is still one of the most completely known avemetatarsalians, assisting knowledge of the early evolution of dinosaur-like characteristics. The following is a cladogram of basal Dinosauriformes according to Nesbitt (2011), and Dinosauria according to Baron et al. (2017):

- - Dinosauromorpha
    - †Lagerpetonidae
    - Dinosauriformes
      - †Marasuchus
      - - †Silesauridae
        - Dinosauria
          - Saurischia
            - †Herrerasauridae
            - †Sauropodomorpha
          - Ornithoscelida
            - †Ornithischia
            - Theropoda
