= 2017 in reptile paleontology =

Paleontology or palaeontology is the study of prehistoric life forms on Earth through the examination of plant and animal fossils. This includes the study of body fossils, tracks (ichnites), burrows, cast-off parts, fossilised feces (coprolites), palynomorphs and chemical residues. Because humans have encountered fossils for millennia, paleontology has a long history both before and after becoming formalized as a science. This article records significant discoveries and events related to paleontology that occurred or were published in the year 2017.

== Lepidosaurs ==
=== Rhynchocephalians ===
==== Research ====
- A study on the morphological diversity and rates of morphological evolution of extinct and extant rhynchocephalians is published by Herrera-Flores, Stubbs and Benton (2017); the study is subsequently criticized by Vaux et al. (2019).
- A study on the bone histology and growth of the Jurassic pleurosaurid Palaeopleurosaurus is published by Klein and Scheyer (2017).
- Jaws of Clevosaurus brasiliensis affected by osteomyelitis are described from the Late Triassic (Norian) Candelária Sequence of the Santa Maria Supersequence (Brazil) by Romo-de-Vivar-Martínez et al. (2017).

==== New taxa ====
Name	Novelty	Status	Authors	Age	Unit	Location	Notes	Images
Deltadectes	Gen. et sp. nov	Valid	Whiteside, Duffin & Furrer	Late Triassic		Switzerland	A basal member of Rhynchocephalia. The type species is D. elvetica.	
Gephyrosaurus evansae	Sp. nov	Valid	Whiteside & Duffin	Late Triassic (Rhaetian)		United Kingdom		
Penegephyrosaurus	Gen. et sp. nov	Valid	Whiteside & Duffin	Late Triassic (Rhaetian)		United Kingdom	A member of the family Gephyrosauridae. The type species is P. curtiscoppi.	
Vadasaurus	Gen. et sp. nov		Bever & Norell	Late Jurassic (Kimmeridgian)	Solnhofen Limestone	Germany	A relative of pleurosaurids. The type species is V. herzogi.	

=== Lizards and snakes ===
==== Research ====
- A study comparing inner ear morphology of Dinilysia patagonica and extant lizards and snakes is published by Palci et al. (2017).
- An overview of the discoveries of Mesozoic lizards from Brazil is published by Simões et al. (2017).
- A study on the origins of the Australian fauna of lizards and snakes is published by Oliver & Hugall (2017).
- A study on the nomenclature and phylogenetic relationships of the lizard species assigned to the genus Necrosaurus is published by Georgalis (2017), who assigns the species Necrosaurus cayluxi and Melanosauroides giganteus to the genus Palaeovaranus and names a new family Palaeovaranidae.
- A study on the anatomy and phylogenetic relationships of Eichstaettisaurus schroederi and Ardeosaurus digitatellus is published by Simões et al. (2017).
- A redescription of the anatomy of the holotype specimen of the teiid species Callopistes bicuspidatus from the late Miocene–early Pliocene of Argentina is published by Brizuela & Albino (2017).
- An almost complete skull and a few associated postcranial bones of the lacertid Dracaenosaurus croizeti are described from the Oligocene locality of Cournon (south-central France) by Čerňanský et al. (2017).
- A description of the anatomy of the postcranial skeleton of the putative stem-amphisbaenian Slavoia darevskii and a study on its implications for the evolution of the postcranial skeleton of amphisbaenians is published by Tałanda (2017).
- Description of a new specimen of Geiseltaliellus maarius from the Eocene Messel pit (Germany), preserving details of the squamation, is published by Smith (2017).
- A study testing whether extant anole species adapted to similar ecological niches have similar semicircular canal morphologies, as well as a reconstruction of the vestibular system in five Miocene anoles from the Dominican Republic and a study on their ecology is published by Dickson et al. (2017).
- An autotomized tail of a shinisaurid is described from the Eocene Messel pit (Germany) by Smith (2017).
- Fossils of a monitor lizard are described from the middle Pleistocene of Greece by Georgalis, Villa & Delfino (2017), representing the most recent known record of the family Varanidae from Europe.
- A study on the phylogenetic relationships of members of Mosasauroidea is published by Simões et al. (2017).
- A study on the robustness of the hypotheses about mosasauroid phylogenetic relationships and a reevaluation of the dataset from the study of Simões et al. (2017) is published by Madzia & Cau (2017).
- A revision of mosasauroids from the Upper Cretaceous marine sediments associated with Gondwanan landmasses is published by Jiménez-Huidobro, Simões & Caldwell (2017).
- A redescription of Mosasaurus hoffmannii based on examination of many specimens is published by Street & Caldwell (2017), who also provide emended diagnoses for both the genus Mosasaurus and its type species M. hoffmannii.
- A study on the presence of ligamentous tooth attachment in mosasaurs and in fossil and modern snakes is published by LeBlanc, Lamoureux & Caldwell (2017).
- A pachyostotic marine squamate specimen belonging to the family Pachyophiidae, consisting of 29 vertebrae, is described from the Upper Cretaceous (Turonian) of Bosnia and Herzegovina by Đurić et al. (2017).
- An overview of the snake fossil record from Brazil is published by Onary, Fachini & Hsiou (2017).
- A redescription of the type material of Gigantophis garstini, a reevaluation of referred material from North Africa and Pakistan, and a study on the phylogenetic relationships of Gigantophis and other madtsoiids is published by Rio & Mannion (2017).
- Snake fossils, including the first record of an indigenous member of the genus Pantherophis in West Indies and the first reported member of the genus Nerodia in the fossil record of West Indies, are described from the late Pleistocene of the Bahamas by Mead & Steadman (2017).
- A large viperine snake assigned to the genus Macrovipera is reported from the early Vallesian of Romania by Codrea et al. (2017), representing the first occurrence of this genus in the late Miocene of eastern Romania.

==== New taxa ====
Name	Novelty	Status	Authors	Age	Unit	Location	Notes	Images
Gaimanophis powelli	Sp. nov	Valid	Albino	Late Miocene	India Muerta Formation	Argentina	A boa.	
Kaikaifilu	Gen. et sp. nov	Valid	Otero et al.	Late Cretaceous (late Maastrichtian)	López de Bertodano Formation	Antarctica	A mosasaur. The type species is K. hervei.	
Magnuviator	Gen. et sp. nov	Valid	DeMar et al.	Late Cretaceous (Campanian)	Two Medicine Formation	United States (Montana)	A member of Iguanomorpha (the group containing crown and stem-iguanians) related to Saichangurvel davidsoni and Temujinia ellisoni. The type species is M. ovimonsensis.	
Norisophis	Gen. et sp. nov	Valid	Klein et al.	Cretaceous	Kem Kem Beds	Morocco	A stem-snake. The type species is N. begaa.	
Oardasaurus	Gen. et sp. nov	Valid	Codrea, Venczel & Solomon	Late Cretaceous (Maastrichtian)		Romania	A member of Teiioidea, possibly a relative of Barbatteius vremiri. Genus includes new species O. glyphis.	
Pholidoscelis turukaeraensis	Sp. nov	Valid	Bochaton et al.	Late Pleistocene and Holocene		France (Marie-Galante Island)	A member of Teiidae.	
Schoenesmahl	Gen. et sp. nov	Valid	Conrad	Late Jurassic (Tithonian)	Solnhofen Limestone	Germany	A relative of Ardeosaurus found in the abdominal cavity of the holotype specimen of Compsognathus longipes. The type species is S. dyspepsia.	
Stefanikia	Gen. et sp. nov	Valid	Čerňanský & Smith	Eocene	Messel pit	Germany	A lizard related to Eolacerta and the wall lizards. The type species is S. siderea.	
Varanus mokrensis	Sp. nov	Valid	Ivanov et al.	Early Miocene		Czech Republic	A monitor lizard.	
Yabeinosaurus bicuspidens	Sp. nov	Valid	Dong, Wang & Evans	Early Cretaceous	Yixian Formation	China		
Yabeinosaurus robustus	Sp. nov	Valid	Dong, Wang & Evans	Early Cretaceous		China		
Zilantophis	Gen. et sp. nov	Valid	Jasinski & Moscato	Late Hemphillian	Gray Fossil Site	United States (Tennessee)	A colubrid snake. Genus includes new species Z. schuberti.	

== Ichthyosauromorphs ==
=== Research ===
- A study on the emergence date and changes of the evolutionary rate during the ichthyosauromorph evolution is published by Motani et al. (2017).
- A jaw fragment of a member of the genus Omphalosaurus is described from the Middle Triassic (Anisian) Karchowice Formation (Poland) by Wintrich, Hagdorn & Sander (2017), representing the first record of Omphalosaurus from shallow marine carbonates and from the Muschelkalk facies.
- Description of three nearly complete and well-preserved skulls of Chaohusaurus chaoxianensis, revealing new information on the skull anatomy of the species, is published by Zhou et al. (2017).
- A specimen of Ichthyosaurus somersetensis containing an embryo, representing the largest unequivocal specimen of a member of the genus Ichthyosaurus, is described from the Lower Jurassic (lower Hettangian) Blue Lias Formation (United Kingdom) by Lomax & Sachs (2017).
- Plet et al. (2017) report the presence of red and white blood cell-like structures as well as platelet-like structures, collagen and cholesterol in a vertebra of a member of the genus Stenopterygius from Toarcian Posidonia Shale (Germany).
- An articulated skeleton of an ophthalmosaurid ichthyosaur is described from the Upper Jurassic (Kimmeridgian) Katrol Formation (India) by Prasad et al. (2017).

=== New taxa ===
Name	Novelty	Status	Authors	Age	Unit	Location	Notes	Images
Gengasaurus	Gen. et sp. nov	Valid	Paparella et al.	Late Jurassic		Italy	A member of Ophthalmosauridae. The type species is G. nicosiai.	
Keilhauia	Gen. et sp. nov	Disputed	Delsett et al.	Early Cretaceous (early Berriasian)	Agardhfjellet Formation	Norway	A member of Ophthalmosauridae. The type species is K. nui. Zverkov & Prilepskaya (2019) considered Keilhauia to be a junior synonym of the genus Arthropterygius, and considered K. nui to be nomen dubium; Delsett et al. (2019) rejected this synonymy.	
Protoichthyosaurus applebyi	Sp. nov	Valid	Lomax, Massare & Mistry	Early Jurassic (Hettangian)		United Kingdom		

== Sauropterygians ==
=== Research ===
- A study on the mechanisms generating vertebral counts and their regionalisation during embryo development that were responsible for high plasticity of the body plan of sauropterygians is published by Soul & Benson (2017).
- A study on the evolution of the anatomy of the inner ear of sauropterygians is published by Neenan et al. (2017).
- A study on the morphology of the occlusal surface of placodont teeth and its implications for the diet of the placodonts is published by Crofts et al. (2017).
- New specimen of Dianmeisaurus gracilis is described from the Middle Triassic Guanling Formation (China) by Shang, Li & Wu (2017).
- Fossilized soft tissues preserved with skeletal remains of Middle Triassic nothosaurs from Poland are described by Surmik, Rothschild & Pawlicki (2017).
- Description of a new specimen of Lariosaurus xingyiensis from the Middle Triassic Falang Formation (China) and a phylogenetic analysis of the family Nothosauridae is published by Lin et al. (2017), who transfer the species "Nothosaurus" juvenilis, "N." youngi and "N." winkelhorsti to the genus Lariosaurus.
- Evidence of septic necrosis and decompression syndrome-associated avascular necrosis affecting bones of Pistosaurus longaevus is reported by Surmik et al. (2017).
- A study on the skeletal anatomy of Bobosaurus forojuliensis is published by Dalla Vecchia (2017).
- A study on the function of the long neck in plesiosaurs as indicated by the anatomy of the neck is published by Noè, Taylor & Gómez-Pérez (2017).
- A study on the large, paired openings in the neck vertebrae of plesiosaurs and their implications for inferring the anatomy of the vascular system in the neck of plesiosaurs is published by Wintrich, Scaal & Sander (2017).
- A study on the swimming method of plesiosaurs is published by Muscutt et al. (2017).
- An assessment of the completeness of the plesiosaur fossil record is published by Tutin & Butler (2017).
- A description of a new specimen of Colymbosaurus svalbardensis from the Tithonian–Berriasian Agardhfjellet Formation (Svalbard, Norway), a reevaluation of the diagnostic features of the species and a study on its phylogenetic relationships is published by Roberts et al. (2017).
- A study on the tooth formation cycle in elasmosaurid plesiosaurs is published by Kear et al. (2017).
- A redescription of the holotype specimen of Tuarangisaurus keyesi and a study on the phylogenetic relationships of the species is published by O'Gorman et al. (2017).
- A study on the anatomy of the vertebra of Vegasaurus molyi and its implications for the anatomy of the nervous system of the species is published by O'Gorman & Fernandez (2017).
- A study on the skeletal morphology and histology of a perinatal aristonectine plesiosaur specimen recovered from the López de Bertodano Formation (Seymour Island, Antarctica) is published by O'Gorman, Talevi & Fernández (2017).
- A redescription of the anatomy of the holotype skull of Morturneria seymourensis is published by O'Keefe et al. (2017).
- A reappraisal and a study on the phylogenetic relationships of Mauisaurus is published by Hiller et al. (2017).
- Libonectes atlasense is redescribed by Sachs & Kear (2017), who consider this species to be likely synonymous with Libonectes morgani.
- An elasmosaurid specimen closely related to Vegasaurus molyi, Kawanectes lafquenianum, Morenosaurus stocki and aristonectines is described from the Late Cretaceous (late Maastrichtian) López de Bertodano Formation (Antarctica) by O'Gorman & Coria (2017), who name a new elasmosaurid clade Weddellonectia.

=== New taxa ===
Name	Novelty	Status	Authors	Age	Unit	Location	Notes	Images
Acostasaurus	Gen. et sp. nov	Valid	Gómez-Pérez & Noè	Early Cretaceous (Barremian)	Paja Formation	Colombia	A member of the family Pliosauridae. Genus includes new species A. pavachoquensis.	
Hispaniasaurus	Gen. et sp. nov	Valid	Marquez-Aliaga et al.	Middle Triassic (Ladinian)	Cañete Formation	Spain	A marine reptile with nothosauroid affinities. The type species is H. cranioelongatus.	
Lagenanectes	Gen. et sp. nov	Valid	Sachs, Hornung & Kear	Early Cretaceous (probably late Hauterivian)		Germany	A member of Elasmosauridae. The type species is L. richterae.	
Luskhan	Gen. et sp. nov	Valid	Fischer et al.	Early Cretaceous		Russia	A member of Pliosauridae. The type species is L. itilensis.	
Mauriciosaurus	Gen. et sp. nov	Valid	Frey et al.	Late Cretaceous	Aguas Nuevas Formation	Mexico	A member of Polycotylidae. The type species is M. fernandezi.	
Nakonanectes	Gen. et sp. nov	Valid	Serratos, Druckenmiller & Benson	Late Cretaceous (early Maastrichtian)	Bearpaw Shale	United States (Montana)	A member of Elasmosauridae. The type species is N. bradti.	
Rhaeticosaurus	Gen. et sp. nov		Wintrich et al.	Late Triassic (Rhaetian)	Exter Formation	Germany	An early plesiosaur, possibly a basal member of Pliosauridae. The type species is R. mertensi.	
Thaumatodracon	Gen. et sp. nov	Valid	Smith & Araújo	Early Jurassic (Sinemurian)		United Kingdom	A member of the family Rhomaleosauridae. The type species is T. wiedenrothi.	

== Turtles ==
=== Research ===
- A study on the evolution of the turtle vertebral column as indicated by the anatomy of the Late Triassic turtles and a phylogenetic analysis (which also tests the suggested relationship of Eunotosaurus africanus and Pappochelys rosinae to turtles) is published by Szczygielski (2017).
- A study on the evolution of turtle neck anatomy based on data from fossil and extant taxa is published by Böhmer & Werneburg (2017).
- A study on the morphological diversity of the skulls of the fossil turtles through time is published by Foth, Ascarrunz & Joyce (2017).
- A review of the basalmost known members of Testudinata is published by Joyce (2017), who defines new clades Mesochelydia (the clade that arises from the most recent common ancestor of Condorchelys antiqua, Eileanchelys waldmani, Heckerochelys romani and Kayentachelys aprix) and Perichelydia (the clade that arises from the most recent common ancestor of Meiolania platyceps, Helochelydra nopcsai, Sichuanchelys chowi and Testudo graeca).
- A method of inferring habitats of extinct turtles based on measurements of the shell is proposed by Lichtig & Lucas (2017).
- Meiolaniid fossils are described from the Eocene Rundle Formation (eastern Queensland, Australia) by Poropat et al. (2017), representing the oldest meiolaniid remains found in Australasia to date.
- Reconstructions of the morphology of the brain, inner ear and nasal cavities in the meiolaniids Niolamia argentina, Gaffneylania auricularis and Meiolania platyceps are presented by Paulina-Carabajal et al. (2017).
- New fossil material of Jiangxichelys ganzhouensis is described by Tong et al. (2017), who also transfer the species "Zangerlia" neimongolensis to the genus Jiangxichelys.
- A juvenile specimen of Manchurochelys manchoukuoensis is described from the Early Cretaceous Yixian Formation (China) by Shao et al. (2017).
- A redescription of Ctenochelys acris based on several specimens from the Late Cretaceous (early Campanian) Mooreville Chalk of Alabama (United States) is published by Gentry (2017).
- Description of a new specimen of Camerochelys vilanovai from the Early Cretaceous of Spain and a study on the phylogenetic relationships of the species is published by Pérez-García, Sáez-Benito & Murelaga (2017).
- Description of new specimens of the baenid species Baena arenosa and Chisternon undatum from the Eocene Uinta Formation (Utah, United States) is published by Smith et al. (2017).
- A revision of the Late Jurassic turtle taxa traditionally assigned to the families Eurysternidae, Plesiochelyidae and Thalassemydidae is published by Anquetin, Püntener & Joyce (2017), who hypothesize that these taxa form a monophyletic group named Thalassochelydia.
- A description of the skull morphology of Anosteira maomingensis is published by Danilov et al. (2017).
- A study on the histology of the shell bones of Kizylkumemys schultzi is published by Skutschas et al. (2017).
- Morphologically and histologically diagnostic trionychid specimens are reported from the Early Cretaceous (Barremian–Aptian) of Japan by Nakajima et al. (2017).
- A study on the shell morphology, phylogenetic relationships and paleoecology of the Cretaceous trionychid Helopanoplia distincta is published by Joyce & Lyson (2017).
- A redescription of the holotype specimen of Procyclanorbis sardus (a Miocene trionychid from Sardinia, Italy) is published by Georgalis et al. (2017).
- Fossilized shell remains of geoemydids, kinosternids and a chelydrid are described from five Pleistocene localities belonging to the Tablazo Formation (Ecuador) by Cadena, Abella & Gregori (2017).
- Fossils of a member of the tortoise genus Titanochelon are described from the early Pleistocene of Spain by Pérez-García, Vlachos & Arribas (2017), representing the youngest evidence of a large tortoise in continental Europe.
- Redescription of the giant fossil tortoise "Testudo" gymnesica from the Balearic Islands (Spain) and a study on the phylogenetic relationships of the species is published by Luján et al. (2017).
- New, more complete fossil material of the Oligocene species Procolpochelys charlestonensis, as well as fused dentaries of a late Eocene member of the genus Euclastes (the most recent fossils of a member of the genus reported so far) are described from South Carolina by Weems & Brown (2017).
- Lindgren et al. (2017) examine, at the molecular level, details of the soft tissue anatomy of the holotype specimen of Tasbacka danica.
- A study on the anatomy of the neck vertebrae of the Late Jurassic stem-pleurodire Platychelys oberndorferi and its implications for the mechanism allowing neck and head retraction in this species is published by Anquetin, Tong & Claude (2017).
- A study on the anatomy of the shell and pelvis of the specimens of Platychelys oberndorferi from Switzerland is published by Sullivan & Joyce (2017).
- A plate from the Lower Cretaceous (uppermost Hauterivian-basal Barremian) El Castellar Formation (Spain) is interpreted as the oldest known record of the stem-pleurodire family Dortokidae by Pérez-García, Cobos & Royo-Torres (2017).
- A description of a large shell fragment from the Late Cretaceous Marília Formation (Brazil), interpreted as belonging to the largest podocnemidoid turtle reported from the Bauru Basin so far, is published by Hermanson, Ferreira & Langer (2017).
- A study on the skulls of the Late Cretaceous stem-podocnemidid Bauruemys elegans from the Presidente Prudente Formation (Brazil) is published by Mariani & Romano (2017), who interpret all specimens as belonging to the same species and likely to the same population, assess the ontogenetic changes in the skull of B. elegans and tentatively assess the changes of eating preference habits over ontogeny in the species.
- Two incomplete hatchling specimens of members of the genus Araripemys are described from the Lower Cretaceous Crato Formation (Brazil) by Oliveira & Kellner (2017).
- A revision of the fossil turtles from the Eocene clays in the vicinities of Kyiv (Ukraine) is published by Zvonok & Danilov (2017).

=== New taxa ===
Name	Novelty	Status	Authors	Age	Unit	Location	Notes	Images
Andrewsemys	Gen. et comb. nov	Valid	Pérez-García	Late Eocene and early Oligocene		Egypt	A member of the family Podocnemididae belonging to the subfamily Erymnochelyinae; a new genus for "Stereogenys" libyca Andrews (1903).	
Apalone amorense	Sp. nov	Valid	Valdes, Bourque & Vitek	Miocene (Clarendonian)	Alachua Formation	United States (Florida)	A species of Apalone.	
Cabindachelys	Gen. et sp. nov	Valid	Myers et al.	Early Paleocene		Angola	A stem-cheloniid. The type species is C. landanensis.	
Chelonoidis marcanoi	Sp. nov	Disputed	Turvey et al.	Late Quaternary		Dominican Republic	A tortoise, a species of Chelonoidis. Considered to be a nomen dubium by Albury et al. (2018).	
Eocenochelus	Gen. et comb. et 2 sp. nov	Valid	Pérez-García, de Lapparent de Broin & Murelaga	Eocene (middle Ypresian to Priabonian)		Belgium; France; Spain; United Kingdom	A member of Podocnemididae belonging to the subfamily Erymnochelyinae. The type species is "Erymnochelys" eremberti Broin (1977); genus also includes new species E. lacombianus and E. farresi.	
Lutemys	Gen. et sp. nov	Valid	Lyson, Joyce & Sertich	Late Cretaceous (Campanian)	Kaiparowits Formation	United States (Utah)	A stem-kinosternoid. Genus includes new species L. warreni.	
Mendozachelys	Gen. et sp. nov	Valid	De la Fuente et al.	Late Cretaceous (late Campanian–early Maastrichtian)	Loncoche Formation	Argentina	A member of Chelidae. The type species is M. wichmanni.	
Perochelys hengshanensis	Sp. nov	Valid	Brinkman, Rabi & Zhao	Early Cretaceous	Hengshan Formation	China	A pan-trionychid.	
Petrochelys	Gen. et comb. nov	Valid	Vitek et al.	Early Cretaceous (Albian)		Kyrgyzstan	A member of Trionychidae; a new genus for "Trionyx" kyrgyzensis Nessov (1995).	
Plesiochelys bigleri	Sp. nov	Valid	Püntener, Anquetin & Billon-Bruyat	Late Jurassic (Kimmeridgian)	Reuchenette Formation	Switzerland	A member of the family Plesiochelyidae.	
Rionegrochelys	Gen. et sp. nov	Valid	De la Fuente, Maniel & Jannello in De La Fuente et al.	Late Cretaceous	Plottier Formation	Argentina	A relative of members of the family Chelidae. The type species is R. caldieroi.	
"Trionyx" onomatoplokos	Nom. nov	Valid	Georgalis & Joyce	Late Cretaceous (Santonian–early Campanian)	Bostobe Svita	Kazakhstan	A member of Pan-Trionychidae of uncertain phylogenetic placement; a replacement name for Palaeotrionyx riabinini Kuznetsov & Chkhikvadze (1987).	

== Archosauriformes ==
=== Other archosauriforms ===
- A study on the microstructure of the osteoderms of doswelliids and proterochampsids, as well as its implications for inferring the paleoecology of members of these groups, is published by Ponce et al. (2017).
- Diandongosuchus fuyuanensis, originally thought to be a member of Poposauroidea, is reinterpreted as a basal phytosaur by Stocker et al. (2017).
- A study on the morphology of the braincase of the phytosaur Wannia scurriensis is published by Lessner & Stocker (2017).
- A description of the morphology of the sacrum of Smilosuchus adamanensis is published by Griffin et al. (2017).

== Other reptiles ==
=== Research ===
- A study on the red blood cell size in fossil tetrapods, especially archosauromorph reptiles and synapsids, as indicated by bone microstructure, is published by Huttenlocker & Farmer (2017).
- A study on the phylogenetic relationships of mesosaurs and other early reptiles is published by Laurin & Piñeiro (2017); this study is subsequently reevaluated by MacDougall et al. (2018).
- A study on the diet of the mesosaurs from the Early Permian Irati Formation (Brazil) and Mangrullo Formation (Uruguay) is published by Da Silva et al. (2017).
- A specimen of the mesosaur species Stereosternum tumidum affected by congenital scoliosis is described from the Permian of Brazil by Szczygielski et al. (2017).
- New cranial material of Colobomycter pholeter, revealing previously unknown aspects of the anatomy of the skull, is described by Macdougall et al. (2017).
- A study on the bone histology of Permian pareiasaurs from South Africa and its implications for the lifestyle and growth patterns of pareiasaurs is published by Canoville & Chinsamy (2017).
- A study on rates of morphological evolution in members of the family Captorhinidae and on whether changes of evolutionary rates coincided with shifts in diet is published by Brocklehurst (2017).
- A study on the phylogenetic relationships, species richness and morphological diversity of captorhinids is published by Romano, Brocklehurst & Fröbisch (2017).
- Partial maxillary toothplate of an early reptile, probably a juvenile specimen of Labidosaurikos meachami, is described from the Lower Permian Arroyo Formation (Texas, United States) by Jung & Sumida (2017).
- Description of a juvenile specimen Eusaurosphargis dalsassoi from the Middle Triassic (Ladinian) Upper Prosanto Formation (Switzerland), interpreted as most likely to be a terrestrial animal, and a study on the phylogenetic relationships of the species is published by Scheyer et al. (2017).
- A restudy of Arctosaurus osborni is published by Sues (2017), who considers this species to be an archosauromorph reptile, possibly an allokotosaurian.
- A study on the geological setting, anatomy and phylogenetic relationships of the rhynchosaur species Supradapedon stockleyi is published by Langer, da Rosa & Montefeltro (2017).
- A specimen of Dinocephalosaurus containing an embryo, providing evidence of live birth in this taxon, is described from the Middle Triassic of China by Liu et al. (2017).
- A well-preserved, curled-up skeleton of an embryo of a marine protorosaur related to Dinocephalosaurus is described from the Middle Triassic Guanling Formation (China) by Li, Rieppel & Fraser (2017).
- A study on the histology of the postcranial bones of Tanystropheus and Macrocnemus, and its implications for the ecology and mode of growth in these taxa, is published by Jaquier & Scheyer (2017).
- A skeleton of a member of the genus Macrocnemus related to the species M. fuyuanensis is described from the Middle Triassic Besano Formation (Switzerland) by Jaquier et al. (2017).
- Diverse archosauromorph tracks are described from the Early Triassic (Olenekian) of the Catalan Pyrenees by Mujal et al. (2017), who name a new ichnotaxon Prorotodactylus mesaxonichnus described on the basis of footprints which might have been left by a euparkeriid or a similar basal archosauriform.

=== New taxa ===
Name	Novelty	Status	Authors	Age	Unit	Location	Notes	Images
Avicranium	Gen. et sp. nov		Pritchard & Nesbitt	Late Triassic (late Norian or Rhaetian)	Chinle Formation	United States (New Mexico)	A member of the family Drepanosauridae. The type species is A. renestoi.	
Pectodens	Gen. et sp. nov	Valid	Li et al.	Middle Triassic (Anisian)	Guanling Formation	China	A long-necked archosauromorph reptile of uncertain phylogenetic placement, possibly a member of Protorosauria. The type species is P. zhenyuensis.	
Shringasaurus	Gen. et sp. nov	Valid	Sengupta, Ezcurra & Bandyopadhyay	Middle Triassic (Anisian)	Denwa Formation	India	An archosauromorph reptile belonging to the group Allokotosauria and the family Azendohsauridae. The type species is S. indicus.	
