= Graphical timeline of plesiosaurs =

== Taxa ==
Taxon	First Appearance Datum	Last Appearance Datum	Previous Estimates	Image
Abyssosaurus nataliae	Late Hauterivian	Late Hauterivian	Late Hauterivian	
Albertonectes vanderveldei	Late Campanian	Late Campanian	Late Campanian	Life restoration of Albertonectes vanderveldei
Alexandronectes zealandiensis	Early Maastrichtian	Early Maastrichtian	Early Maastrichtian	
Alexeyisaurus karnoushenkoi	Early-Middle Norian	Early-Middle Norian	Early-Middle Norian	
Aphrosaurus furlongi	Maastrichtian	Maastrichtian	Maastrichtian	
Aristonectes parvidens	Maastrichtian	Maastrichtian	Maastrichtian	Life restoration of Aristonectes parvidens
Aristonectes quiriquinensis	Late Maastrichtian	Late Maastrichtian	Late Maastrichtian	Life restoration of Aristonectes quiriquinensis
Attenborosaurus conybeari	Sinemurian	Sinemurian	Sinemurian	Life restoration of Attenborosaurus conybeari
Cardiocorax mukulu	Early Maastrichtian	Early Maastrichtian	Early Maastrichtian	
Dolichorhynchops herschelensis	Late Campanian-Early Maastrichtian	Late Campanian-Early Maastrichtian	Campanian-Maastrichtian, Late Campanian-Early Maastrichtian	
Scalamagnus tropicensis	Turonian	Turonian	Turonian	
Edgarosaurus muddi	Late Albian	Late Albian	Albian, Late Albian	Life restoration of Edgarosaurus muddi
Eromangasaurus australis	Albian	Albian	Albian	Life restoration of Eromangasaurus australis
Manemergus anguirostris	Early Turonian	Early Turonian	Maastrichtian, Early Turonian	Fossil skeleton of Manemergus anguirostris
Nichollssaura borealis	Early Albian	Early Albian	Early Albian	Life restoration of two Nichollssaura borealis
Pahasapasaurus haasi	Cenomanian	Cenomanian	Cenomanian	
Plesiopleurodon wellesi	Earliest Cenomanian	Earliest Cenomanian	Cenomanian, Earliest Cenomanian	Life restoration of Plesiopleurodon wellesi
Plesiosaurus dolichodeirus	Late Sinemurian	Late Sinemurian	Sinemurian, Late Sinemurian	Life restoration of Plesiosaurus dolichodeirus
Plesiosaurus macrocephalus	Sinemurian	Sinemurian	Sinemurian	
Plesiosaurus longirostris	Toarcian	Toarcian	Toarcian	Skeletal mount of Hauffiosaurus longirostris
Pliosaurus brachydeirus	Early Kimmeridgian	Early Kimmeridgian	Kimmeridgian, Early Kimmeridgian	Life restoration of Pliosaurus brachydeirus
Pliosaurus portentificus	Kimmeridgian	Kimmeridgian	Kimmeridgian	
Pliosaurus brachyspondylus	Kimmeridgian	Kimmeridgian		
Pliosaurus irgisensis	Tithonian	Tithonian	Tithonian	
Pliosaurus macromerus	Callovian-Tithonian	Callovian-Tithonian	Callovian-Tithonian	Lower jaw of Pliosaurus macromerus with restorative model.
Pliosaurus andrewsi	Callovian	Callovian	Callovian	
Polyptychodon interruptus	Turonian-Santonian	Turonian-Santonian	Turonian-Santonian	Life restoration of Polyptychodon interruptus
Elasmosaurus platyurus	Campanian	Campanian	Campanian	Life restoration of two Elasmosaurus platyurus
Polycotylus latipinnis	Santonian-Campanian	Santonian-Campanian	Santonian, Santonian-Campanian	Life restoration of a Polycotylus latipinnis giving birth
Liopleurodon rossicus	Tithonian	Tithonian	Tithonian	Life restoration of Pliosaurus rossicus -->
Liopleurodon pachydeirus	Callovian	Callovian	Callovian	
Liopleurodon ferox	Callovian	Callovian	Callovian	
Callawayasaurus colombiensis	Aptian	Aptian	Aptian	Skull of Callawayasaurus colombiensis
Kronosaurus boyacensis	Aptian-Albian	Aptian-Albian	Aptian-Albian	Life restoration of Kronosaurus boyacensis
Opallionectes andamookaensis	Aptian-Albian	Aptian-Albian	Aptian-Albian	
Kronosaurus queenslandicus	Aptian-Albian	Aptian-Albian	Aptian-Albian	Life restoration of Kronosaurus queenslandicus
Umoonasaurus demoscyllus	Aptian-Albian	Aptian-Albian	Aptian-Albian	Life restoration of Umoonasaurus demoscyllus
Simolestes keileni	Bajocian	Bajocian	Bajocian	
Maresaurus coccai	Bajocian	Bajocian	Bajocian	
Leptocleidus superstes	Barremian	Barremian	Barremian	Bones of Leptocleidus superstes
Yuzhoupliosaurus chengjiangensis	Bathonian	Bathonian	Bathonian	
Brancasaurus brancai	Berriasian	Berriasian	Berriasian	Skeleton of Brancasaurus brancai
Muraenosaurus leedsi	Callovian	Callovian	Callovian	Life restoration of Muraenosaurus leedsi
Cryptoclidus richardsoni	Callovian	Callovian	Callovian	
Tricleidus seeleyi	Callovian	Callovian	Callovian	Bones of Tricleidus seeleyi
Vinialesaurus caroli	Callovian	Callovian	Callovian	
Muraenosaurus beloclis	Callovian	Callovian	Callovian	
Peloneustes philarchus	Callovian	Callovian	Callovian	Life restoration of Peloneustes philarchus
Cryptoclidus eurymerus	Callovian	Callovian	Callovian	Life restoration of Cryptoclidus eurymerus
Simolestes vorax	Callovian	Callovian	Callovian	Life restoration of Simolestes vorax
Pachycostasaurus dawni	Callovian	Callovian	Callovian	
Terminonatator ponteixensis	Campanian	Campanian	Campanian	
Mauisaurus haasti	Campanian	Campanian	Campanian	Life restoration of Mauisaurus haasti
Dolichorhynchops osborni	Santonian-Campanian	Santonian-Campanian	Campanian, Santonian-Campanian	
Martinectes bonneri	Early Campanian	Early Campanian	Early Campanian	Skeletal mount of Martinectes bonneri
Tuarangisaurus keysei	Campanian-Maastrichtian	Campanian-Maastrichtian	Campanian-Maastrichtian	Skeleton of Tuarangisaurus keysei
Thalassomedon haningtoni	Cenomanian	Cenomanian	Cenomanian	Life restoration of Thalassomedon haningtoni
Brachauchenius lucasi	Cenomanian-Turonian	Cenomanian-Turonian	Cenomanian-Turonian	Life restoration of Brachauchenius lucasi
Leptocleidus clemai	Hauterivian-Barremian	Hauterivian-Barremian	Hauterivian-Barremian	
Thalassiodracon hawkinsii	Rhaetian-Hettangian	Rhaetian-Hettangian	Hettangian, Rhaetian-Hettangian	Life restoration of Thalassiodracon hawkinsii
Rhomaleosaurus megacephalus	Hettangian	Hettangian	Hettangian	Life restoration of Rhomaleosaurus megacephalus
Eurycleidus arcuatus	Hettangian	Hettangian	Hettangian	
Macroplata tenuiceps	Hettangian	Hettangian	Hettangian	Life restoration of Macroplata tenuiceps
Kimmerosaurus langhami	Kimmeridgian	Kimmeridgian	Kimmeridgian	
Bathyspondylus swindoniensis	Kimmeridgian	Kimmeridgian	Kimmeridgian	
Megalneusaurus rex	Kimmeridgian-Portlandian	Kimmeridgian-Portlandian	Kimmeridgian-Portlandian	Life restoration of Megalneusaurus rex
Colymbosaurus trochanterius	Kimmeridgian-Tithonian	Kimmeridgian-Tithonian	Kimmeridgian-Tithonian	Sacral vertebra] of Colymbosaurus trochanterius
Sinopliosaurus weiyuanensis	Kimmeridgian?	Kimmeridgian?	Kimmeridgian?	
Fresnosaurus drescheri	Maastrichtian	Maastrichtian	Maastrichtian	
Kaiwhekea katiki	Maastrichtian	Maastrichtian	Maastrichtian	Life restoration of Kaiwhekea katiki
Leurospondylus ultimus	Maastrichtian	Maastrichtian	Maastrichtian	Spine of Leurospondylus ultimus
Morenosaurus stocki	Maastrichtian	Maastrichtian	Maastrichtian	
Hydrotherosaurus alexandrae	Maastrichtian	Maastrichtian	Maastrichtian	
Thililua longicollis	Early Turonian	Early Turonian	Maastrichtian, Early Turonian	Life restoration of Sulcusuchus erraini
Sulcusuchus erraini	"Campanian/Maastrichtian"	"Campanian/Maastrichtian"	Maastrichtian, "Campanian/Maastrichtian"	
Tatenectes laramiensis	Oxfordian	Oxfordian	Oxfordian	
Pantosaurus striatus	Oxfordian	Oxfordian	Oxfordian	
Futabasaurus suzukii	Santonian	Santonian	Santonian	Life restoration of Futabasaurus suzukii
Georgiasaurus penzensis	Santonian	Santonian	Santonian	
Styxosaurus snowii	Santonian-Campanian	Santonian-Campanian	Santonian-Campanian	Life restoration of Styxosaurus snowii
Hydralmosaurus serpentinus	Santonian-Campanian	Santonian-Campanian	Santonian-Campanian	
Archaeonectrus rostratus	Sinemurian	Sinemurian	Sinemurian	Fossil of Archaeonectrus rostratus
Eretmosaurus rugosus	Sinemurian	Sinemurian	Sinemurian	Fossil of Eretmosaurus rugosus
Simolestes indicus	Tithonian	Tithonian	Tithonian	
Rhomaleosaurus cramptoni	Toarcian	Toarcian	Toarcian	Life restoration of Rhomaleosaurus cramptoni
Rhomaleosaurus victor				
Bishanopliosaurus youngi	Toarcian	Toarcian	Toarcian	Life restoration of Bishanopliosaurus youngi
Occitanosaurus tournemirensis	Toarcian	Toarcian	Toarcian	
Hydrorion brachypterygius	Toarcian	Toarcian	Toarcian	Life restoration of Hydrorion brachypterygius
Microcleidus homalospondylus	Toarcian	Toarcian	Toarcian	Life restoration of Microcleidus homalospondylus
Microcleidus macropterus	Toarcian	Toarcian	Toarcian	
Sthenarasaurus dawkins	Toarcian	Toarcian	Toarcian	
Seeleysaurus guilelmiimperatoris	Toarcian	Toarcian	Toarcian	Life restoration of Seeleysaurus guilelmiimperatoris
Hauffiosaurus zanoni	Toarcian	Toarcian	Toarcian	Life restoration of Hauffiosaurus zanoni
Libonectes atlasense	Turonian	Turonian	Turonian	
Palmula quadratus	Turonian	Turonian	Turonian, Turonian	
Trinacromerum bentonianum	Turonian	Turonian	Turonian, Turonian	Life restoration of Trinacromerum bentonianum
Trinacromerum kirki	Turonian	Turonian	Turonian	Skeleton of Trinacromerum kirki
Libonectes morgani	Coniacian	Coniacian	Turonian, Coniacian	Life restoration of Libonectes morgani
Eopolycotylus rankini	Turonian	Turonian	Turonian, Turonian	
Leptocleidus capensis	Valanginian	Valanginian	Valanginian	Life restoration of Leptocleidus capensis
Pliosaurus funkei				
Lusonectes sauvagei				Bones of Lusonectes sauvagei
Djupedalia engeri				
Avalonnectes arturi				Avalonnectes arturi
Eoplesiosaurus antiquior				Eoplesiosaurus antiquior
Stratesaurus taylori				Stratesaurus taylori
Anningasaura lymense				Skull of Anningasaura lymense
Zarafasaura oceanis				Skull and neck of Zarafasaura oceanis
Westphaliasaurus simonsensii	Pliensbachian	Pliensbachian	Pliensbachian	
Marmornectes candrewi				
Hauffiosaurus tomistomimus]				
Meyerasaurus victor			Toarcian	Life restoration of Meyerasaurus victor
Megacephalosaurus eulerti				
Gronausaurus wegneri				
Cryonectes neustriacus				Cryonectes neustriacus
Vectocleidus pastorum				
Hastanectes valdensis				
Spitrasaurus wensaasi				
Spitrasaurus larseni				
Nakonanectes bradti	Sinemurian	Sinemurian		
Mauriciosaurus fernandezi	Early Turonian	Early Turonian		
Polycotylus sopozkoi				
Dawazisaurus brevis				
Lariosaurus vosseveldensis				
Stenorhynchosaurus munozi				
Vegasaurus molyi	Early Maastrichtian	Early Maastrichtian	Early Maastrichtian	
Kawanectes lafquenianum				
Atychodracon megacephalus				Life restoration of Atychodracon megacephalus
Anguanax zignoi				Anguanax zignoi
Pliosaurus patagonicus				
Pliosaurus patagonicus				
Pliosaurus carpenteri	Late Kimmeridgian	Late Kimmeridgian	Late Kimmeridgian	
Pliosaurus kevani	Early Kimmeridgian	Kimmeridgian	Early Kimmeridgian-Kimmeridgian	Pliosaurus kevani
Pliosaurus westburyensis	Late Kimmeridgian	Late Kimmeridgian	Late Kimmeridgian	
Luskhan itilensis	Hauterivian	Hauterivian		
Arminisaurus schuberti	Late Pliensbachian	Late Pliensbachian		Life restoration of Arminisaurus schuberti
Lagenanectes richterae	Early Hauterivian	Early Barremian		Known material of Lagenanectes richterae with a human to scale
