= Oardasaurus =

Oardasaurus Temporal range: Maastrichtian, 72 Ma

Scientific classification
- Kingdom: Animalia
- Phylum: Chordata
- Class: Reptilia
- Order: Squamata
- Family: †Barbatteiidae
- Genus: †Oardasaurus; Codrea et al., 2017

Type species
- Oardasaurus glyphis Codrea et al., 2017

Extinct genus of reptiles

Oardasaurus (meaning "Oarda de Jos lizard") is an extinct genus of lizard from the latest Cretaceous of Romania. It is a member of the Barbatteiidae, a group of lizards closely related to the Teiidae. At 20 centimetres (7.9 in) in length, it was much smaller than the only other named member of the Barbatteiidae, Barbatteius, which lived slightly later. Like Barbatteius, Oardasaurus can be identified by the presence of a crust of bone deposits, or osteoderms, on the roof of its skull; it differs from Barbatteius in the pattern of the sculpturing on this crust. Both Oardasaurus and Barbatteius lived in the isolated island ecosystem of Hațeg Island, having rapidly diversified into various generalist predators of small prey after their arrival on the island during the Early Cretaceous. They went extinct in the Cretaceous–Paleogene extinction event.

== Description ==
Oardasaurus is a small lizard, measuring roughly 20 cm (7.9 in) long. It is smaller than its close relative Barbatteius, which measures up to 80 cm (31 in) long. Like the teiioids Meyasaurus and Pedrerasaurus, the teeth of Oardasaurus are heterodont (i.e. having several types) but are consistently bicuspid (i.e. bearing two cusps), with the rear cusp being larger. The teeth probably underwent replacement. Unlike modern Teiidae, there are no crushing teeth in the back of the jaw. Among lizards, Oardasaurus and Barbatteius are unique in that their temporal muscles originate from attachments on the upper portions of their parietal bones; and in that their upper temporal fenestrae are not obscured by either the postorbital bones or the postfrontal bones.

A characteristic of the family Barbatteiidae, which Oardasaurus and Barbatteius belong to, is the presence of an extensive crust of osteoderms, separated by deep grooves, on the bones of the skull roof (including the parietals, postorbitals, and frontals, with the latter having a slightly different arrangement). These osteoderms preserve the imprints (collectively known as the "pileus") of the scales that laid over them. In modern Teiidae, the arrangement of the pileus (which is present directly on the skull roof due to an absent or limited osteoderm crust) varies between species, while it is fairly constant in modern Lacertidae. In Oardasaurus, the occipital (rear) scale of the pileus is subdivided into three smaller osteoderms in Oardasaurus, unlike Barbatteius, Meyasaurus, and the lacertid Plesiolacerta where there is no such division. The variable division in Barbetteiidae may be transitional between teiids and lacertids.

In Oardasaurus, the frontal bones are completely fused, and the suture between the frontal and parietal is straight but has a jagged margin. They are also fused in Barbatteius and adult Meyasaurus, but they remain unfused in Pedrerasaurus and young Meyasaurus. Additionally, the margin where each frontal borders the eye socket is markedly concave in Oardasaurus. On the bottom part of the rear of each frontal, there is a small triangular depression, located just behind the crest known as crista cranii frontalis. These depressions are probably where "lappets" from the parietals inserted, much like Barabetteius and Meyasaurus.

== Discovery and naming ==
Fossil remains of Oardasaurus were found in the site of Oarda de Jos A (ODA), which is located near the village of Oarda de Jos in southern Transylvania, Romania, 3 km (1.9 mi) south of Alba Iulia on the eastern shore of the Sebeș River. The site consists of Cretaceous continental deposits, belonging to the early Maastrichtian Șard Formation, exposed as a slope 50 m (160 ft) long and 17–19 m (56–62 ft) high. Grey-black silt clays form much of the deposits. From 2008 to 2015, about 2.8 tonnes (3.1 short tons) of sediment were screen-washed at the site; the remains of Oardasaurus were among the specimens found.

The type specimen of Oardasaurus, an incomplete parietal bone, is stored at the Palaeontological Laboratory of the Palaeontology-Stratigraphy Museum of Babeș-Bolyai University (PSMUBB) in Cluj-Napoca, Romania, under the specimen number PSMUBB.ODAN-A-12. Additional specimens, all stored at the PSMUBB, include PSMUBB.ODAN-A-13, a fragment from a parietal bone; PSMUBB.ODAN-A-18, a mostly complete but flattened postorbital bone; PSMUBB.ODAN-A-15 (also known as ODAN-Lizard 4), -16, -17, and -23, all fused frontal bones; PSMUBB.ODAN-A-19 (or ODAN-Amf-8), -20, and -21, all incomplete maxillae. The frontal bones belong to three different size classes, with -15 being largest, -16 and -17 being intermediate, and -23 being smallest.

In 2017, Oardasaurus was named as a new genus by Vlad Codrea, Márton Venczel, and Alexandru Solomon in a research paper. They named the genus after the village of Oarda de Jos, combined with the suffix -saurus, which means "lizard". One species was assigned to this genus by Codrea and colleagues, O. glyphis. Glyphis is derived from the Greek glyphe, meaning "carving". For their research paper, Codrea and colleagues used a scanning electron microscope at the Royal Belgian Institute of Natural Sciences in Brussels, Belgium to photograph the parietal, frontal, and maxilla.

== Classification ==
Despite the differing arrangements of their pileus impressions as well as the large gap in body size that separates them, the skull roofs of Oardasaurus and Barbatteius are still united by the presence of an osteoderm encrusting with pileus impressions, with a differentiated pattern on the frontals; the origin of the temporal muscles being located on the upper portion of the parietals (similar to other teiioids but unlike lacertoids); and the unobscured upper temporal fenestrae. Meyasaurus also shares the former two traits.

Codrea and colleagues thus assigned Oardasaurus and Barbatteius to the new family Barbatteiidae. They also referred some indeterminate remains of the lower jaw - the prearticular and articular bones PSMUBB.ODAN-A-22, as well as the dentary PSMUBB.ODAN-A-24 - to this family. The family is diagnosed by the above traits as well as the presence of lappets of the parietals (shared by teiioids and lacertids), the constriction of the frontals to between the eye sockets, the widening of the squamosal bones at the rear; and the absence of a prearticular crest as well as the presence of a pterygoideus process on the prearticular bone of the lower jaw. It is unclear how closely related barbatteiids are to Meyasaurus, due to a lack of comparable bones beyond the skull.

A phylogenetic analysis previously conducted by Venczel and Codrea to accompany the description of Barbatteius demonstrated that Barbatteius, and by extension other barbatteiids, are members of the Teiioidea. This inclusion is based on the fusion of the frontals as well as the inclusion of the prootic bone in the recessus scalae tympani, a structure of the inner ear. They also found that a number of characteristics were shared by Barbatteiidae and Teiidae, including the overlap of the squamosal by the postorbital; the origin of the temporal muscles on the upper portion of the parietals, which is overlapped by the contact between the parietals and the ectopterygoid bones; and the weakly-developed shelf on the inside of the tooth row. The phylogenetic tree is reproduced below.

- Lacertoidea
  - - Takydromus
    - Lacerta
  - Teiioidea
    - - Pholidobolus
      - Colobosaura
    - - - Meyasaurus
        - Barbatteiidae
          Barbatteius
      - - - Teius
          - Aspidoscelis
        - - Tupinambis
          - Callopistes

Although superficially similar to barbatteiids and other teiioids, the Polyglyphanodontia (which also lived on the Transylvanian landmass) likely bore no close relation, instead representing an independent evolutionary radiation of more specialized Toxicofera close to iguanians.

== Paleobiology ==
The absence of enlarged, specialized crushing teeth in the jaws of Oardasaurus and other barbateiids suggests that they were feeding on a varied diet of arthropods (such as insects, millipedes, and spiders), small vertebrates (fish, amphibians, turtle hatchlings, smaller lizards, and perhaps multituberculate mammals), and plants. A dentary referred to Barbatteius bears a furrow, probably produced by plant roots.

== Paleoecology ==
Although barbatteiids are restricted temporally and geographically to the Maastrichtian of Transylvania, they likely originated earlier, based on the presence of Meyasaurus in the Early Cretaceous of Spain. It is probable that they originated from ancestral teiioids in Gondwana, which reached the Transylvanian region - then part of an isolated landmass measuring about 80,000 square kilometres (31,000 sq mi) in area and separated from other land by 200–300 km (120–190 mi) of ocean in all directions - through venturing across the Mediterranean Sea from either Africa or "mainland" Europe in the Early Cretaceous. Once they reached the isolated ecosystem of this landmass, known as Hațeg Island, they underwent an adaptive radiation. No records of barbatteiid-like lizards are known in the deposits of Paleogene Europe, indicating that they likely died in the Cretaceous–Paleogene extinction event.

The Hațeg Island ecosystem was located farther south than its present latitude of 45°N in the Late Cretaceous, being located at 27°N. Hațeg Island's climate was likely subtropical but dry, with an annual precipitation of less than 1,000 mm (39 in); it was also probably seasonal, with distinct wet and dry seasons. The average temperature was about 25 °C (77 °F). Oardasaurus lived around a system of braided rivers containing localized ponds, surrounded by woodlands that contained angiosperms such as Mastixia (known from fruit) as well as conifers like Telephragmoxylon (known from tree trunks).

At Oarda de Jos A, crocodilian remains belonging to Allodaposuchus are very numerous; the area was probably "full of" them. Other crocodilians, such as Doratodon and Acynodon, were present in smaller numbers. Many bones found in the area exhibit bite marks, which they probably produced. Dinosaurs have also been found, including the ornithopods Telmatosaurus and Zalmoxes; titanosaurian sauropods; indeterminate dromaeosaurid theropods; and enantiornithine birds (including eggs), interpreted as representing a breeding colony. Rare remains of pterosaurs probably do not represent native fauna.

Turtles at Oarda de Jos A are represented by Kallokibotion as well as a possible indeterminate member of the Dortokidae; the latter would have preferred to live in pond-like environments. Indeterminate frogs and members of the Albanerpetontidae have also been found. The kogaionid multituberculate mammal Barbatodon is known from Oarda de Jos A. Fish remains are abundant but not very diverse, appearing to belong only to gars and characids. Finally, invertebrates are also known, including gastropod and claws from crabs. It is not clear if the crabs are native freshwater crabs, or were transported from marine environments.
