= Meyasaurus =

Meyasaurus Temporal range: Barremian 130–125 Ma

Scientific classification
- Domain: Eukaryota
- Kingdom: Animalia
- Phylum: Chordata
- Class: Reptilia
- Order: Squamata
- Family: Teiidae
- Genus: †Meyasaurus; Vidal, 1915

Type species
- Meyasaurus faurai Vidal, 1915

Species
- List of species: M. faurai Vidal, 1915; M. crusafonti Hoffstetter, 1966; M. unaensis Richter, 1994; M. diazromerali Evans and Barbadillo, 1997

Synonyms
- Ilerdaesaurus Hoffstetter, 1966 Rubiessaurus Gomez Pallerola, 1979

Extinct genus of lizards

Meyasaurus is an extinct genus of Teiid lizard known from the Barremian of Spain and the Isle of Wight, UK. Four species are known from Spain, from the La Huérguina, Camarillas, and La Pedrera de Rúbies Formations while an indeterminate taxon is known from the Wessex Formation of Isle of Wight. It is a possible close relative of Barbatteius and other members of Barbatteiidae.
