= Natural History Museum, Bielefeld =

Coordinates: 52°01′02″N 8°31′42″E

Natural History Museum, Bielefeld Naturkunde-Museum Bielefeld
- Logo of the Natural History Museum Bielefeld
- Established: 1906
- Location: Kreuzstrasse 20 in 33602 Bielefeld, Germany
- Type: Natural history museum
- Director: Ingo Höpfner
- Website: www.namu-ev.de

The Natural History Museum in Bielefeld (German: Naturkunde-Museum Bielefeld) is a natural history museum in the city of Bielefeld in North Rhine-Westphalia, Germany. Since 2003, it was given the additional name namu, which stands for the German words Natur (nature), Mensch (man), and Umwelt (environment). The exhibitions take place in the Spiegelshof, a historical building from the 14th century.

== History ==
1889 is regarded the founding year of the Museum der Stadt Bielefeld (Museum of the city of Bielefeld). In 1906, this museum became the Städtisches Museum (municipal museum), containing both a history and natural history department. In 1930, an independent Natural History Museum was opened in the Kaselowsky villa. After World War II, from 1946 to 1964, the museum had no permanent home, but in 1964, temporary exhibition spaces were established at the Stapenhorststraße 1. Martin Büchner, mineralogist and long-term director of the museum, and other members of the Naturwissenschaftlicher Verein für Bielefeld und Umgegend (Natural history association of Bielefeld and surrounding areas) essentially contributed to the establishment of the new natural history museum and implemented numerous special exhibitions. In 1977, the museum received additional temporary premises at the Kreuzstrasse 38 (now Adenauerplatz 2; and home of the administration and collections of the museum). Finally, in 1986, the museum moved to the Spiegelshof, which since serves as the exhibition building. In 1994, the „Förderverein Naturkunde-Museum der Stadt Bielefeld“ (Friends‘ association of the Natural History Museum of the City of Bielefeld) was founded. Isolde Wrazidlo became director of the museum in 1999, after the retirement of Martin Büchner.

In 2003, the museum received a new logo and the additional name namu, an acronym standing for the German words Natur (nature), Mensch (man), and Umwelt (environment). Subsequent events include the renovation and conversion of the Spiegelsche Hof (2003 and 2004), the museums 100-year-celebration combined with the implementation of the "Naturhistorischen Zeitreise mit der StadtBahn" ("Natural history journal with the light rail" – an installation of replicas of centerpiece specimens from the geological collection displayed in underground light rail stations throughout the inner city of Bielefeld), the opening of the new permanent exhibition "ausSterben – überLeben" (extinction – survival), the acquisition and renovation of the museum's external venue "Grünes Haus" (green house) at the Sparrenburg castle (2007) and the expansion of the educational service (2010). In 2014, the basement of the museum was converted into the "Geostollen", a permanent geological exhibition resembling a mining tunnel. Ingo Höpfner became museum director on Jan 1, 2023

== Collections ==
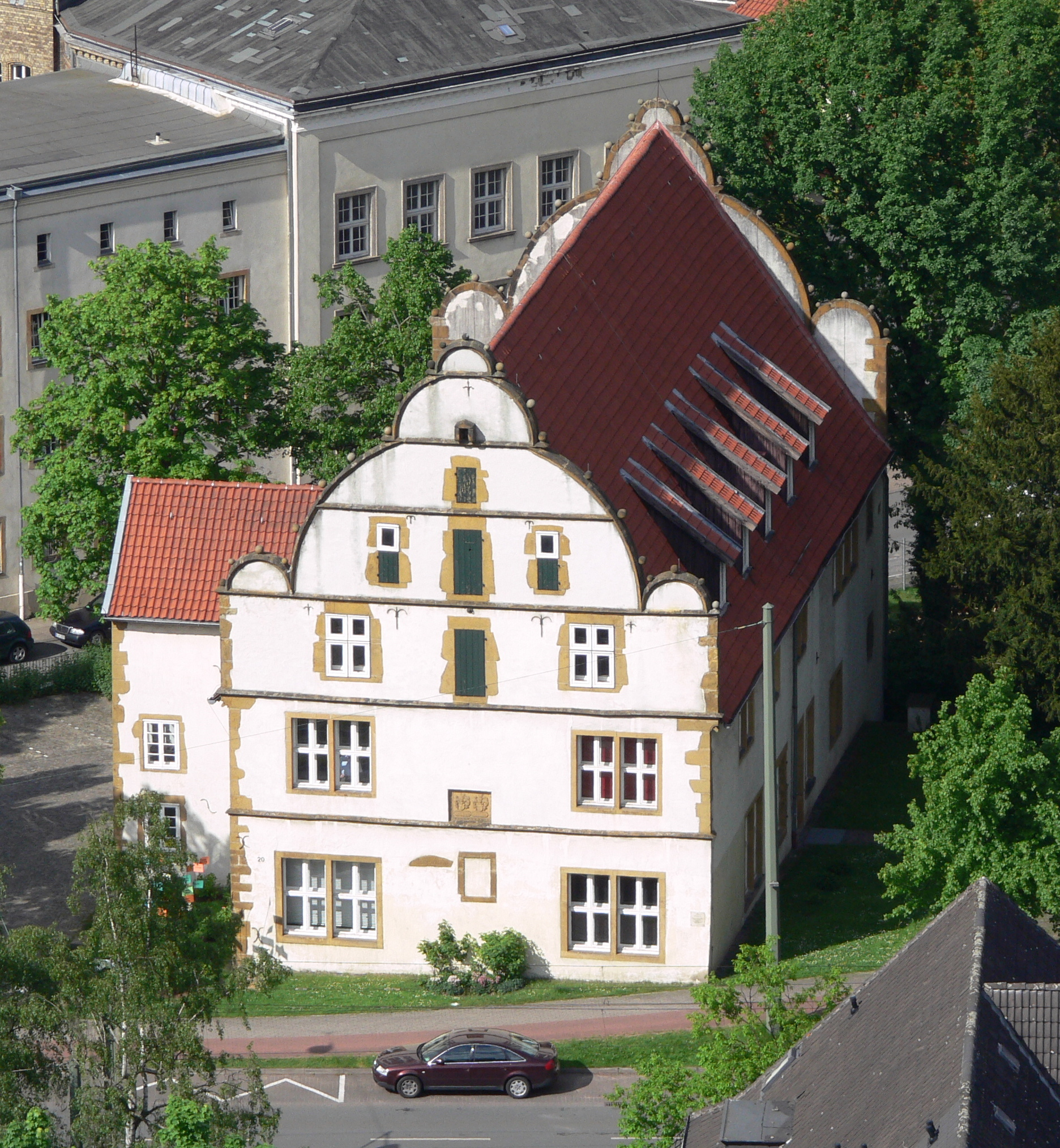
The Naturkunde-Museum Bielefeld at the Spiegelshof

The collections of the Bielefeld Natural History Museum are divided into three parts: the biological, geological and archaeological collection.

The biological collection includes about 410.000 objects.

- The snail and shell collection encompasses 7000 specimens including 657 separate species, giving an overview of the biodiversity of the European shores.
- The bird collection comprises 500 specimens including nearly all of the 250 breeding birds of Germany, among them rare specimens such as the Ortolan bunting, the Northern wheatear and the Great snipe.
- The extensive insect collection with beetles, butterflies, bugs, bees and wasps encompasses about 400.000 specimens. The majority of the objects are native species, among them 50.000 butterflies from Westphalia. The largest part of the insect collection is formed by beetles, with more than 220.000 objects.

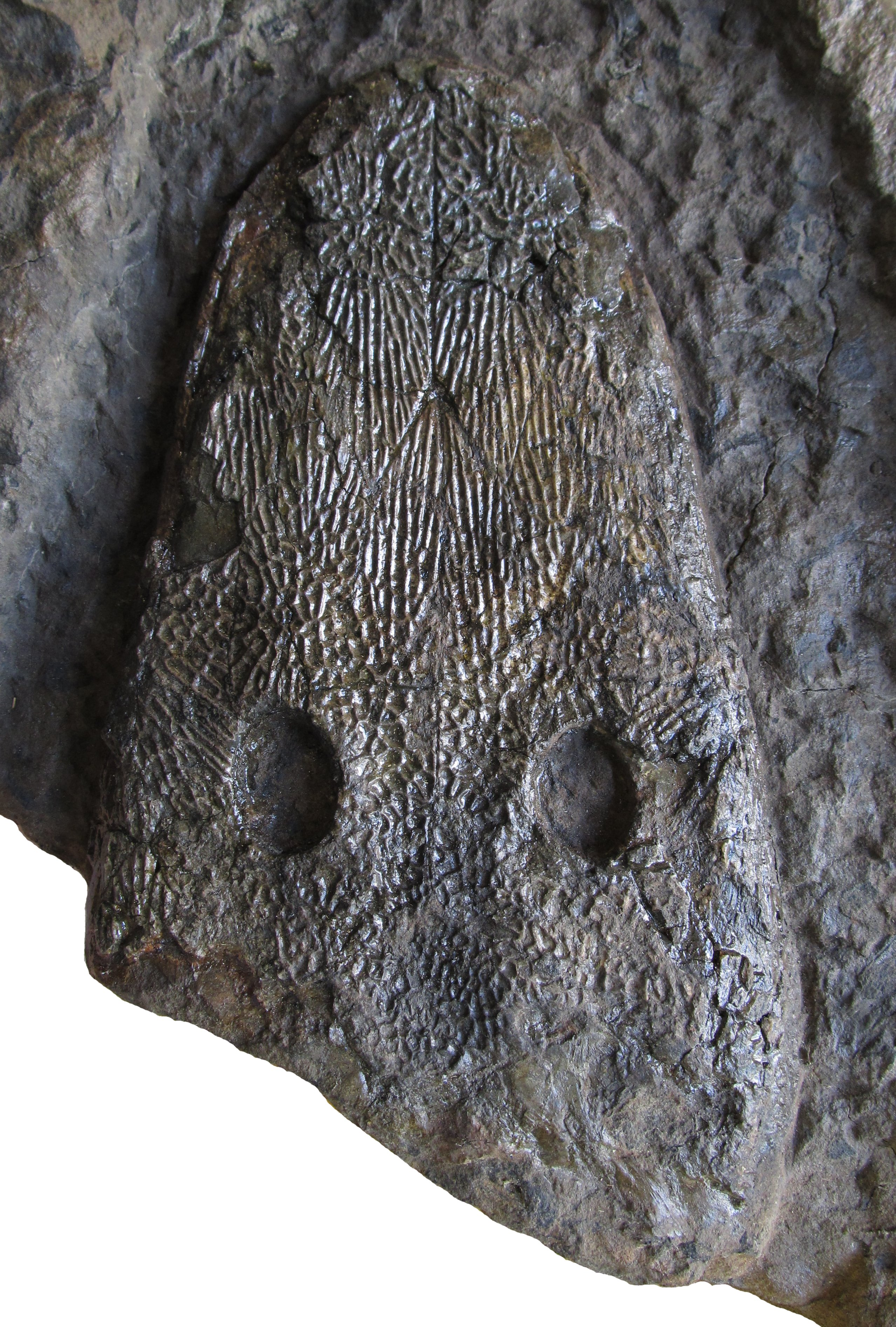
Holotype of Cyclotosaurus buechneri (NAMU ES/k 36053)

The geological collection comprises 60.000 objects of different disciplines.

- The stratigraphical collection comprises 30.000 objects. These are largely fossils and rocks from Mesozoic outcrops of the Bielefeld area, including important fossils such as the holotype specimens of the temnospondyl amphibian Cyclotosaurus buechneri and the plesiosaur Arminisaurus schuberti, which were both found within the city limits of Bielefeld. The palaeontological collection is supplemented by fossils of Pleistocene mammals such as a nearly complete skeleton of a Woolly rhinoceros, found in the area.
- The mineralogical-petrographical collection encompasses ca. 30.000 specimens from Westphalia and the adjacent areas of the Netherlands.

The archaeological collection includes about 100.000 objects.

- The museum owns arrowheads, spearheads, neolithic daggers, sickles, chisels, stone axes with drilling, blades and other objects.
- Focus of the archaeological collection are local early, middle and late neolithic finds from the wider Bielefeld area. Further neolithic artifacts are from Hesse, the Baltic Sea area and from North America. This collection is supplemented by modern objects from Papua New Guinea.

== Exhibition ==
=== Permanent exhibition ===
The present permanent exhibition "ausSterben – überLeben" ("extinction – survival") was opened in 2007. The visitor first enters a room that is designed as an imaginary museum of the year 2525, informing about the extinction of species and nature conservation in the early 21st century. Other rooms explain present day problems from the future perspective. The third part of the permanent exhibition provides an introduction into earth history and explains the importance of fossils in understanding today's imminent mass extinction of species. Another room is dedicated to museum education, allowing kids to playfully approach the topics of the exhibitions. The Geostollen in the basement supplements the exhibition by showing earth science objects and topics in a recreated mining tunnel.

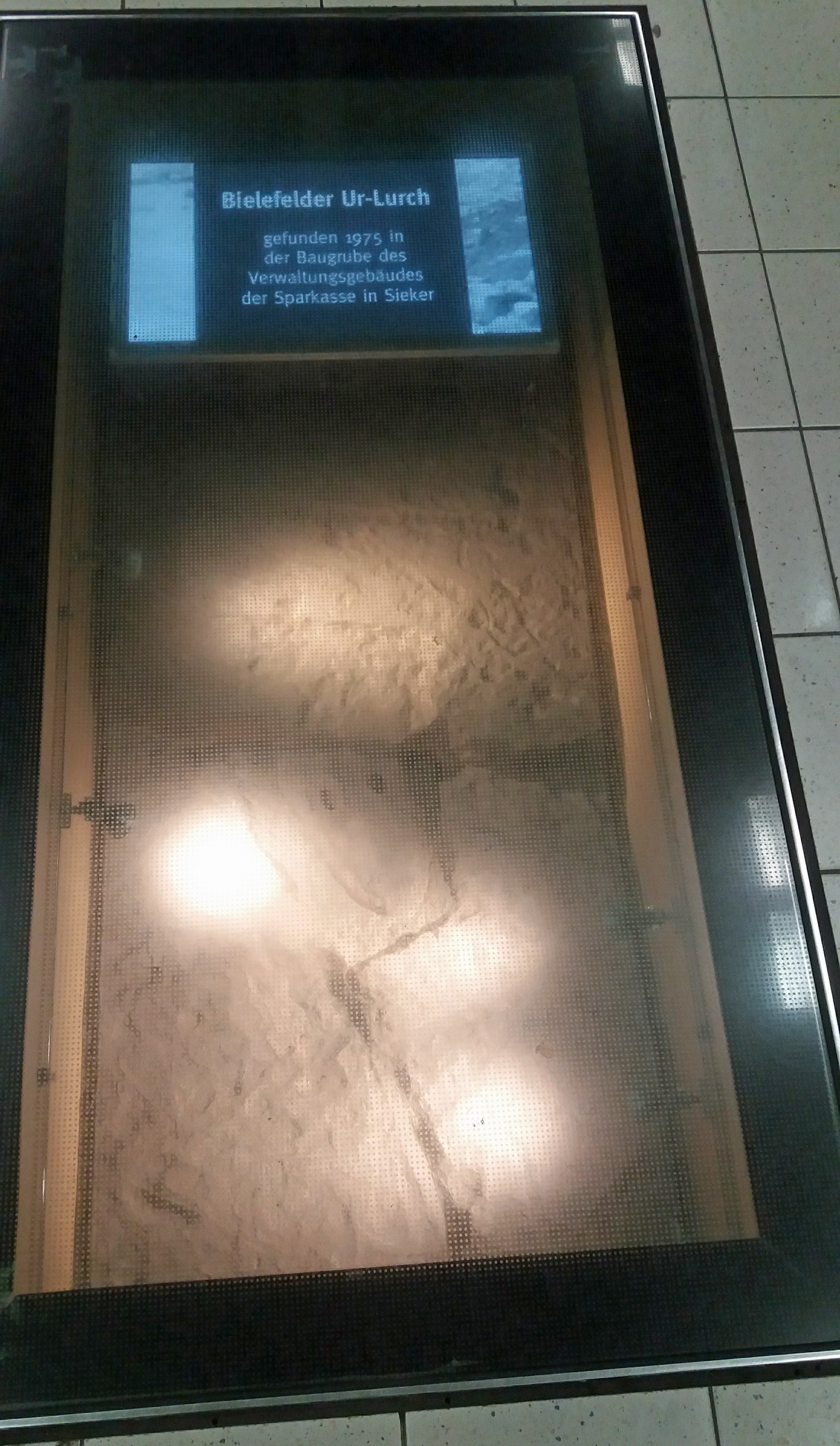
Showcase in a Bielefeld Stadtbahn station

=== Showcases in the city ===
Under the heading "Verdammt lang her …" ("long long ago"), the museum shows casts of centerpiece objects in underground stations of the Bielefeld Stadtbahn. The installation was realised in 2006 when the museum celebrated its 100-year anniversary. Showcases in the floor of the stations show casts of fossils such as the temnospondyl Cyclotosaurus buechneri, the ichthyosaur Temnodontosaurus or the Woolly rhinoceros. Large size banners supplement the installation. A drilling core from the time when the subway tunnel was built is shown next to an elevator in one underground station and illustrates the strata of 220 million years of earth history in Bielefeld.

=== Special exhibitions ===
Various special exhibitions (3 to 5 per year) about different topics regularly supplement the permanent exhibition.

== Education ==
The educational work focuses on sustainability in thinking and acting. Its guideline is "We can only protect what we know".

== Friend's association ==
The "Förderverein Naturkundemuseum der Stadt Bielefeld" ("Friends' association of the Natural History Museum of the City of Bielefeld") was founded in 1994. The association financially supports the educational service, the collections, exhibitions and implements an annual lecture series in cooperation with the adult education center. In 2008, the friends association received the environment award of the city of Bielefeld.
