= Barbatteiidae =

Barbatteiidae Temporal range: Maastrichtian 72–69 Ma

Scientific classification
- Kingdom: Animalia
- Phylum: Chordata
- Class: Reptilia
- Order: Squamata
- Clade: Teiioidea
- Family: †Barbatteiidae; Codrea et al, 2017

Genera
- †Barbatteius; †Oardasaurus

Extinct family of reptiles

Barbatteiidae is an extinct family of lizards, endemic to the paleoisland Hațeg Island in the Tethys Ocean during the final stages of the Cretaceous, In what is now Romania. It contains two monotypic genera, Barbatteius and Oardasaurus, alongside some indeterminate material. It appears to be closely related to modern teiids and the Early Cretaceous lizard genus Meyasaurus.
