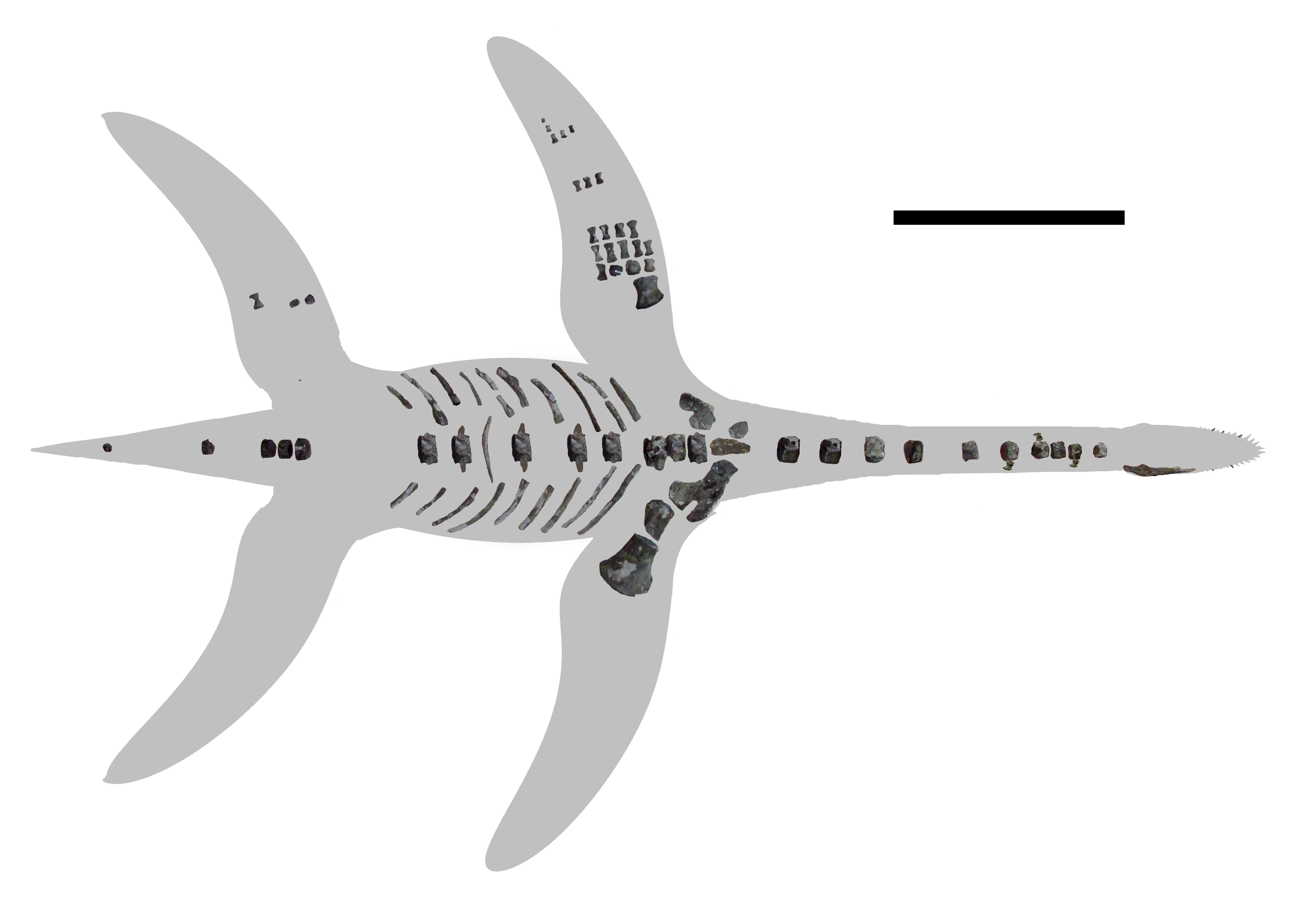
- Arminisaurus schuberti skeleton, Naturkunde-Museum, Bielefeld

Scientific classification
- Domain: Eukaryota
- Kingdom: Animalia
- Phylum: Chordata
- Class: Reptilia
- Superorder: †Sauropterygia
- Order: †Plesiosauria
- Family: †Pliosauridae
- Genus: †Arminisaurus; Sachs & Kear, 2017

Type species
- †Arminisaurus schuberti Sachs & Kear, 2017

= Arminisaurus =

Arminisaurus Temporal range: Early Jurassic, 190–182 Ma

Extinct genus of reptiles

Arminisaurus (meaning "lizard of Arminius") is a genus of pliosaurid plesiosaur that lived during the Lower Jurassic in present-day Germany. With Westphaliasaurus and Cryonectes, Arminisaurus is only the third plesiosaurian taxon that was described from the Pliensbachian stage. The holotype and only known specimen is a fragmentary skeleton (about 40 percent complete), comprising an incomplete lower jaw, teeth, vertebrae and elements from the pectoral girdle and the paddles. The animal had an estimated body length of 3–4 metres (9.8–13.1 ft).

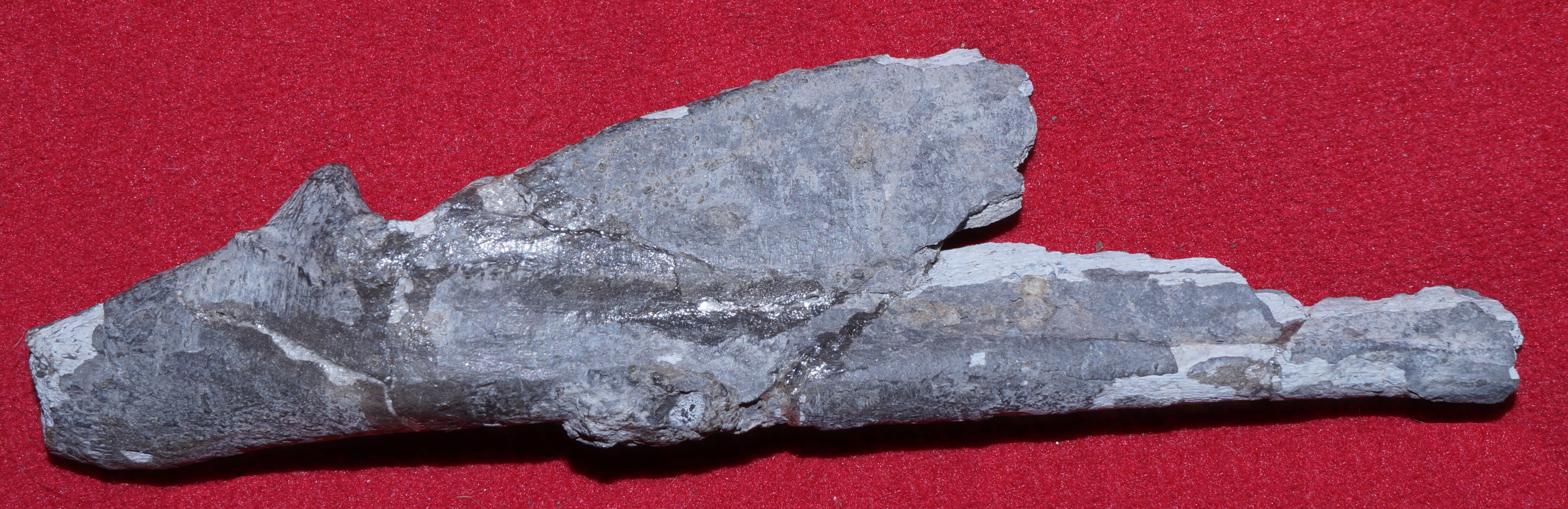
Fragmentary lower jaw of Arminisaurus schuberti

== Discovery and naming ==
The holotype was discovered in the early 1980s by the Hannover-based fossil collector Lothar Schulz in the now abandoned clay pit Beukenhorst II, located in the Bielefeld district of Jöllenbeck. The specimen was later given to amateur palaeontologist Siegfried Schubert who transferred it to the Naturkunde-Museum Bielefeld in 2015 (accession number: NAMU ES/jl 36052).

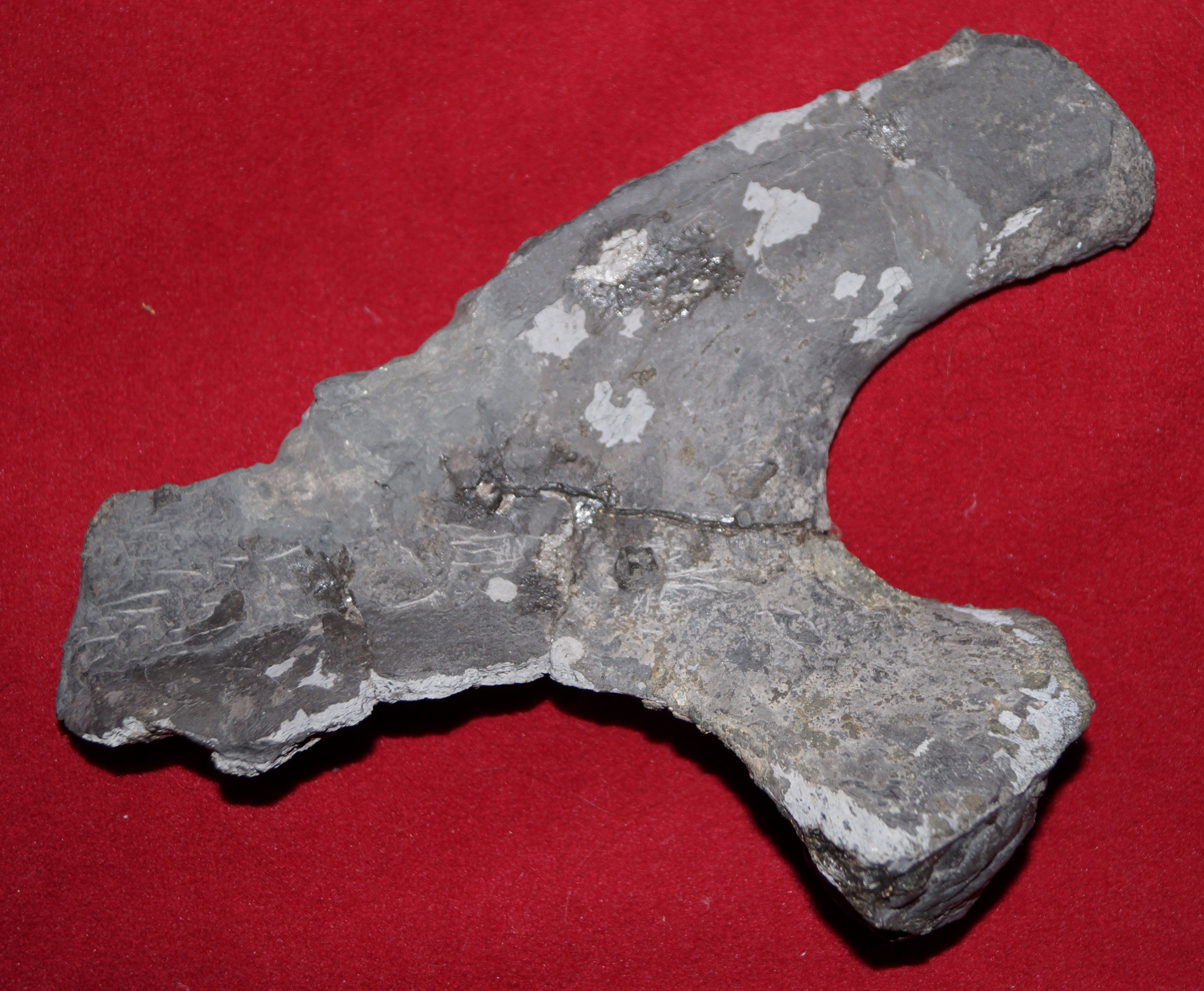
Right scapula of Arminisaurus schuberti

Arminisaurus schuberti was described in 2018 by Sven Sachs and Benjamin Kear. The generic name Arminisaurus refers to Arminius, chieftain of the Cherusci tribe who defeated three Roman legions in the Battle of the Teutoburg Forest in 9 AD and is a homage to the region where the specimen was found. The species name schuberti honours Siegfried Schubert for his contributions (including numerous scientific publications), enhancing the knowledge of the geology of the Bielefeld region.

== Classification ==
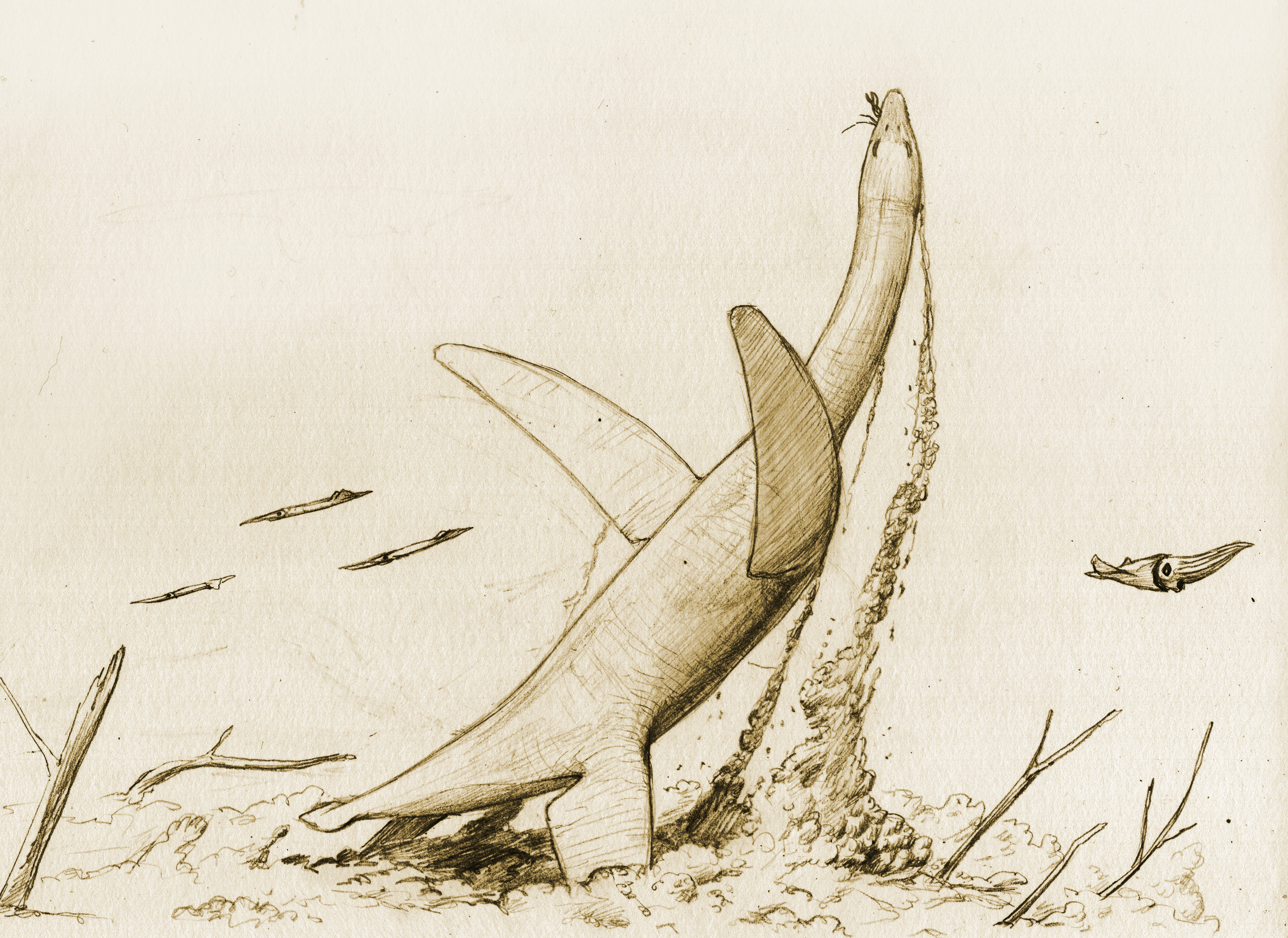
Arminisaurus in its natural environment

A cladistic analysis found Arminisaurus schuberti to be a member of the family Pliosauridae, a globally distributed plesiosaurian clade that is known from the Early Jurassic to the early Late Cretaceous. Arminisaurus was a basal pliosaurid and differs from other members of the clade by a combination of characters found in the mandible, the neck vertebrae and the scapula. These characters are shared with the plesiosaurian group Leptocleidia that occurred about 50 million years later in time.

The following cladogram by Sachs and Kear in 2017 shows the presumed relationships with related pliosaurids:

- - Thalassiodracon
  - - - - OUMNH J.28585
        - - Hauffiosaurus longirostris
          - - Hauffiosaurus tomistomimus
            - Hauffiosaurus zanoni
    - - Attenborosaurus
      - - - Arminisaurus
          - Gallardosaurus
        - derived Pliosauridae
