= Varanus mokrensis =

Varanus mokrensis Temporal range: Early Miocene

Scientific classification
- Kingdom: Animalia
- Phylum: Chordata
- Class: Reptilia
- Order: Squamata
- Suborder: Anguimorpha
- Family: Varanidae
- Genus: Varanus
- Species: V. mokrensis

Binomial name
- Varanus mokrensis Ivanov et al., 2018

Extinct lizard

Varanus mokrensis is an extinct species of Varanus that inhabited what is today the Czech Republic during the Early Miocene.
