= Norisophis =

Norisophis Temporal range: Cenomanian

Scientific classification
- Kingdom: Animalia
- Phylum: Chordata
- Class: Reptilia
- Order: Squamata
- Clade: Ophidia
- Genus: †Norisophis
- Species: †N. begaa

Binomial name
- †Norisophis begaa Klein et al., 2017

Extinct genus of basal snake

Norisophis is an extinct monotypic genus of basal snake that lived in North Africa during the Cenomanian stage of the Late Cretaceous epoch.

== Etymology ==
The generic name Norisophis derives from the Greek words norís and ophis, respectively meaning early and snake. The specific epithet of the type species, Norisophis begaa, refers to the desert oasis of Begaa.
