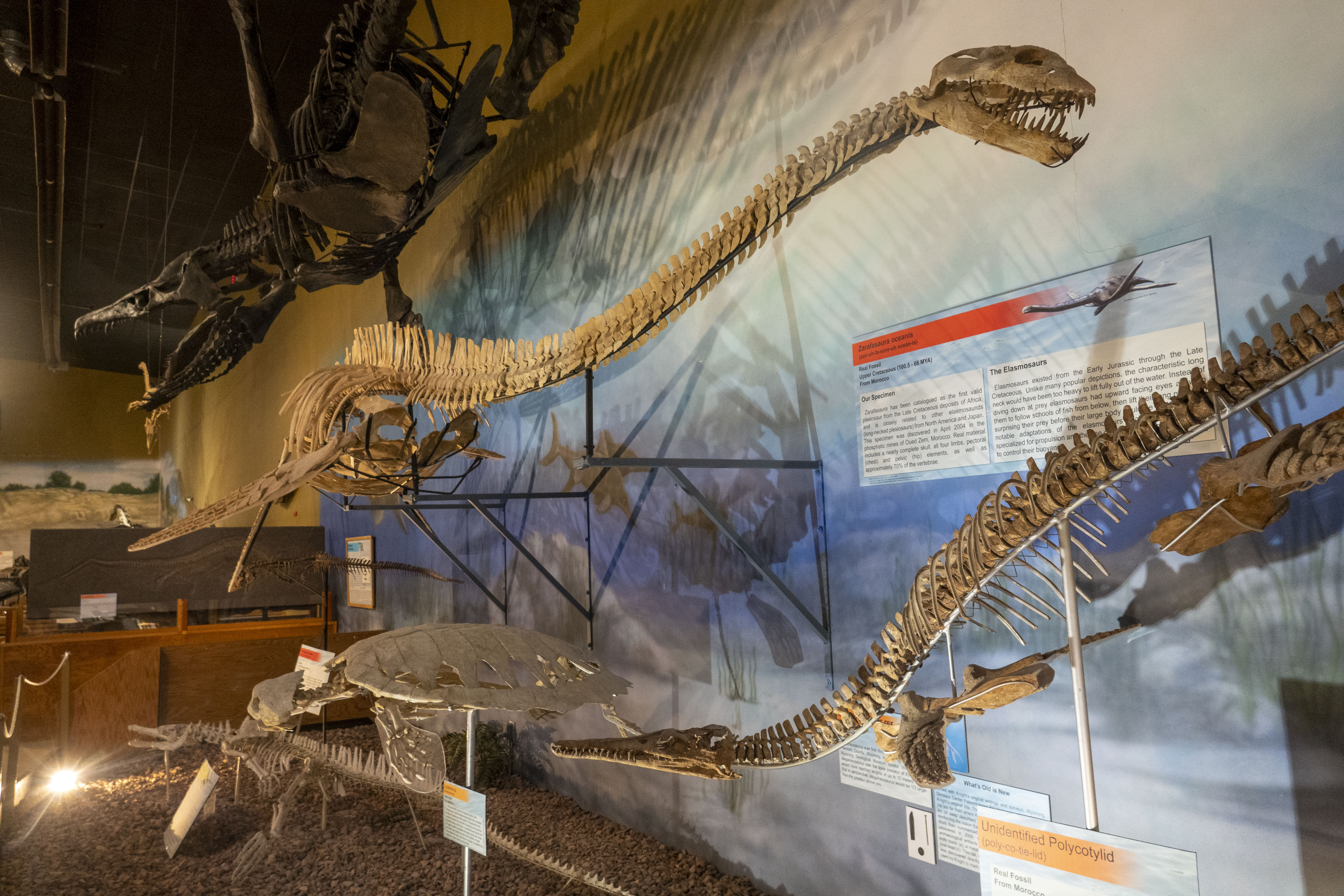
- Mounted skeleton (above), Wyoming Dinosaur Center

Scientific classification
- Kingdom: Animalia
- Phylum: Chordata
- Class: Reptilia
- Superorder: †Sauropterygia
- Order: †Plesiosauria
- Superfamily: †Plesiosauroidea
- Family: †Elasmosauridae
- Genus: †Zarafasaura; Vincent et al., 2011
- Species: †Z. oceanis

Binomial name
- †Zarafasaura oceanis Vincent et al., 2011

= Zarafasaura =

Zarafasaura Temporal range: Late Cretaceous, Maastrichtian

Extinct genus of reptiles

Zarafasaura is an extinct genus of elasmosaurid known from the Ouled Abdoun Basin of Morocco. As a relatively small elasmosaur, it would have measured around 3–4 metres (9.8–13.1 ft) long and weighed about 100 kilograms (220 lb).

== Discovery ==
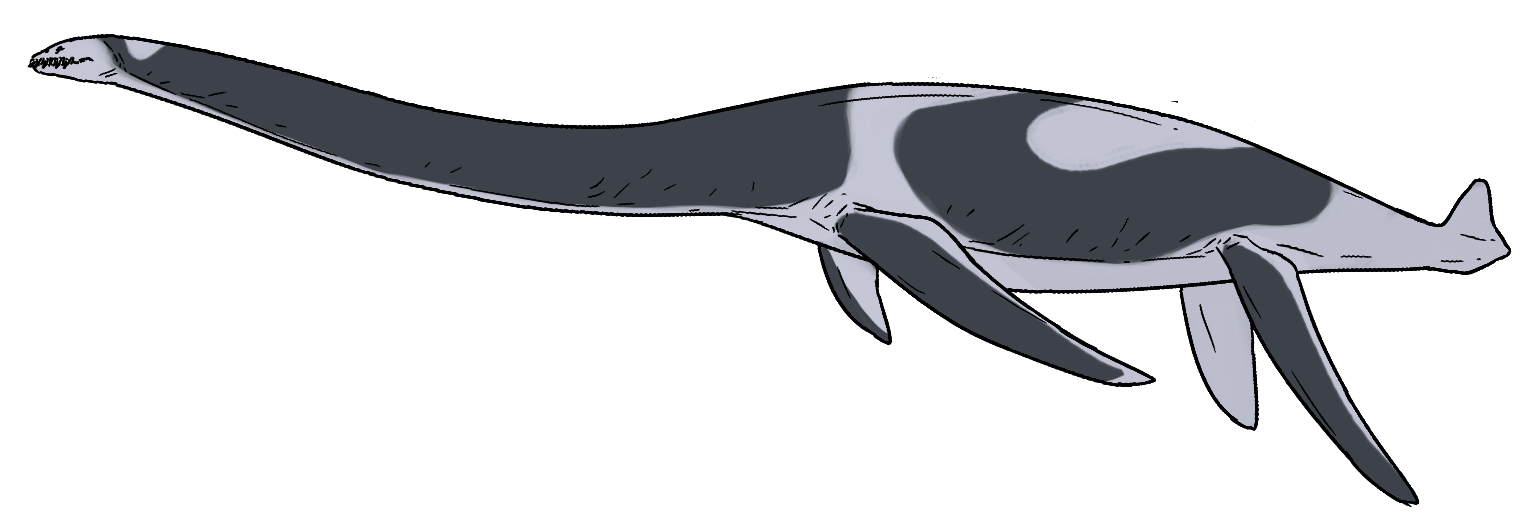
Life restoration

Zarafasaura was first named by Peggy Vincent, Nathalie Bardet, Xabier Pereda Suberbiola, Baâdi Bouya, Mbarek Amaghzaz and Saïd Meslouh in 2011 and the type species is Zarafasaura oceanis. The generic name is derived from zarafa (زرافة), Arabic for "giraffe" (it refers to the name given by the local population to the plesiosaurs found in the phosphates) and saurus, Greek for "lizard". The specific name is derived from oceanis, Latin for "daughter of the sea".

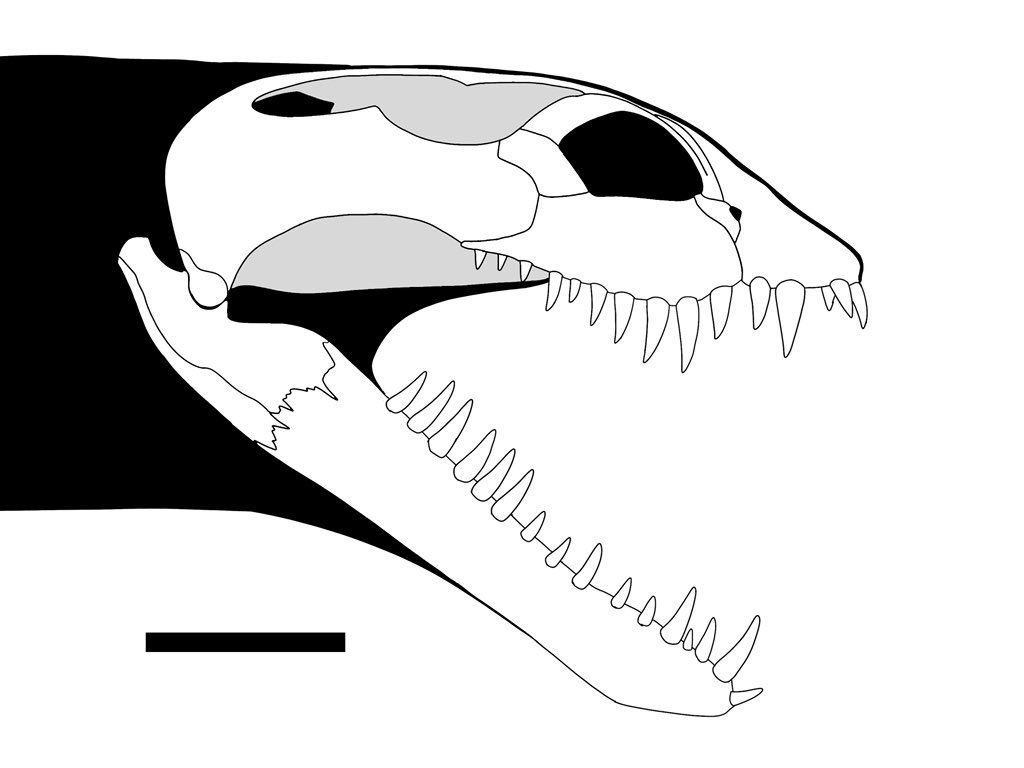
Skull diagram

The holotype of Zarafasaura, OCP-DEK/GE 315, consists of an articulated incomplete dorsoventrally crushed skull and mandible and from the paratype OCP-DEK/GE 456, a complete mandible. It was collected in the Sidi Daoui area, from the Upper CIII level of the upper Cretaceous (latest Maastrichtian stage) Phosphates of Morocco. In 2013, a second specimen, WDC CMC-01, was found to have a more complete skull with previously unknown postcranial elements such as the forefins, hindfins, vertebrae, pectoral and pelvic material.

In 2017, a specimen of Zarafasaura oceanis was about to be auctioned off at Hôtel Drouot (Paris). The auction house valued it at about €450,000 but the sale was halted and the specimen ultimately returned to Morocco.

== See also ==
- List of plesiosaur genera
- Timeline of plesiosaur research
