= Hispaniasaurus =

Hispaniasaurus Temporal range: Middle Triassic, Ladinian

Scientific classification
- Kingdom: Animalia
- Phylum: Chordata
- Class: Reptilia
- Superorder: †Sauropterygia
- Order: †Nothosauroidea
- Genus: †Hispaniasaurus Marquez-Aliaga et al., 2017

Type species
- †Hispaniasaurus cranioelongatus Marquez-Aliaga et al., 2017

Extinct genus of reptiles

Hispaniasaurus is a genus of extinct marine reptiles with nothosauroid affinities. It lived during the Middle Triassic (Ladinian) in Spain. The type species, Hispaniasaurus cranioelongatus, was named in 2017. The holotype specimen, part of a cranium was found in the Cañete Formation.
