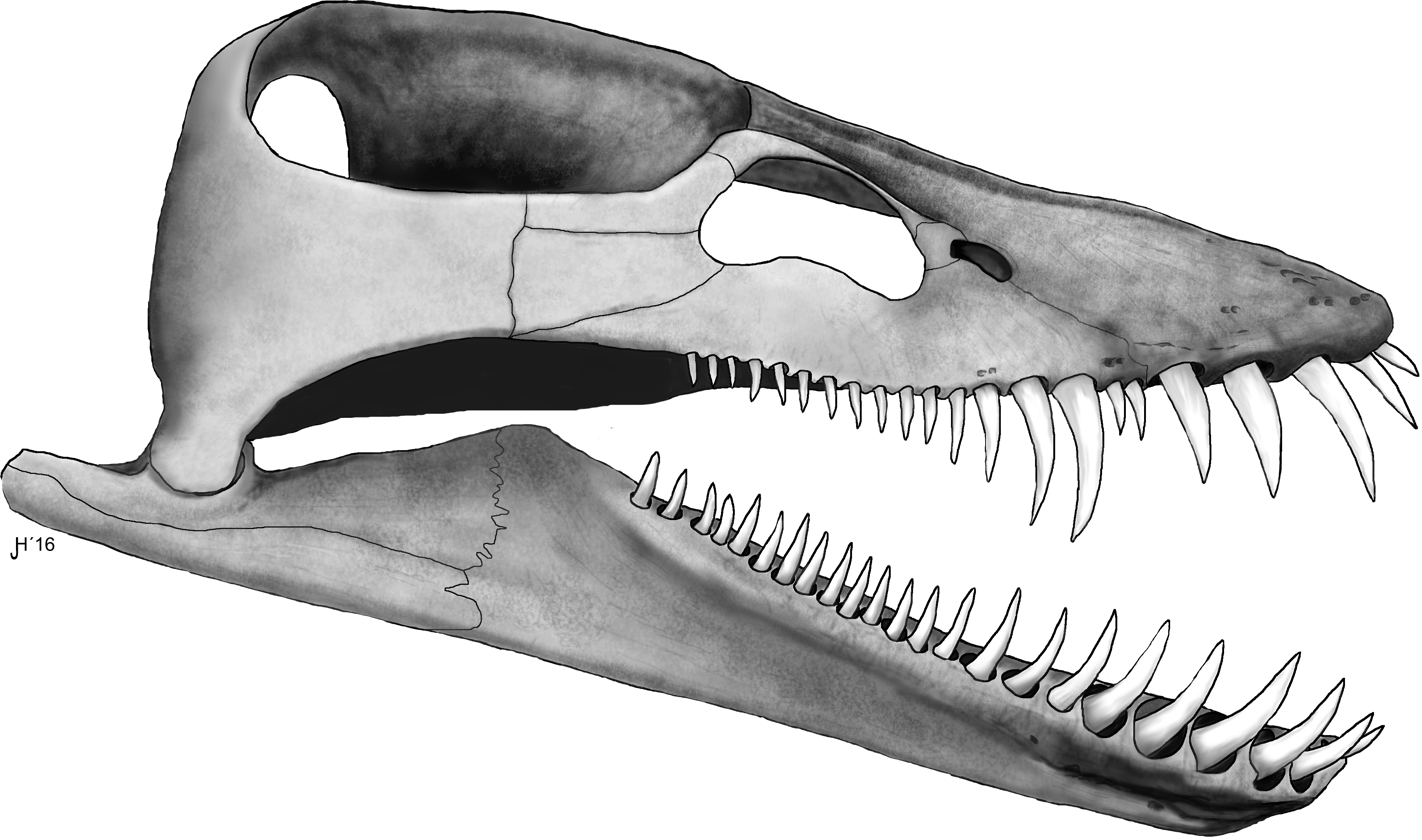
- Lagenanectes richterae, skull reconstruction in right lateral view

Scientific classification
- Kingdom: Animalia
- Phylum: Chordata
- Class: Reptilia
- Superorder: †Sauropterygia
- Order: †Plesiosauria
- Superfamily: †Plesiosauroidea
- Family: †Elasmosauridae
- Genus: †Lagenanectes
- Species: †L. richterae

Binomial name
- †Lagenanectes richterae Sachs, Hornung & Kear, 2017

= Lagenanectes =

Lagenanectes Temporal range: Hauterivian–Barremian

Genus of reptiles (fossil)

Lagenanectes is a genus of elasmosaurid plesiosaur from the Lower Cretaceous, found in Lower Saxony, Germany. The only species, Lagenanectes richterae, was first described in 2017, and is regarded as one of the best-preserved plesiosaur fossils from this geological age in Europe. Lagenanectes is one of the earliest elasmosaurids. The holotype is an incomplete skeleton, comprising large parts of the skull, some neck and tail vertebrae as well as ribs and part of the limbs. A length of about 8 meters (26 feet) has been estimated.

== Discovery and naming ==
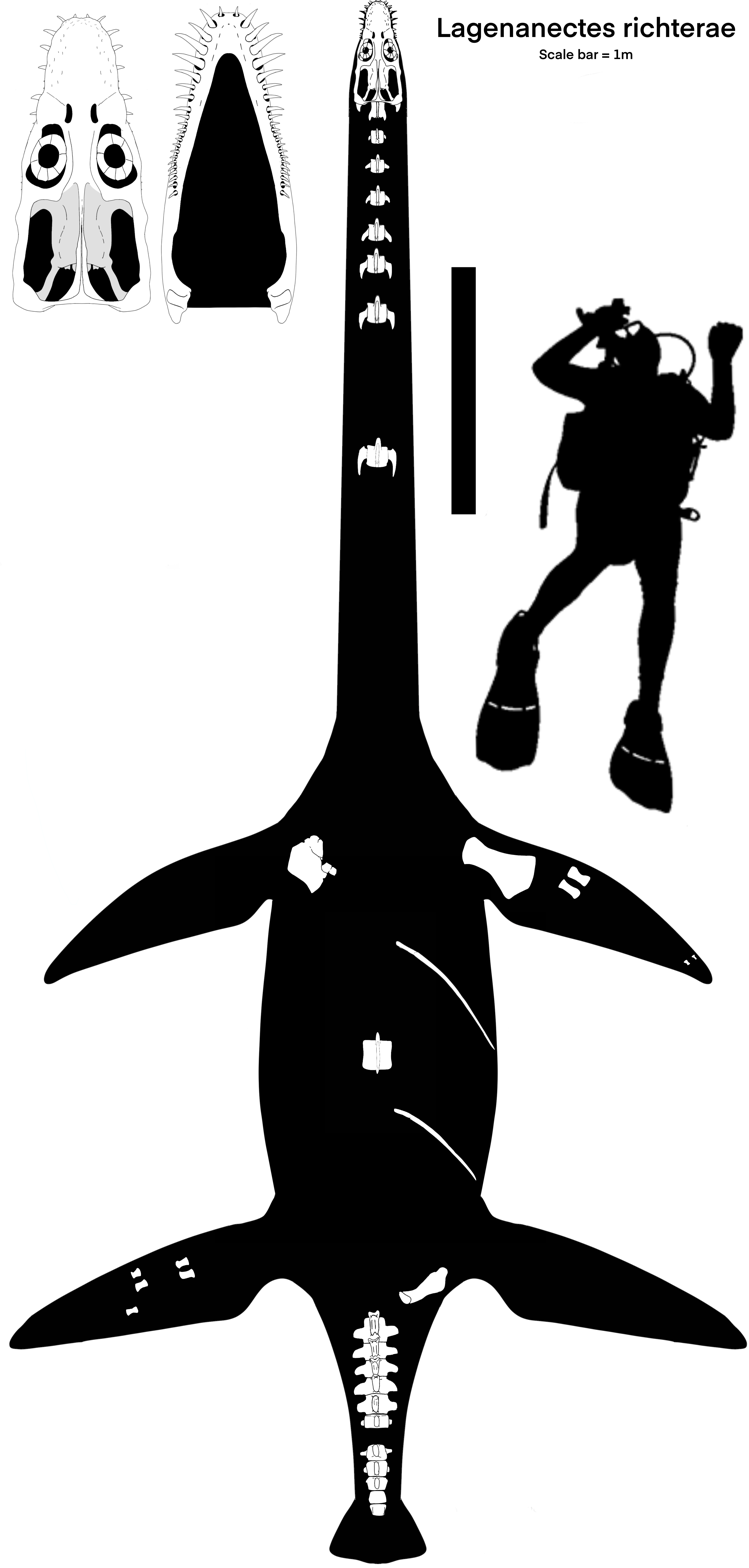
Skeletal diagram

The well-preserved holotype specimen of Lagenanectes richterae (specimen number BGR Ma 13328) was found in the disused Moorberg clay pit near Sarstedt by private collectors in 1964. The exact horizon is unknown (the age of the fossils might be lower Hauterivian to lower Barremian, but most probably is upper Hauterivian). The fossils were later given to the Geological Survey at Hannover, where Professor Sickenberg identified them as elasmosaurid remains. They have subsequently been transferred to the Lower Saxony State Museum in Hannover, where part of the specimen is now on display. However, it was not until some 50 years later, in 2017, that Sven Sachs, Jahn J. Hornung and Benjamin P. Kear studied the fossil in detail and erected Lagenanectes as a new, monotypic genus.

The name Lagenanectes literally means "Leine swimmer" and refers to both, the Leine river which passes Sarstedt, and to the swimming life style of this marine reptile. The specific name richterae honours Annette Richter, chief curator of the Natural History department at the Lower Saxony State Museum in Hannover, for her contributions to the palaeontological exploration of Lower Saxony.

== Description ==
The holotype of Lagenanectes richterae was a fully grown individual. This is indicated by the ossification of both the cranial bones and the vertebrae and neural arches.

The front part of the lower jaw of Lagenanectes richterae shows some anatomical features which are unique in plesiosaurs (autapomorphies): The alveols are placed sidewards and a platform is present on the underside of the lower jaw that bears prominent dents. The skull of Lagenanectes shows a rounded snout that is accompanied by some grooves on the upper side. These grooves may have accommodated electroreceptors to locate the prey. The neck vertebrae of Lagenanectes are square-shaped and lack a notch on the lower side of the articular surfaces of the vertebral centra, which is characteristic for other elasmosaurs.

== Classification ==
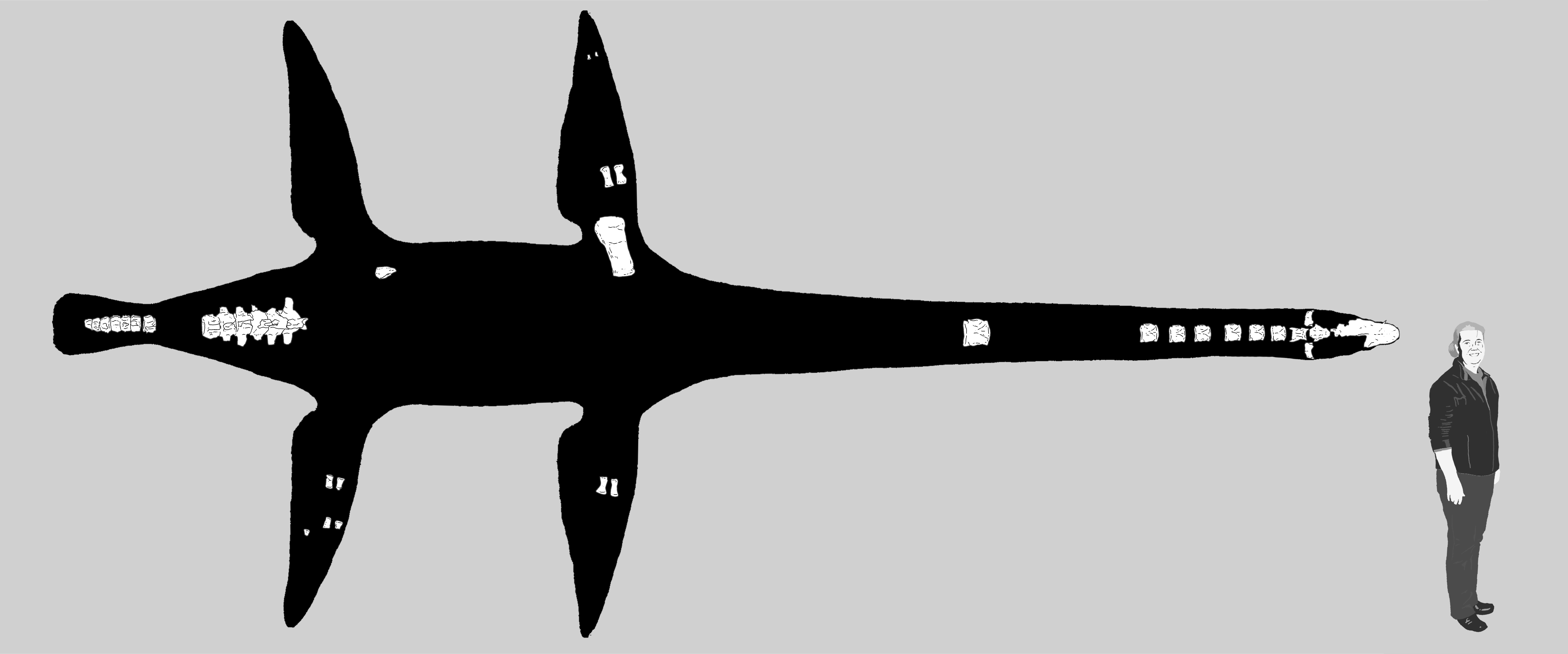
Diagram showing most of the preserved elements attributed to Lagenanectes richterae; Annette Richter, for whom the species is named, is shown for scale

The study by Sachs and colleagues demonstrated that Lagenanectes richterae was an early member of the elasmosaurids. Following their cladistic analysis, Lagenanectes was in a polytomy with the "Speeton Clay plesiosaur" (a yet undescribed plesiosaur from the Hauterivian of England) and with Callawayasaurus from the Aptian of Colombia.

== Pathologies ==
The occiput and the first neck vertebra of the holotype of Lagenanectes richterae show pathological alterations of the bony structure. They may have been caused by an infection.

== Gallery ==
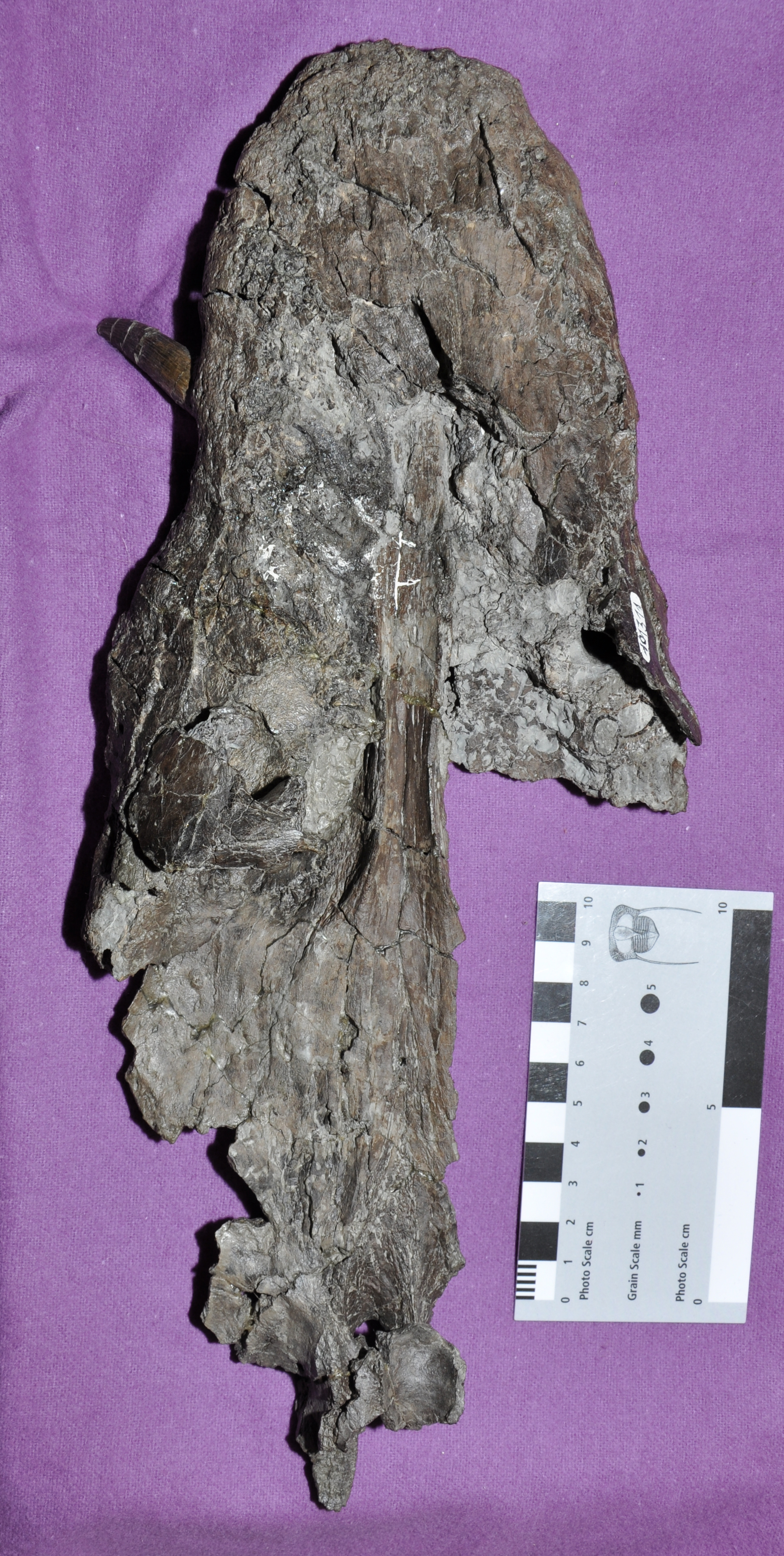
Skull of Lagenanectes seen from above

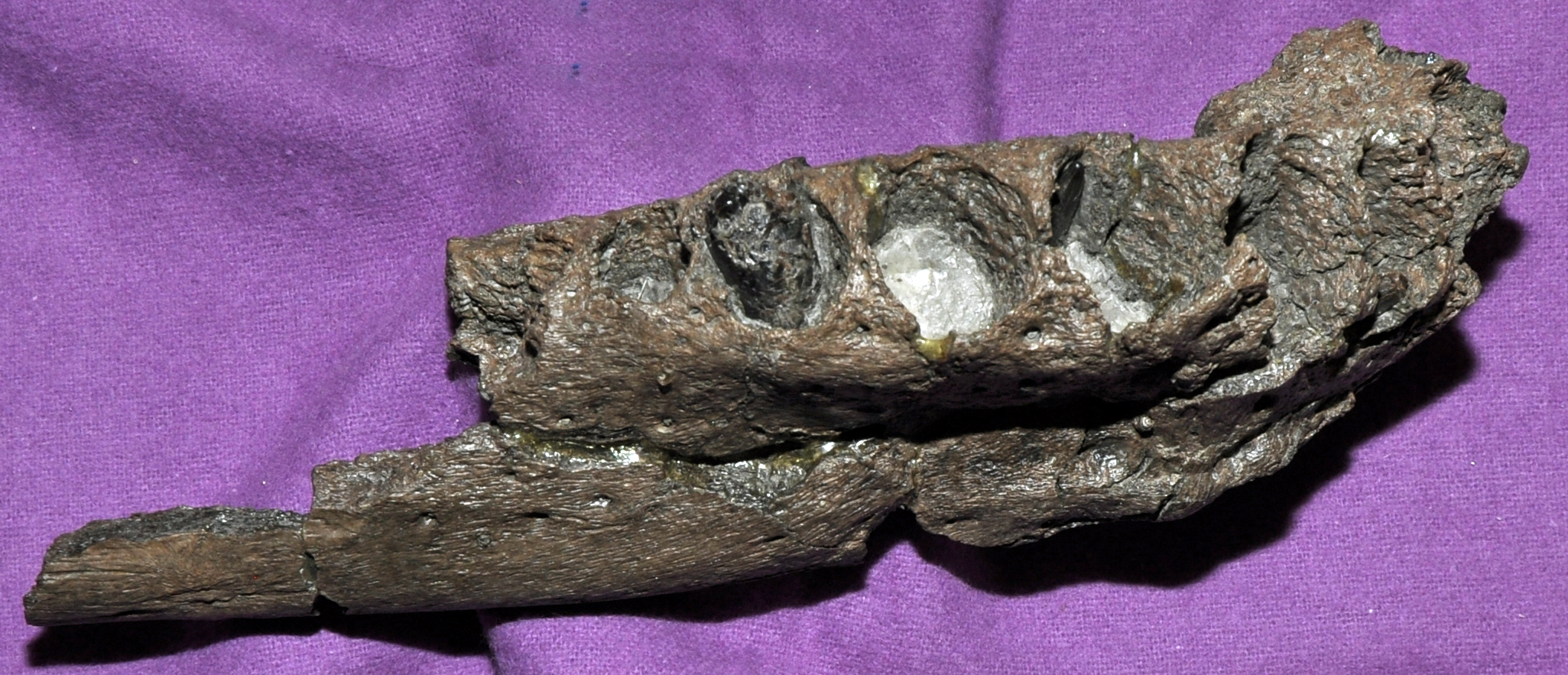
Lower jaw of Lagenanectes richterae in side view

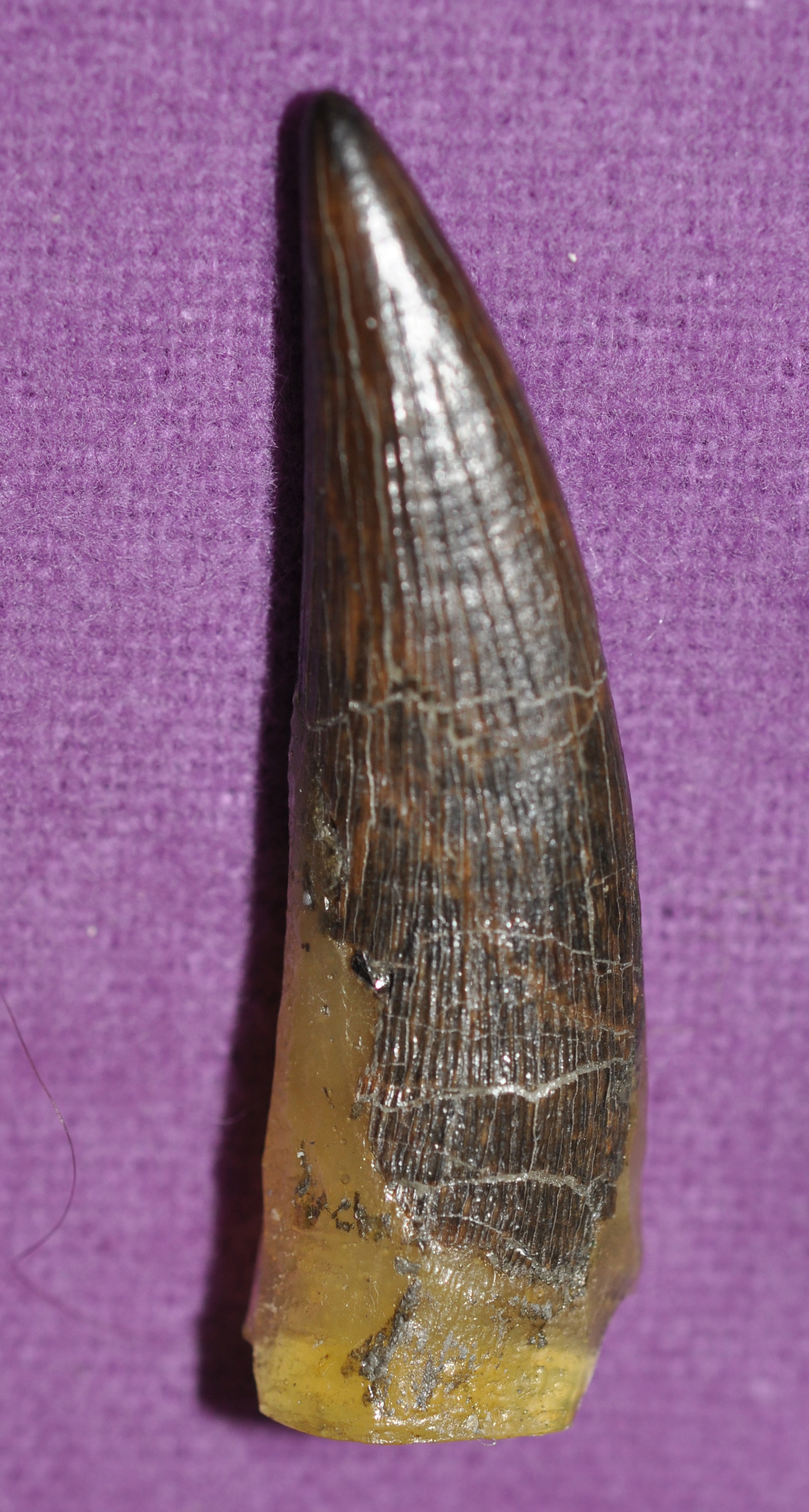
Tooth of Lagenanectes richterae

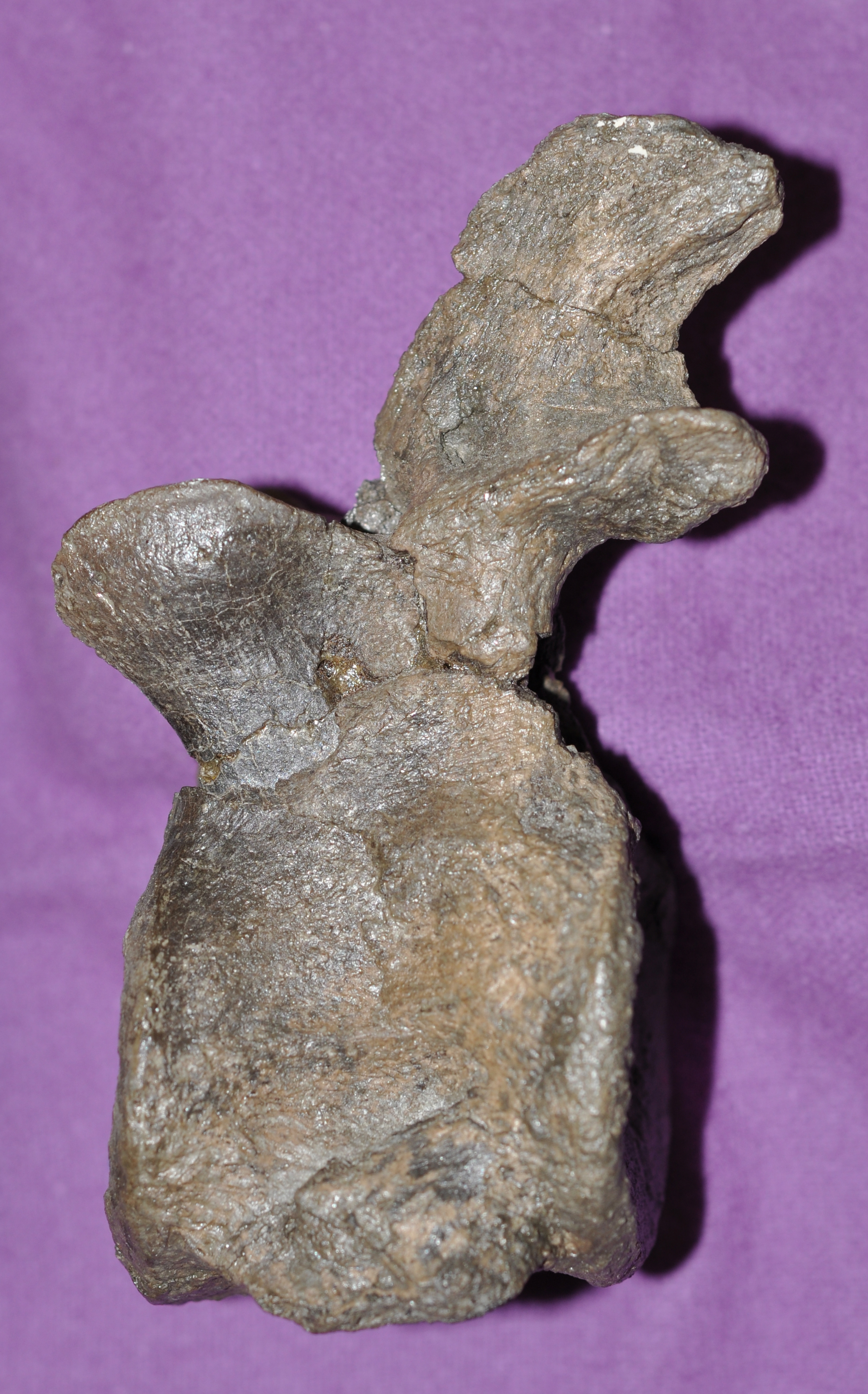
Neck vertebra of Lagenanectes richterae in side view
