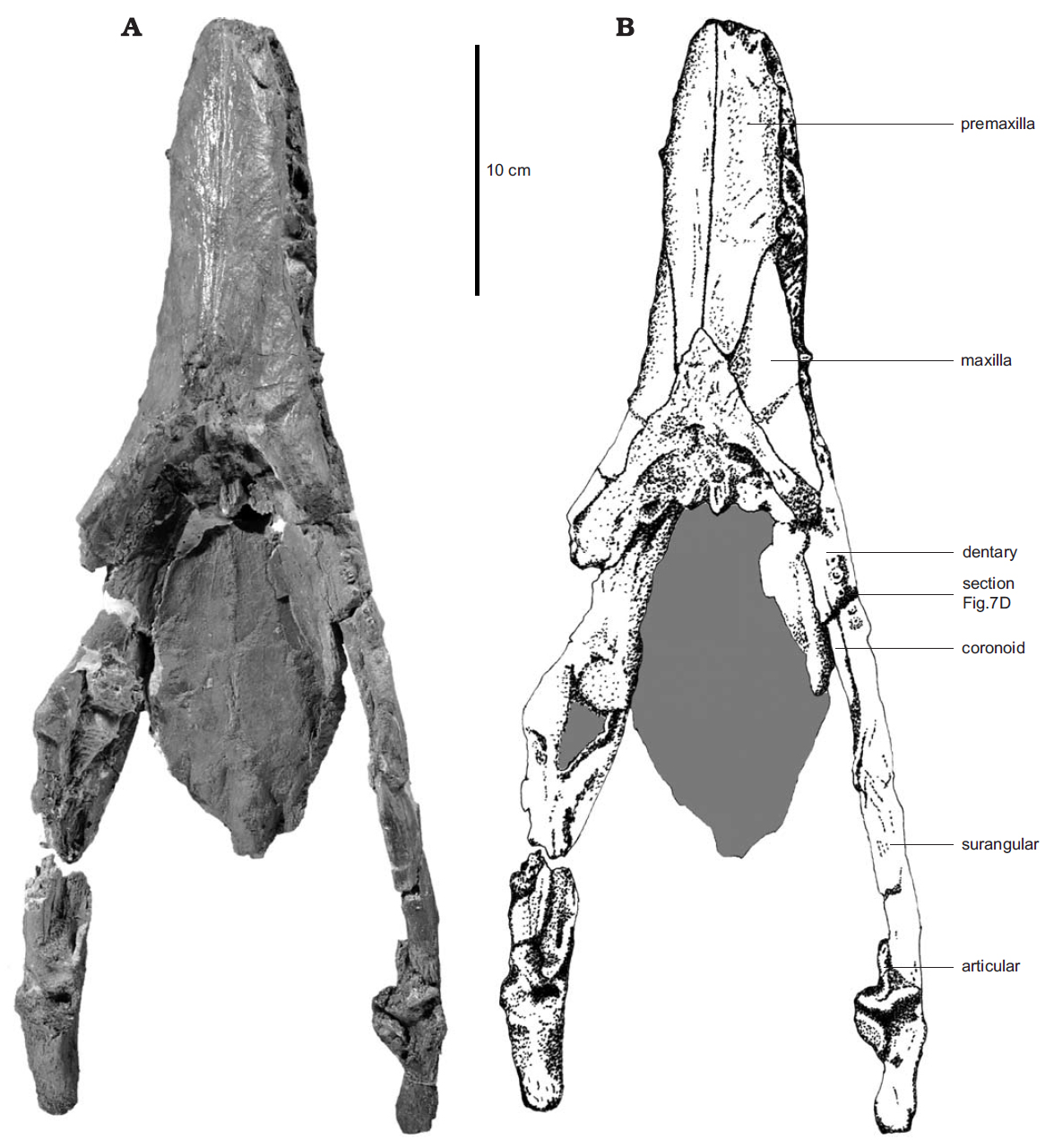
- Holotype

Scientific classification
- Domain: Eukaryota
- Kingdom: Animalia
- Phylum: Chordata
- Class: Reptilia
- Superorder: †Sauropterygia
- Order: †Plesiosauria
- Family: †Pliosauridae
- Genus: †Cryonectes; Vincent, Bardet & Mattioli, 2012

Type species
- †Cryonectes neustriacus Vincent, Bardet & Mattioli, 2012

= Cryonectes =

Cryonectes Temporal range: Early Jurassic, 185–183 Ma

Extinct genus of reptiles

Cryonectes is an extinct genus of pliosaurid plesiosaurian known from the Early Jurassic of Normandy, northern France.

== Discovery ==
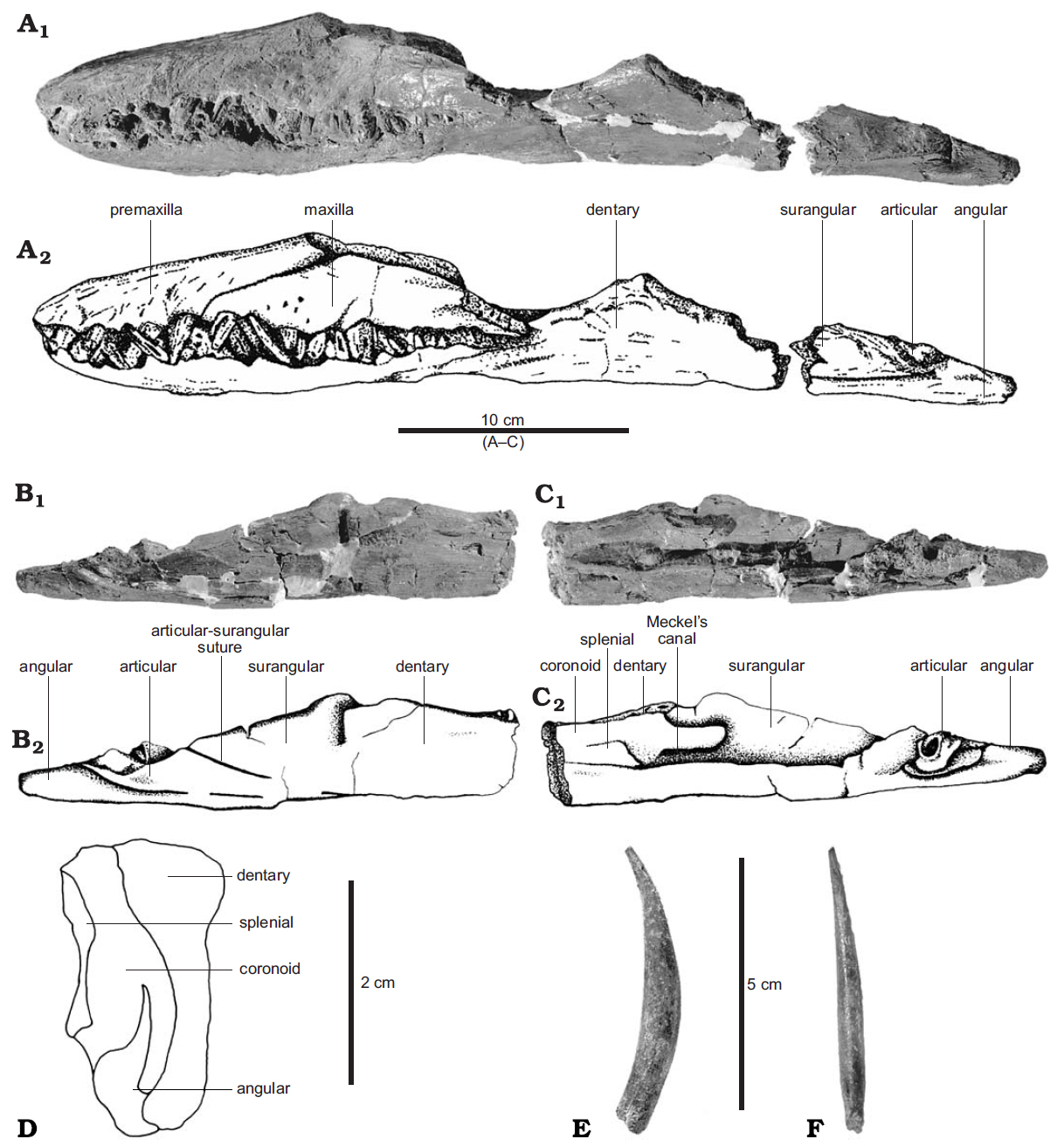
Holotype jaws

Cryonectes is known only from the holotype MAE 2007.1.1(J), a partial skull and articulated mandible, and ten associated vertebrae. It was collected in the 1980s from the Calcaire à Bélemnites Formation of Normandy, dating to the latest Pliensbachian stage of the late Early Jurassic, about 185-183 million years ago. It was found in the Roche-Blain quarry, located in the commune of Fresney-le-Puceux near the city of Laize-la-Ville, south of Caen. In 2007, it was accessioned in the collection of the Musée de l’Agglomération d’Elbeuff at Elbeuf−sur−Seine.

== Description ==
Cryonectes is a moderate-sized pliosaurid, as its skull has a length of 47 cm (19 in). The specimen when discovered was prepared first with acid, which damaged some parts, especially the teeth, which are now broken and lack enamel. The complete mandible and the skull are in occlusion with teeth in situ and one separated and almost complete tooth is also known. The premaxillae and maxillae are partially preserved and the most important part of the palate is preserved separate from the skull. The ten associated vertebrae are preserved in a non-natural sequence, nine being cervical, while the last one is indeterminable. Distinct neurocentral sutures are visible on all vertebrae preserving neural arches, except on the ninth vertebra, which presents a closed suture. Therefore, Cryonectes is at a relatively early stage in ontogenetic development. The ninth vertebra suggests that it was probably a subadult individual.

Cryonectes is characterized by a unique combination of characters including a very slight constriction between premaxillae and maxillae, its snout is greatly elongated and the mandible has a long symphysis bearing seven tooth position and retaining a ventral mandibular ridge.

== Phylogeny ==
A cladistic analysis performed by Peggy Vincent, Nathalie Bardet and Emanuela Mattioli found it to be basal to Pliosaurus, Peloneustes and other pliosaurids.

== Etymology ==
Cryonectes was first named by Peggy Vincent, Nathalie Bardet and Emanuela Mattioli in 2012 and the type species is Cryonectes neustriacus. The generic name is derived from kryos, Greek for "cold", and nektris (nektes), for "swimmer", and refers to the cool climatic conditions that prevailed during the uppermost Pliensbachian. The specific name is derived from the Frank kingdom of Neustrie which covered northwest France, created after the death of Clovis I.

== See also ==
- List of plesiosaur genera
- Timeline of plesiosaur research
