= Sphingopus =

Sphingopus Temporal range: 250–228 Ma

Trace fossil classification
- Domain: Eukaryota
- Kingdom: Animalia
- Phylum: Chordata
- Ichnofamily: †Parachirotheriidae
- Ichnogenus: †Sphingopus; Demathieu, 1966

Type ichnospecies
- †Sphingopus ferox Demathieu, 1966

Dinosaur footprint

Sphingopus is an ichnogenus of dinosauromorph footprints found in sediments dating to 250 and 228 Ma. The exact species which created the Sphingopus tracks have not been identified.

== Specimens ==
Sphingopus type footprints are known from two locations. Fossils dating 228–245 million years have been recovered from what appears to have been a lagoon in the Grès d'Antully Formation in Saône-et-Loire, France. More recently, older tracks attributed to this form, dating 246–250 million years ago, have been discovered in the Holy Cross Mountains in Poland.
