= Barbatteius =

Barbatteius Temporal range: Maastrichtian, 69 Ma

Scientific classification
- Kingdom: Animalia
- Phylum: Chordata
- Class: Reptilia
- Order: Squamata
- Family: †Barbatteiidae
- Genus: †Barbatteius; Venczel and Codrea, 2016

Type species
- †Barbatteius vremiri Venczel and Codrea, 2016

Extinct genus of lizards

Barbatteius is an extinct genus of lizard from the family Barbatteidae represented by the type species Barbatteius vremiri from the Late Cretaceous of Romania.

== Etymology ==
The name Barbatteius Means "Tegu from the Bărbat River", with "barbat" in reference to the river the fossil was close to and the suffix "teius" in reference to a genus of teiid lizards.

== Description ==
B. vremiri was named in 2016 on the basis of UVB V.440, which consists in fragmentary lower jaws and relatively well preserved skull roofing bones from the Haţeg Basin. Its primary characteristic that differs Barbatteius from other related lizards (such as Teiidae) is having more prominent osteoderms covering the skull roof. It is also large for a mesozoic squamate, with an estimated snout-vent length of 26 centimeters, and a total body length of 80 centimetres (31 in). Barbatteius lived on Haţeg Island during the early Maastrichtian stage and was part of an isolated island fauna. However, its close affinities with teiids from Gondwana and its co-occurrence with paramacellodid and borioteiioid lizards from Euramerica suggests that Haţeg Island was colonized by lizards multiple times from many different areas of the world.

== Ecology ==
Barbatteius probably was included as prey to some carnivores, even if the later were not numerous. Among the predators suggested for Barbatteius vremiri are the Allodaposuchus and Balaur bondoc. Because of its relatively large size, Barbatteius would have less potential predators and could have a wider variety of prey options compared to many modern lizards. Having heterodont dentition without crushing molars, it probably fed on large invertebrates (Such as millipedes and large arachnids), small vertebrates (such as amphibians, smaller lizards, turtle hatchlings and maybe multiturbeculates such as Litovoi). It also could have eaten eggs and hatchlings of dinosaurs such as Magyarosaurus, similar to how large modern teiids such as Salvator merianae are known for eating eggs and hatchlings of several species of bird.

== Classification ==
A phylogenetic analysis conducted by Venczel and Codrea alongside the original description of Barbatteius showed that Barbatteius, and consequently other members of Barbatteiidae, belong to Teiioidea. This placement is supported by the fusion of the frontal bones and by the presence of the prootic bone within the recessus scalae tympani, a structure associated with the inner ear. The analysis also identified several features shared by Barbatteiidae and Teiidae, including the postorbital overlapping the squamosal; the origin of the temporal muscles on the upper portions of the parietals, which are overlapped by the contact between the parietals and ectopterygoid bones; and the presence of a weakly developed shelf on the inner side of the tooth row.
