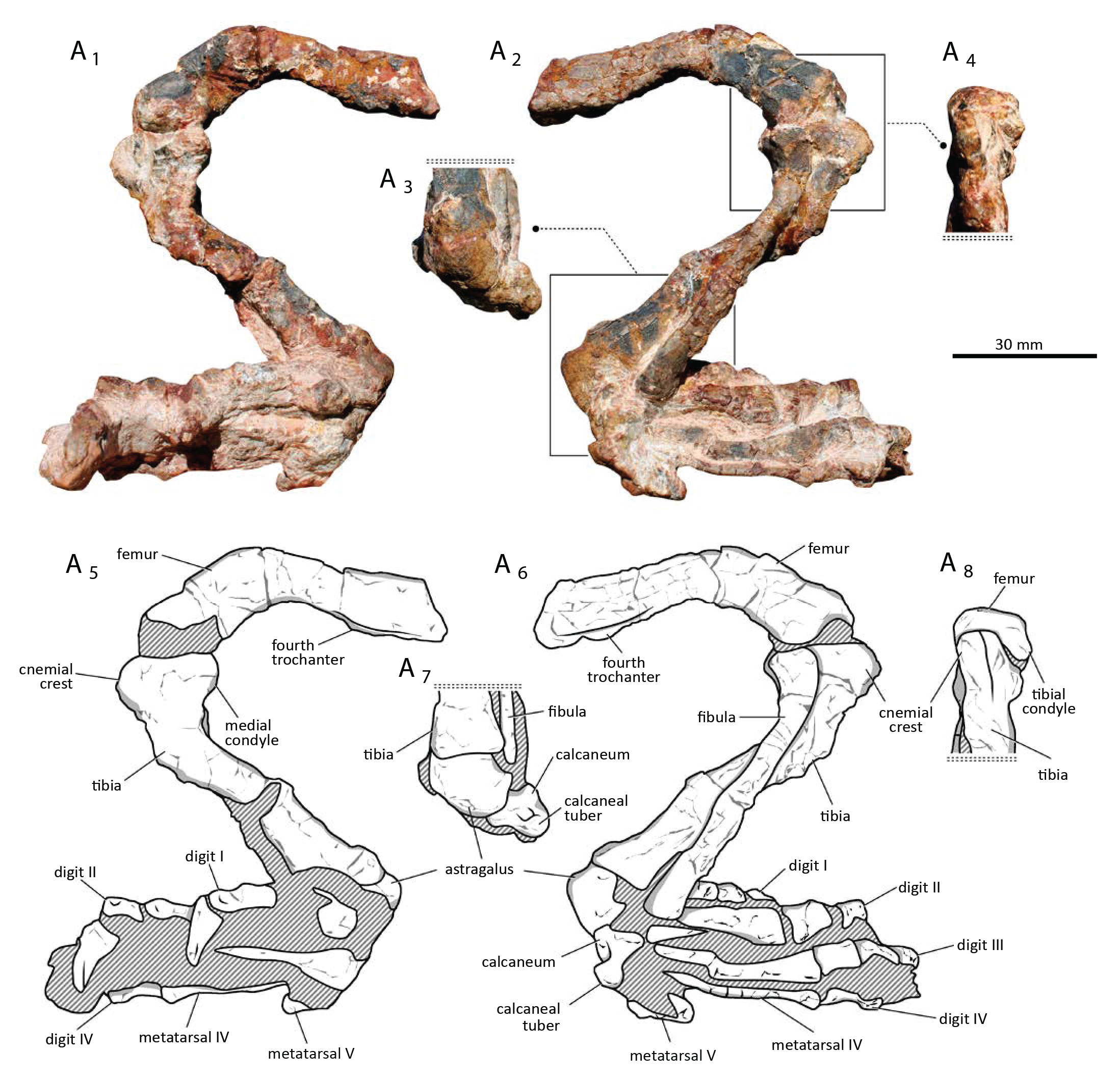
- Holotype specimen
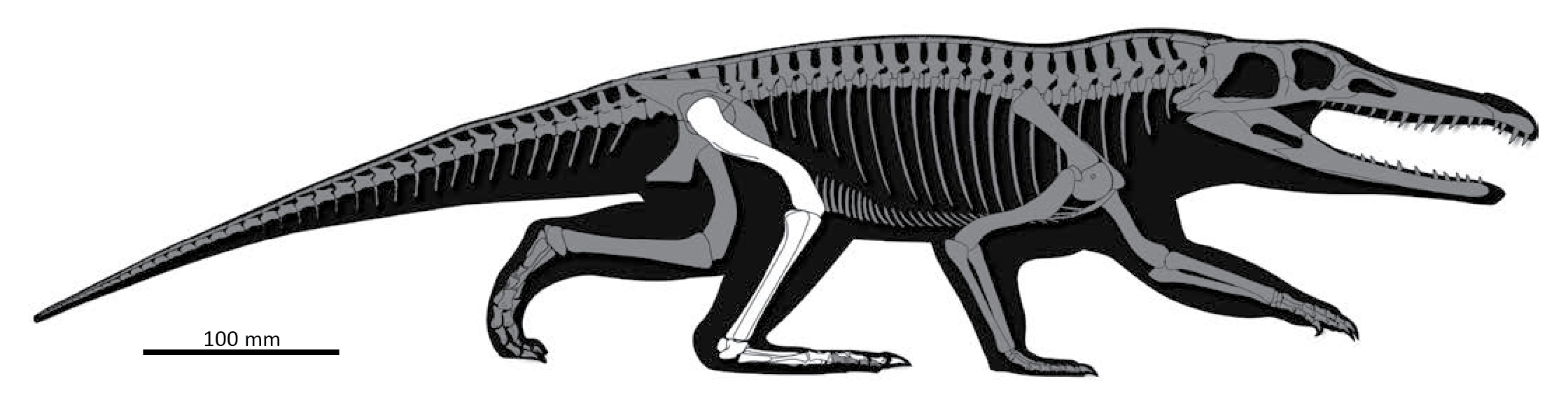
- Skeletal reconstruction with known bones in white

Scientific classification
- Kingdom: Animalia
- Phylum: Chordata
- Class: Reptilia
- Clade: †Proterochampsia
- Family: †Proterochampsidae
- Clade: †Proterochampsinae
- Genus: †Retymaijychampsa; Müller, 2025
- Species: †R. beckerorum

Binomial name
- †Retymaijychampsa beckerorum Müller, 2025

= Retymaijychampsa =

Retymaijychampsa Temporal range: Middle–Late Triassic, Ladinian–early Carnian

Genus of proterochampsid archosauriforms

Retymaijychampsa is an extinct genus of proterochampsid archosauriforms from the Mid–Late Triassic Santa Maria Formation (Paraná Basin) of Brazil. The genus contains a single species, R. beckerorum, known from a complete right hindlimb.

== Discovery and naming ==
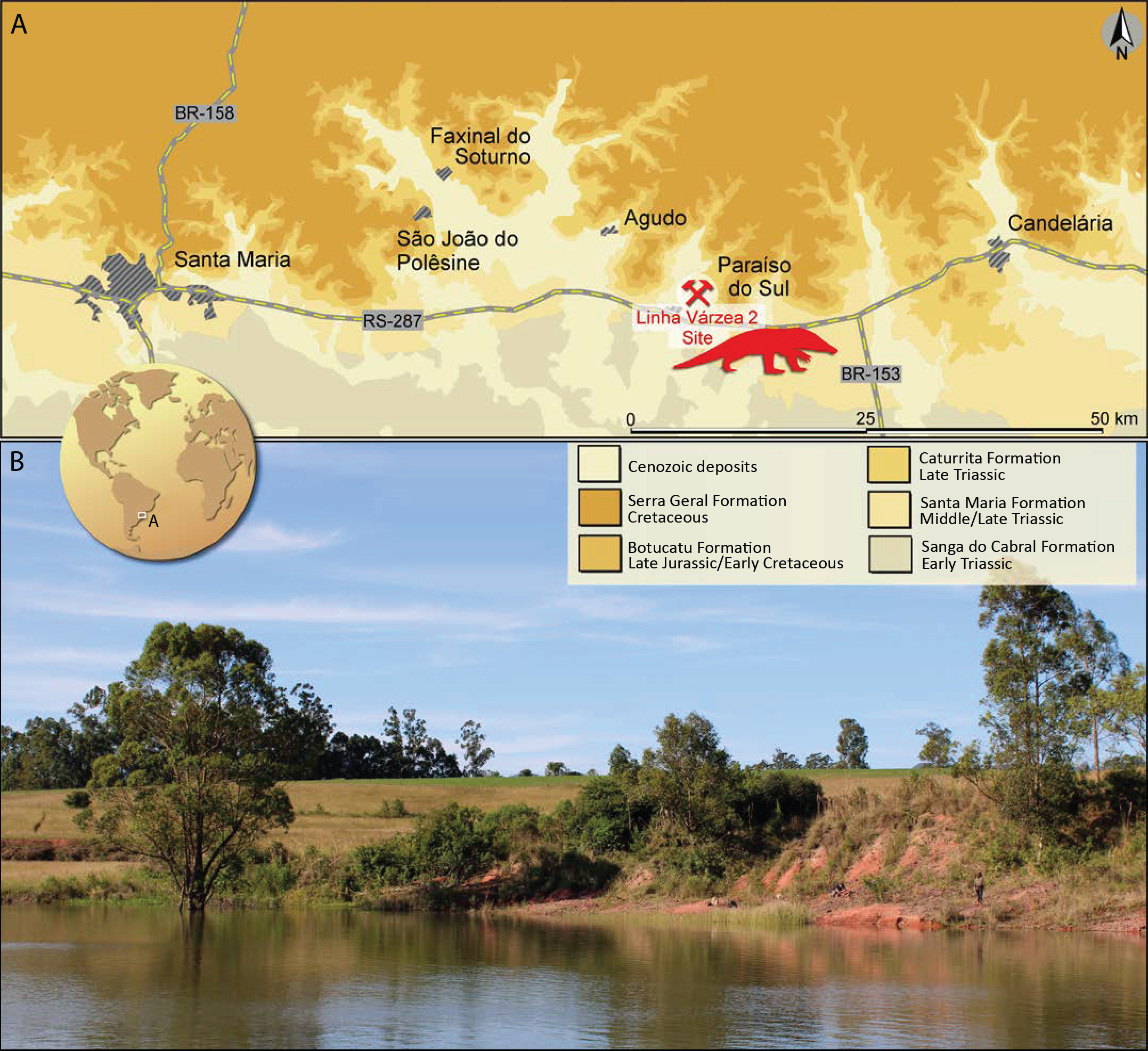
Type locality in Paraíso do Sul, Brazil

The Retymaijychampsa holotype specimen, CAPPA/UFSM 0430, was discovered in outcrops of the Santa Maria Formation ('Linha Várzea 2 site'; Paraná Basin) in Paraíso do Sul of Rio Grande do Sul Brazil. This locality is part of the Pinheiros-Chiniquá Sequence of the Santa Maria Supersequence, representing the Dinodontosaurus Assemblage Zone. The specimen consists of a complete, articulated right hind limb.

In 2025, Rodrigo T. Müller described Retymaijychampsa beckerorum as a new genus and species of CLADE proterochampsid archosauriforms based on these fossil remains. The generic name, Retymaijychampsa, combines the Guarani words retyma, meaning "leg" and ijy, meaning "strong" with the Greek word champsa, meaning "crocodile", in reference to the hindlimb's robust morphology. The specific name, beckerorum, honors the Becker family, on whose property the type locality is located.

== Classification ==
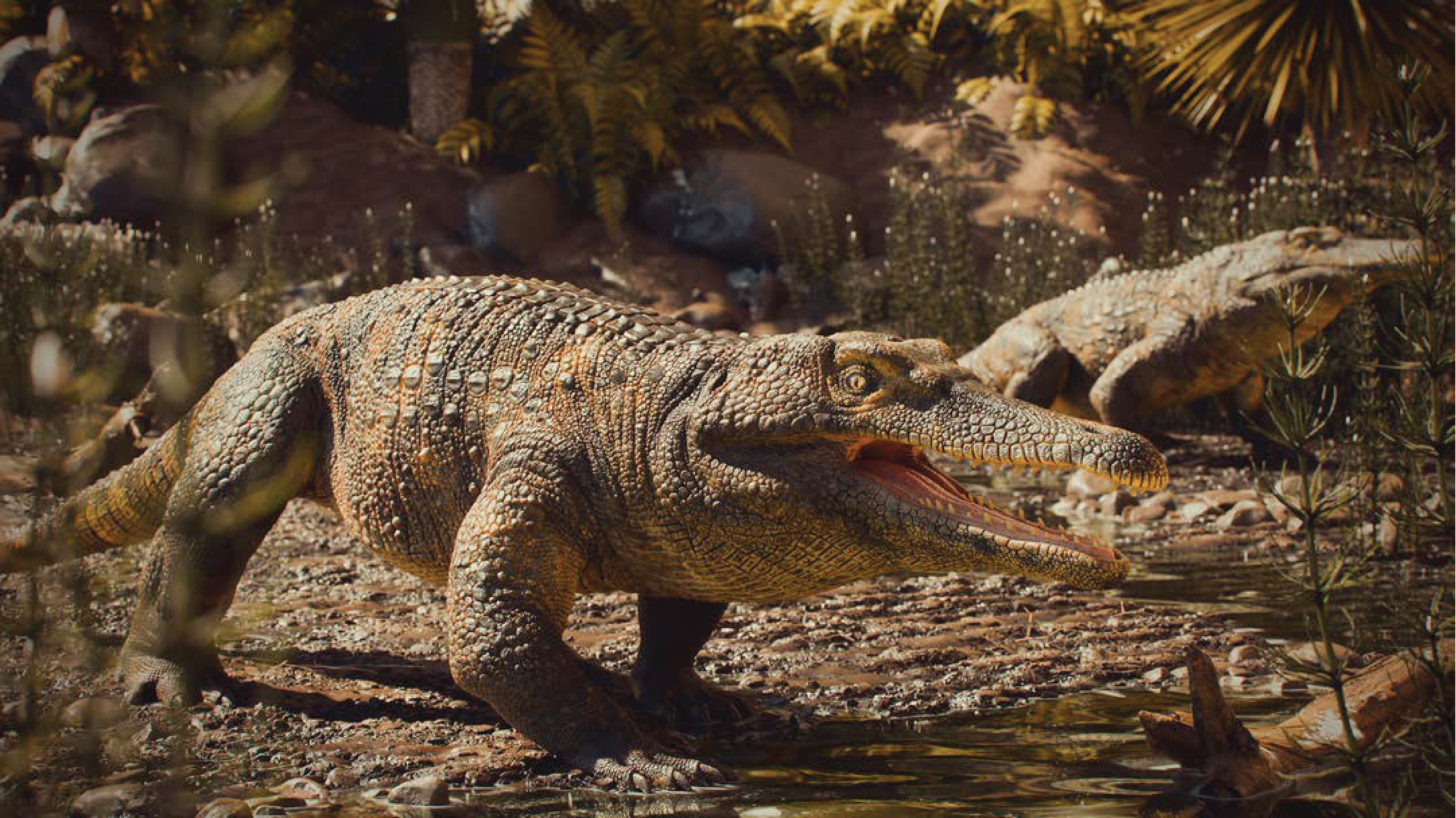
Speculative life restoration

In his phylogenetic analysis, Müller (2025) recovered Retymaijychampsa within the proterochampsian clade Proterochampsidae. It further placed in a polytomy with Proterochampsa spp. in a clade also including Sphodrosaurus. This group was named the Proterochampsinae. These results are displayed in the cladogram below:

- - - Avemetatarsalia
    - Pseudosuchia
  - Proterochampsia
    - Doswelliidae
      - - Litorosuchus
        - Vancleavea
      - - Polymorphodon
        - - Jaxtasuchus
          - - Doswellia
            - Rugarhynchos
    - - Stenoscelida
      - Proterochampsidae
        - Proterochampsinae
          - Sphodrosaurus
          - - Retymaijychampsa
            - Proterochampsa nodosa
            - Proterochampsa barrionuevoi
        - - Cerritosaurus
          - - Tropidosuchus
            - Rhadinosuchinae
              - MCP-4195-PV
              - - Gualosuchus
                - - Pseudochampsa
                  - - Chanaresuchus
                    - - Pinheirochampsa
                      - Kuruxuchampsa
                      - Rhadinosuchus
