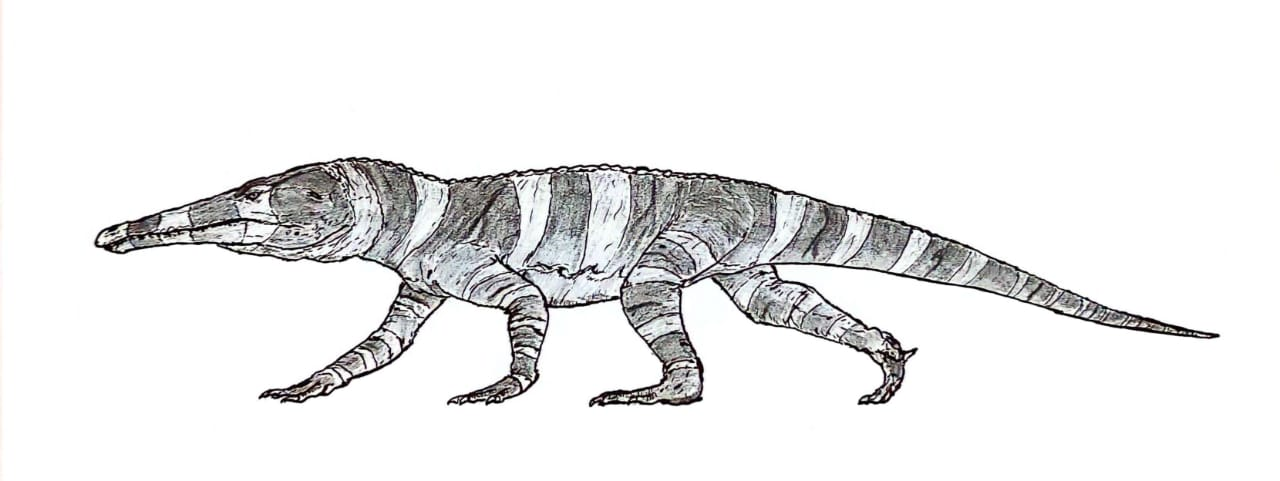
- Speculative life restoration

Scientific classification
- Domain: Eukaryota
- Kingdom: Animalia
- Phylum: Chordata
- Class: Reptilia
- Clade: Archosauromorpha
- Clade: Archosauriformes
- Clade: †Proterochampsia
- Genus: †Stenoscelida; Müller, Garcia & Fonseca, 2022
- Species: †S. aurantiacus

Binomial name
- †Stenoscelida aurantiacus Müller, Garcia & Fonseca, 2022

= Stenoscelida =

Stenoscelida Temporal range: Late Triassic (late Carnian/early Norian)

Genus of proterochampsid archosauriforms

Stenoscelida (meaning "narrow hind leg") is a genus of proterochampsid archosauriforms from the Late Triassic Santa Maria Supersequence (Paraná Basin) of Rio Grande do Sul, Brazil. The genus contains a single species, S. aurantiacus, known from a right hind limb.

== Discovery and naming ==
Stenoscelida type locality in Rio Grande do Sul, Brazil

The holotype specimen, CAPPA/UFSM 0293, was found at the Exaeretodon sub-Assemblage Zone (Hyperodapedon Assemblage Zone) of the Santa Maria Supersequence (lower Candelaria Sequence) in the Paraná Basin. This locality is dated to the late Carnian/early Norian ages of the upper Triassic period, around 228 million years old. It consists of a complete, articulated right hind limb.

In 2022, Stenoscelida aurantiacus was described as a new genus and species of proterochampsid archosauriforms by Rodrigo T. Müller, Mauricio S. Garcia, and André O. Fonseca based on these remains. The generic name, "Stenoscelida ", is derived from the Greek words "στενός", meaning "narrow", and "σκέλος" meaning "hind leg", in reference to the morphology of the holotype remains. The specific name, "aurantiacus", means "orange" in Latin, in reference to the color of the sediments of the type locality.

== Description ==
Based on the known fossil remains, Stenoscelida would have been smaller than the related Pseudochampsa and Proterochampsa from Argentina.

== Classification ==
In their phylogenetic analyses, Müller, Garcia & Fonseca (2022) recovered Stenoscelida as a member of the Proterochampsidae clade within Proterochampsia, in a polytomy with Tropidosuchus, Cerritosaurus, Gualosuchus, and Proterochampsa spp. In an updated analysis, Müller (2025) recovered greater resolution within Proterochampsia. He recovered Stenosclida immediately outside of the Proterochampsidae, as the sister taxon to this clade. These results are displayed in the cladogram below:

- - - Avemetatarsalia
    - Pseudosuchia
  - Proterochampsia
    - Doswelliidae
      - - Litorosuchus
        - Vancleavea
      - - Polymorphodon
        - - Jaxtasuchus
          - - Doswellia
            - Rugarhynchos
    - - Stenoscelida
      - Proterochampsidae
        - Proterochampsinae
          - Sphodrosaurus
          - - Retymaijychampsa
            - Proterochampsa nodosa
            - Proterochampsa barrionuevoi
        - - Cerritosaurus
          - - Tropidosuchus
            - Rhadinosuchinae
              - MCP-4195-PV
              - - Gualosuchus
                - - Pseudochampsa
                  - - Chanaresuchus
                    - - Pinheirochampsa
                      - - Kuruxuchampsa
                        - Rhadinosuchus
