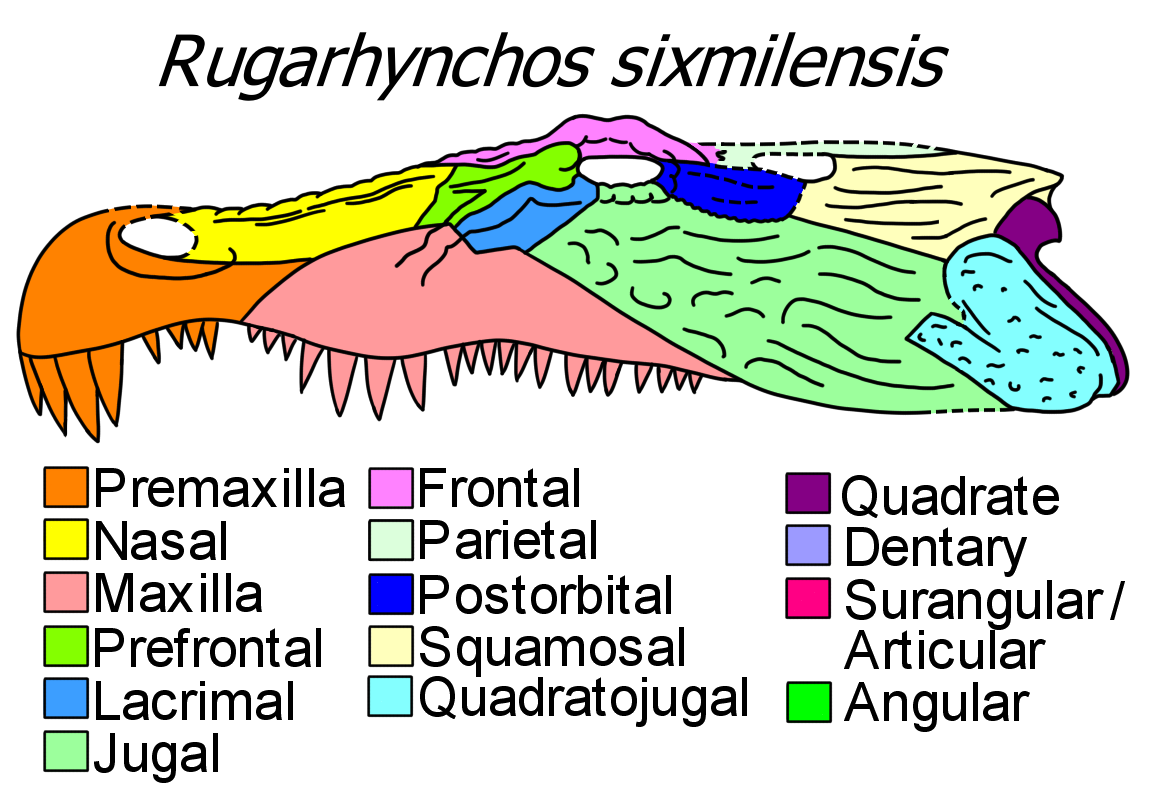
- Cranial diagram

Scientific classification
- Kingdom: Animalia
- Phylum: Chordata
- Class: Reptilia
- Clade: †Proterochampsia
- Family: †Doswelliidae
- Genus: †Rugarhynchos; Wynd et al., 2020

Type species
- †Doswellia sixmilensis Heckert et al., 2012

Species
- †Rugarhynchos sixmilensis Heckert et al., 2012

= Rugarhynchos =

Rugarhynchos Temporal range: Late Triassic, mid Norian, ~220 Ma

Extinct genus of reptiles

Rugarhynchos is an extinct genus of doswelliid archosauriform from the Late Triassic of New Mexico. The only known species is Rugarhynchos sixmilensis. It was originally described as a species of Doswellia in 2012, before receiving its own genus in 2020. Rugarhynchos was a close relative of Doswellia and shared several features with it, such as the absence of an infratemporal fenestra and heavily textured skull bones. However, it could also be distinguished by many unique characteristics, such as a thick diagonal ridge on the side of the snout, blunt spikes on its osteoderms, and a complex suture between the quadratojugal, squamosal, and jugal. Non-metric multidimensional scaling and tooth morphology suggest that Rugarhynchos had a general skull anatomy convergent with some crocodyliforms, spinosaurids, and phytosaurs (particularly Smilosuchus). However, its snout was somewhat less elongated than those other reptiles.

== Discovery ==
The only known specimen of Rugarhynchos is NMMNH P-16909, a partial skeleton consisting of several bones scattered over a small area. The largest component is a mostly complete right side of a skull. It was originally described as pertaining to part of the snout, until further preparation revealed that it included most of the skull. Other cranial fragments include a right quadrate, left premaxilla, left maxillary fragments, and a partial right quadratojugal which was originally considered another maxillary fragment. A fragment originally described as an articulated parietal and postorbital was later considered part of the palate. The only preserved portion of the jaw is a left surangular, although a large right pterygoid fragment was originally considered an articular. Postcranial remains include 13 osteoderms, several vertebral fragments, a few isolated rib fragments, the lower end of a left femur, and a possible pelvic fragment which was originally described as a calcaneum.

These fossils were found at Six Mile Canyon in McKinley County, New Mexico. They were recovered from a massive purple mudstone layer of the lower Bluewater Creek Formation, also known as the Bluewater Creek Member of the Chinle Formation. Other fossils from Six Mile Canyon include fragments of aetosaurs, phytosaurs, and metoposaurids. The top of the Bluewater Creek Member was separated from overlying strata by a distinct tuffaceous sandstone layer (the "SMC bed") at Six Mile Canyon. The age of the SMC bed has been estimated by several studies involving various Uranium-Lead dating techniques. A 2009 conference abstract argued that it was 219.3 ± 3.1 or 220.9 ± 0.6 million years old based on Laser Ablation–Inductively Coupled Plasma–Mass Spectrometry (LA-ICP-MS) and Isotope Dilution-Thermal Ionization Mass Spectrometry (ID-TIMS) dating techniques, respectively. A 2011 study instead found a slightly younger date of 218.1 ± 0.7 Ma based on Chemical Abrasion–Thermal Ionization Mass Spectrometry (CA-TIMS) dating. These estimates suggest that the rocks which preserved Rugarhynchos were deposited in the vicinity of 220 Ma.

The specimen was first described in 2012 as a new species of the armored archosauriform Doswellia. It was given the specific name Doswellia sixmilensis, in reference to its site of discovery. Its original describers noted that there was relatively little overlap between Doswellia sixmilensis and Doswellia kaltenbachi (the original species of Doswellia). They suggested that new material may lead to the two species being distinguished as two genera. Further preparation altered several interpretations of the specimen. The most notable of these was the discovery that the purported snout fragment was actually almost an entire skull. A 2020 study followed these new interpretations, describing how "Doswellia sixmilensis" had numerous unique features contrasting with Doswellia kaltenbachi. "D. sixmilensis" was placed into its own genus. The genus name is derived from Latin words for "wrinkle" and "nose", in reference to the wide variety of rough ridges on its snout.

== Description ==
=== Skull ===
The front of the premaxilla expands to the side, forming a bulbous structure similar to that of many phytosaurs. It possessed eight teeth, with the first four being much larger than the last four. Premaxillary teeth were conical and ornamented by longitudinal ridges, but lacked serrations or cutting edges. The tooth row was slightly downturned at an angle of 15-20 degrees. Unlike other proterochampsians, the nares (nostril holes) did not seem to be oriented upwards. The rear branch of the premaxilla wedges into an extensive suture between the nasal and maxilla. There were 20 teeth in the maxillary tooth row, significantly more than in the maxillae of proterochampsids but in line with other doswelliids. Four enlarged teeth in the front half of the tooth row are covered by a convex extension, giving the maxilla a sigmoid lower edge akin to that of "robust-morph" phytosaurs. The maxillary teeth of Rugarhynchos had negligible curvature and were similar to the premaxillary teeth.

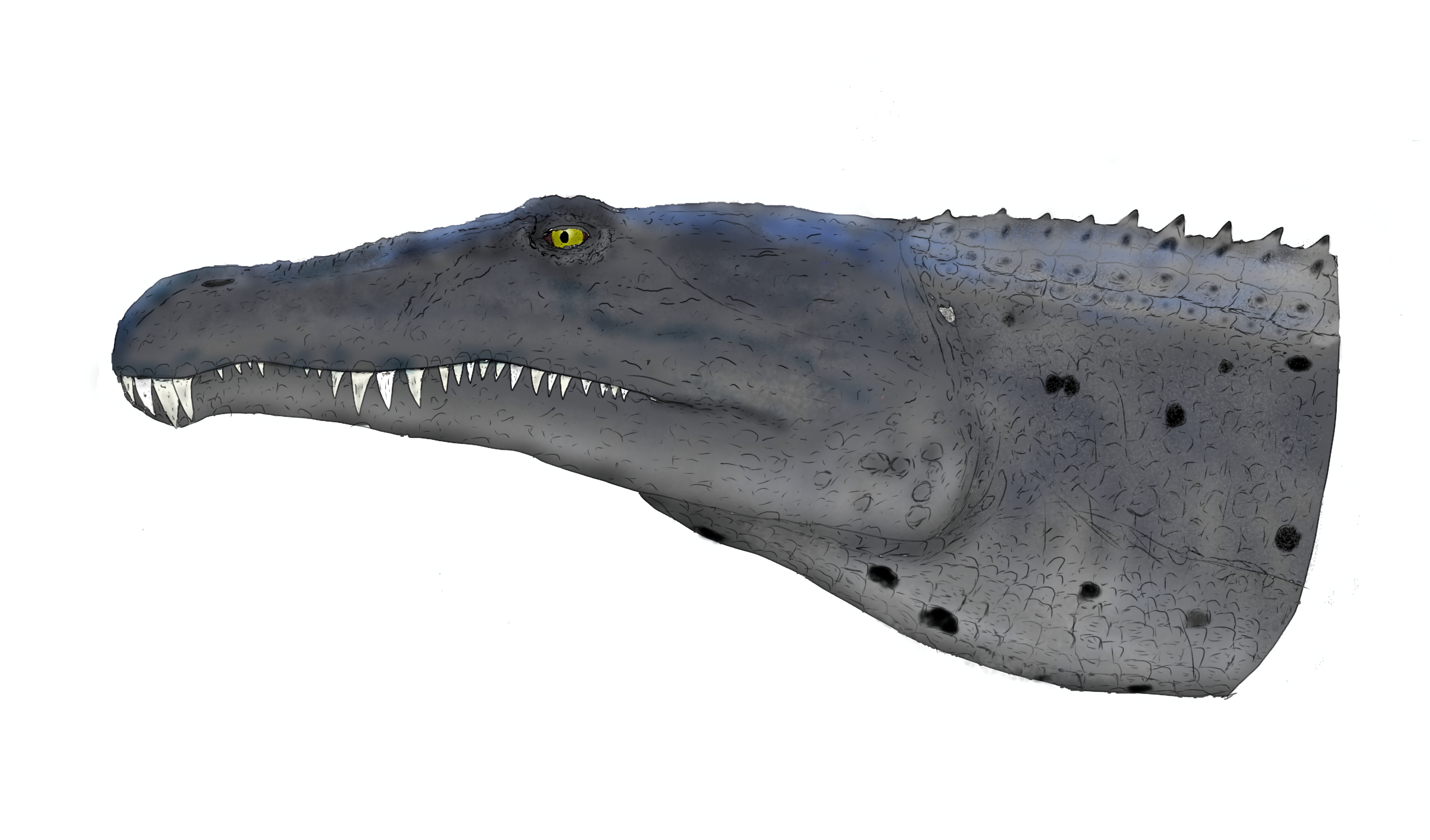
Reconstruction based on known skull and osteoderm

The nasal is roughly textured, hosting a prominent ridge along the midline of the skull along with several other low ridges. The rear of the nasals are incised by the triangular front edge of the frontals, creating a wedge-shaped suture also seen in Proterochampsa. The prefrontal and lacrimal form the front edge of the orbit (eye socket) and connect to the maxilla. Like other proterochampsians, there is no contact between the lacrimal and nasal. More unusually, there is also no trace of an antorbital fenestra between the maxilla, nasal, and lacrimal. The only other early archosauriform known to lack an antorbital fenestra is Vancleavea. One autapomorphy (unique distinguishing feature) of Rugarhynchos is the presence of a thick diagonal ridge on the side of the snout. This ridge extends from the upper part of the maxilla onto the lacrimal, prefrontal, and frontal. Chanaresuchus and Proterochampsa have a similar ridge in front of the orbit, though it is less pronounced and does not extend onto the maxilla. Various smaller ridges and rough spots are present near the large diagonal ridge of Rugarhynchos. These include a raised, bulbous rim of the orbit, a thin horizontal ridge on the prefrontal, and a thicker ridge along the prefrontal-frontal suture. The upper edge of the orbit also has a prominent raised boss formed by the frontal.

Behind and below the orbit lies the very large and blocky jugal. It is textured by prominent bumps, ridges, and pits, though these features are less pronounced than those of Doswellia. The overlying squamosal was also simple in shape and textured by long ridges and depressions. Its front edge formed the rear rim of a supratemporal fenestra, a hole in the upper part of the skull behind the orbits. The rear part of the squamosal connected to the quadrate and had a triangular horn-like structure similar to that of Doswellia. The postorbital is missing in the fossil, but its position relative to other bones can be inferred by the space it left behind. It would have been tightly connected to the jugal, squamosal, and frontal, leaving no space for an infratemporal fenestra. This gives Rugarhynchos a euryapsid skull akin to Doswellia. The rear edge of the skull is formed by the quadratojugal, which connects to the rest of the skull in several unique ways. The upper part of the quadratojugal edges a shallow concave area formed by the rear edge of the squamosal and jugal. The lower part of the quadratojugal fits into a prominent notch on the jugal. Both of these traits are autapomorphies of Rugarhynchos. The quadrate is steeply angled to the rest of the skull (like Chanaresuchus and Doswellia) and also has a large, hooked upper portion (like Vancleavea and allokotosaurians).

The middle of the pterygoid had a diagonal ridge with two rows of teeth stretching along its underside. This is intermediate between proterochampsids (which have one row of teeth on their pterygoid ridge) and Doswellia (which has at least three). A different ridge along the inner edge of the pterygoid also hosts a longitudinal row of teeth. A few teeth are randomly distributed between the two ridges, though there were likely many more originally present. A possible palatine bone is also preserved. This bone has a crescent-shaped front half and a saddle-shaped rear half. This is similar to Proterochampsa and Chanaresuchus, though insufficient data on basal archosauriform palates prevents comparison to many other taxa. The only preserved jaw bone is a large surangular which is textured by rough longitudinal ridges. It is generally similar to that of Doswellia, though its upper edge is not convex and its front tip is blunt and rounded. Unique to Rugarhynchos, there is a cup-shaped depression on the rear edge of the surangular below where it connects to the articular bone.

=== Postcrania ===
Postcranial material of Rugarhynchos is sparse. Several fragmentary or complete centra (main vertebral components) were among the fossils recovered. These centra were low and wide, similar to other doswelliids, Vancleavea, and Litorosuchus, but unlike proterochampsids. Low, elliptical rib facets were located on short stalks. Other doswelliids had similarly shaped rib facets though set on longer stalks. Like most other reptiles, Rugarhynchos would have had two rib facets on either side of a vertebra. The upper facets are termed diapophyses and connected to the upper rib head (tuberculum), while the lower facets are parapophyses and connected to the lower rib head (capitulum). No diapophyses are preserved, but large parapophyses were present close to the lower edge of the centrum. The capitulum and tuberculum of preserved ribs were closely set and cylindrical, as in Doswellia. The vertebrae were likely cervicals (neck vertebrae) due to having low-set parapophyses and prominent midline keels along their lower edge. Prominent excavations on the side of the vertebrae gave them an X-shaped cross-section when seen from above. The centra were rectangular from the side and would have connected with each other on an even level, indicating that the neck was straight.

A thick, curved bone fragment likely represents the upper part of a hip bone such as the pubis or ischium, though its identity cannot be determined precisely. A portion of the femur near the knee is the only fragment of the leg preserved in Rugarhynchos. Like other proterochampsians, this part of the femur was wide and had a subtle concavity on its front edge. The distal condyles were well-differentiated and both were slightly tapered. Although a pointed medial condyle is common to basal archosauriforms and pseudosuchians, a pointed lateral condyle is only observed in Gualosuchus among eucrocopodans.

Many osteoderms (bony plates) have been preserved. They were roughly square-shaped and ornamented by large circular pits which radiated from the center of each plate, like other doswelliids. Also in line with doswelliids, the osteoderms articulate with each other via a smooth and flat front edge rather than spines or notches. However, several traits of Rugarhynchos's osteoderms differ from other doswelliids. The pits are shallower and the upper surface of the osteoderm has a central blunt spike-like eminence rather than a raised keel. None of the osteoderms fossilized in articulation, so it is uncertain how they were arranged on the body. Nevertheless, Rugarhynchos likely had multiple longitudinal rows (columns) of osteoderms, as with other doswelliids. More irregularly shaped osteoderms near the skull may have connected to form a "nuchal shield" similar to that of Doswellia.

== Classification ==
To test its relations to other early archosauriforms, Rugarhynchos was placed into a phylogenetic analysis derived from an earlier study by Ezcurra et al. (2017). This analysis was run under both maximum parsimony and bayesian search protocols. The parsimony analysis placed Rugarhynchos as a doswelliid and the sister taxon to Doswellia. Doswelliids were the sister taxa to a monophyletic Proterochampsidae, and the Doswelliidae+Proterochampsidae clade was itself sister to a clade comprising Vancleavea and Litorosuchus. All of these taxa cumulatively make up the group Proterochampsia.

The bayesian analysis had a very similar result, but differed in one major way. Instead of having a clean break between proterochampsids and doswelliids, the bayesian analysis suggested that Proterochampsidae in its traditional form was paraphyletic rather than monophyletic. Proterochampsa was found as the sister taxon to doswelliids and separate from other proterochampsids. Though this novel result was unusual, it was considered more likely than the parsimony alternative because it accounted for variable rates of evolution. The results of the bayesian analysis are shown below:

- Archosauriformes
  - Proterosuchidae
  - - Fugusuchus
    - - Sarmatosuchus
      - - Cuyosuchus
        - Erythrosuchidae
        - - Dorosuchus
          - Asperoris
          - - Euparkeria
            - - Proterochampsia
                - - Vancleavea
                  - Litorosuchus
                - - - Proterochampsa
                    - Doswelliidae
                      - Jaxtasuchus
                      - - Doswellia
                        - Rugarhynchos
                  - - Cerritosaurus
                    - - Tropidosuchus
                      - - Pseudochampsa
                        - - Gualosuchus
                          - - Chanaresuchus
                            - Rhadinosuchus
              - Archosauria
                - Avemetatarsalia
                - Pseudosuchia
