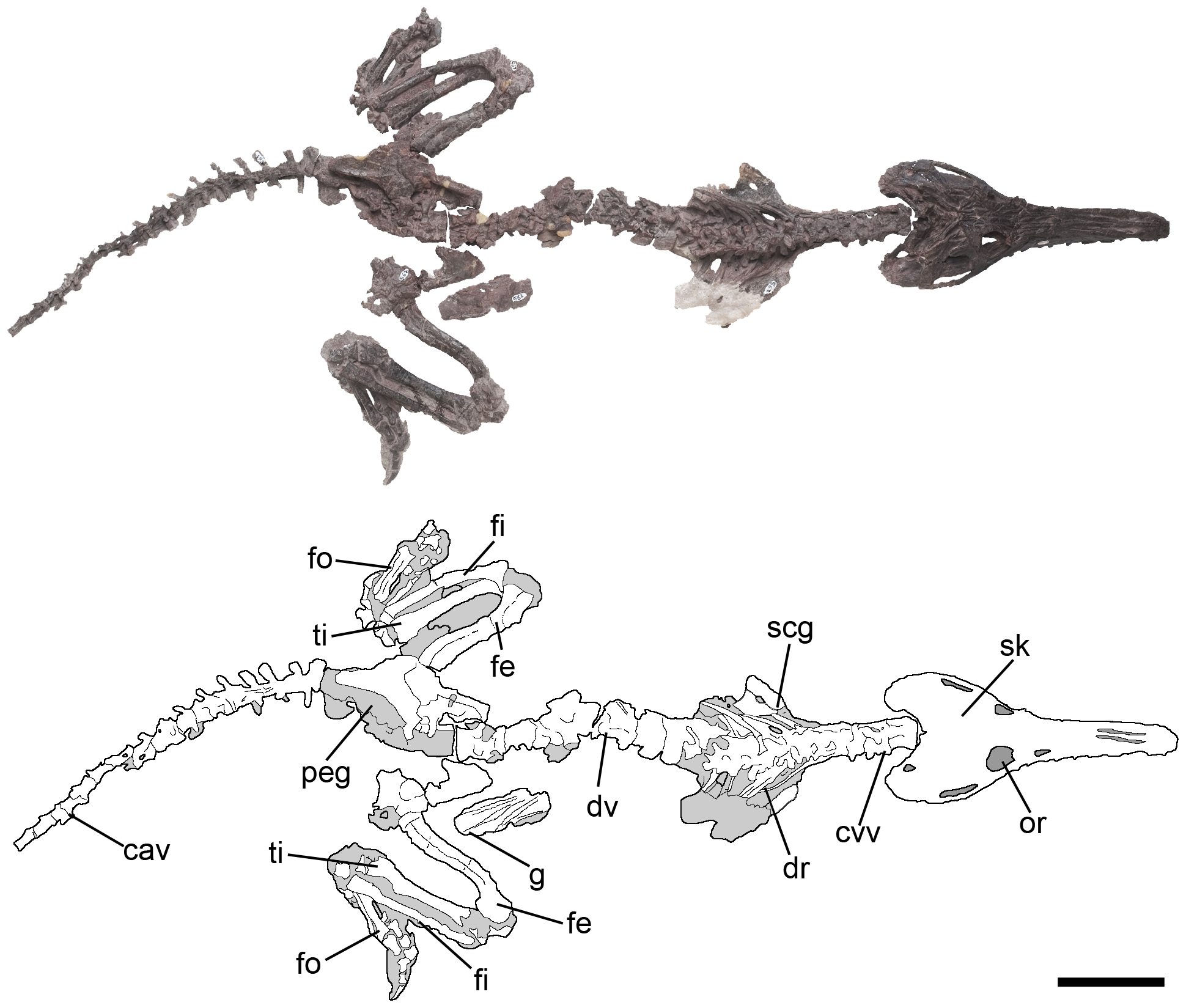
- Holotype skeleton

Scientific classification
- Domain: Eukaryota
- Kingdom: Animalia
- Phylum: Chordata
- Class: Reptilia
- Clade: Archosauromorpha
- Clade: Archosauriformes
- Clade: †Proterochampsia
- Family: †Proterochampsidae
- Subfamily: †Rhadinosuchinae
- Genus: †Pseudochampsa; Trotteyn & Ezcurra 2014

Type species
- †Pseudochampsa ischigualastensis (Trotteyn et al. 2012 [originally Chanaresuchus])

= Pseudochampsa =

Pseudochampsa Temporal range: Carnian ~229 Ma

Extinct genus of reptiles

Pseudochampsa is an extinct genus of proterochampsid archosauriform known from the Late Triassic (Carnian) Cancha de Bochas Member of the Ischigualasto Formation of San Juan Province, Ischigualasto-Villa Unión Basin in northwestern Argentina. It contains a single species, Pseudochampsa ischigualastensis, originally named as a second species of the closely related Chanaresuchus, based on a fairly complete articulated skeleton and skull. A revision of the remains concluded that it was best to move to species to its own genus, as no traits were found to unite P. ischigualastensis and the type species of Chanaresuchus to the exclusion of other proterochampsids. A phylogenetic analysis places both species in a polytomy with Gualosuchus as the most advanced members of Proterochampsia.

== Discovery ==
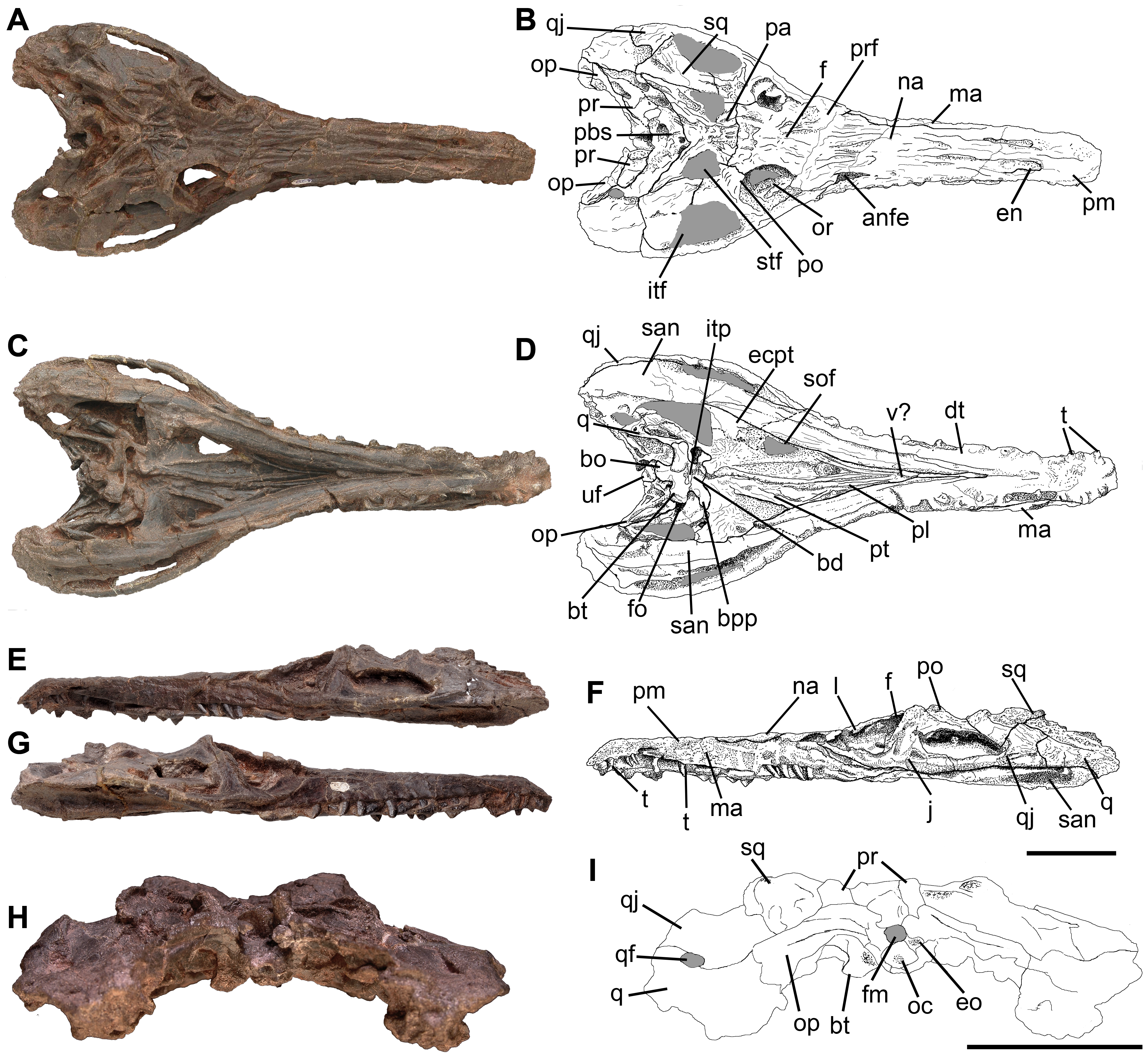
Skull in multiple views

Pseudochampsa is known solely from the holotype PVSJ 567, a nearly complete and articulated individual housed at the División de Paleontologia de Vertebrados del Museo de Ciencias Naturales y Universidad Nacional de San Juan, Argentina. The holotype consists of a skull with fully occluded lower jaws, a complete vertebral column lacking the outer half of the tail, several neck and back ribs, some haemal arches, some gastralia, the pectoral girdle, both partially preserved humeri, a partial pelvic girdle, and both nearly complete hind-limbs including both femora, tibiae, fibulae, tarsals and feet. PVSJ 567 was found at Valle Pintado, Hoyada de Ischigualasto of the Ischigualasto Provincial Park, San Juan Province. It was collected from the Cancha de Bochas Member of the Ischigualasto Formation, of Ischigualasto-Villa Union Basin, dating to the late Carnian to earliest Norian stages of the middle Late Triassic.

== Etymology ==
The type species of Pseudochampsa was first described and named by María J. Trotteyn, Ricardo N. Martínez and Oscar A. Alcober in 2012, as a second species of Chanaresuchus, C. ischigualastensis. The specific name refers to the Ischigualasto Formation that yielded the holotype and only known specimen, with the Latin suffix -ensis, meaning "from". Trotteyn and Martín D. Ezcurra reassigned the species to its own genus in 2014, naming Pseudochampsa and creating the new combination Pseudochampsa ischigualastensis. The new generic name is derived from Greek pseudo, meaning "false", and champsa, meaning "crocodile", and refers to the crocodile-like body morphology of P. ischigualastensis.

== Description ==
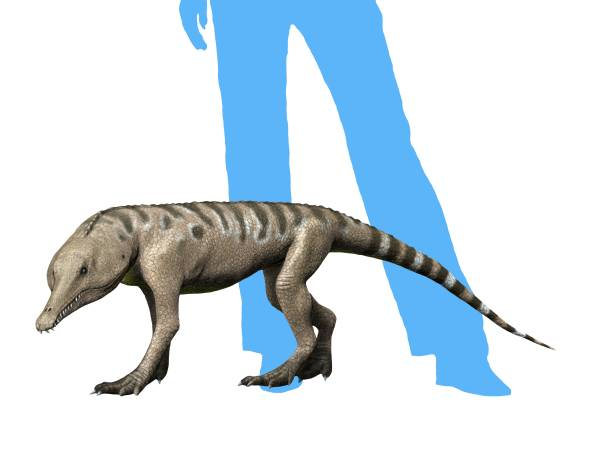
Life reconstruction of Pseudochampsa ischigualastensis

The type species of Pseudochampsa was originally thought to be a member of Chanaresuchus. Trotteyn et al. (2012) referred this species to Chanaresuchus and diagnosed Chanaresuchus based on the presence of cranial ornamentation by longitudinal crests and depressions on the upper surfaces of the premaxillae, maxillae and nasal bones, a side fossa on the centrum of the presacral vertebrae, a low deltopectoral crest on the humerus, and the absence of a fifth toe. However, Trotteyn and Ezcurra (2014) revised these supposed synapomorphies of Chanaresuchus and found them to represent synapomorphies of larger clades. Cranial ornamentation of this form as seen in Chanaresuchus bonapartei and P. ischigualastensis is also present in Gualosuchus reigi and Rhadinosuchus gracilis. The shallow weakly-rimmed depression of the presacral centra in these species is also shared with Tropidosuchus romeri, G. reigi and R. gracilis. The low deltopectoral crest on the humerus is present in all known proterochampsids to the exclusion of R. gracilis, in which it is unknown, and Proterochampsa barrionuevoi. Finally, at least one other proterochampsid apart from C. bonapartei and P. ischigualastensis is known to lack a fifth toe - T. romeri. The three established autapomorphies of C. bonapartei by Dilkes and Arcucci (2012), are either unknown in P. ischigualastensis or known to differ from it. In fact, two out of the three autapomorphies (a deep well-defined depression in front of the nostril, and an elongated oval supratemporal fenestrae with a back-side directed main axis) are absent in P. ischigualastensis, in which this depression is shallow like in G. reigi, and the supratemporal fenestra is near-triangular and aligned with the long axis of the skull. Thus, Trotteyn and Ezcurra (2014) found no synapomorphies that unite C. bonapartei and P. ischigualastensis exclusively, or support their monophyly within Chanaresuchus, requiring a new generic name for "C." ischigualastensis.

The phylogenetic analysis of Trotteyn and Ezcurra (2014) placed C. bonapartei and P. ischigualastensis in a polytomy with G. reigi. They also suggested that R. gracilis, not included in the analysis, might be the sister taxon of C. bonapartei, based on morphology, further supporting the exclusion of P. ischigualastensis from Chanaresuchus.

Trotteyn and Ezcurra (2014) distinguished P. ischigualastensis from other proterochampsids, including C. bonapartei, based on a unique combination traits. These include a transversely broad basicranium with transversely oriented basal tubera, paroccipital processes with vertically expanded far end, the absence of a retroarticular projection on the lower jaws, tail vertebrae with a mid longitudinal groove on the bottom surface of the centrum and with pre- and post-zygapophyses strongly divergent from the midline, the lack of foramina on the back groove of the astragalus, and finally, osteoderm ornamentation consisting solely of longitudinal grooving.

== Phylogeny ==
The simplified cladogram below follows Trotteyn and Ezcurra (2014) phylogenetic analysis, who used the data set of Dilkes & Arcucci (2012).

- Archosauriformes
  - Proterosuchus fergusi
  - - Erythrosuchus africanus
    - - - Doswellia kaltenbachi
        - Vancleavea campi
      - - - Euparkeria capensis
          - - Parasuchus hislopi
            - Archosauria
        - Proterochampsia
          - Proterochampsidae
            - Proterochampsa barrionuevoi
            - - Cerritosaurus binsfeldi
              - - Tropidosuchus romeri
                - - Chanaresuchus bonapartei
                  - Gualosuchus reigi
                  - Pseudochampsa ischigualastensis
