= Chañares Formation =

Geologic formation in Argentina

- Stratigraphic range: Latest Ladinian? - early Carnian; ~237–234 Ma
- Type: Geologic formation
- Unit of: Agua de la Peña Group
- Sub-units: Lower member, Upper member
- Underlies: Los Rastros Formation
- Overlies: Tarjados Formation
- Thickness: ~70 meters

Lithology
- Primary: Claystone, siltstone, sandstone
- Other: Tuff, conglomerate

Location
- Coordinates: 29.8°S 67.8°W
- Approximate paleocoordinates: 49.9°S 37.8°W
- Region: La Rioja Province
- Country: Argentina
- Extent: Ischigualasto-Villa Unión Basin

Type section
- Named for: Chañares River
- Chañares Formation (Argentina)

The Chañares Formation is a Carnian-age geologic formation of the Ischigualasto-Villa Unión Basin, located in La Rioja Province, Argentina. It is characterized by drab-colored fine-grained volcaniclastic claystones, siltstones, and sandstones which were deposited in a fluvial to lacustrine environment. The formation is most prominently exposed within Talampaya National Park, a UNESCO World Heritage Site within La Rioja Province.

The Chañares formation is the lowermost stratigraphic unit of the Agua de la Peña Group, overlying the Tarjados Formation of the Paganzo Group, and underlying the Los Rastros Formation. Though previously considered Ladinian in age, U-Pb dating has determined that most or all of the Chañares Formation dates to the early Carnian stage of the Late Triassic.

The Chañares Formation has provided a diverse and well-preserved faunal assemblage which has been studied intensively since the 1960s. The most common reptiles were proterochampsids (Chanaresuchus, Tropidosuchus, and Gualosuchus), which lived alongside true archosaurs such as Lewisuchus, Lagerpeton, Marasuchus, Gracilisuchus, and Luperosuchus. Cynodonts were abundant, represented by the medium-sized traversodontid Massetognathus, as well as smaller carnivores such as Chiniquodon and Probainognathus. The largest animal in the ecosystem was the giant dicynodont Dinodontosaurus. An older faunal assemblage, distinguished by the large erpetosuchid Tarjadia, has been discovered in the earliest part of the formation. The formation as a whole is considered one of the best sources of Carnian-age tetrapods in South America, along with the slightly younger Ischigualasto Formation which lies above the Los Rastros Formation.

== Geology ==
The Chañares Formation is the lowermost unit of the Agua de la Peña Group, representing the onset of the first syn-rift phase of the Ischigualasto-Villa Unión Basin. It unconformably overlies red fluvial (river) sediments of the Tarjados Formation of the Paganzo Group, and is conformably overlain by greenish lake and delta sediments of the Los Rastros Formation. The Chañares Formation has also had an interesting history with the lower part of the Ischichuca Formation. This sequence of sediments on the western edge of the basin has occasionally been considered to take priority over the Chañares Formation and the lower part of the Los Rastros Formation. However, this is rare due to the historical significance of the Chañares Formation. As a result, some authors restrict the Ischichuca Formation to a few layers of lake and delta sediments between the Chañares and Los Rastros formations, while others reject using it in the first place.

The Chañares formation was originally thought to be deposited during the Ladinian stage of the Middle Triassic. However, Uranium-Lead radiometric dating by Marsicano et al. (2016) later found that a large portion of the formation was deposited in the early Carnian (237–234 Ma), near the start of the Late Triassic. 2020 U-Pb dating of the overlying lower Los Rastros Formation yielded an age of 234.47 ± 0.44 Ma, making the vast majority of the Chañares Formation lowermost Carnian. Nevertheless, the Ladinian-Carnian boundary may still lie within the first few meters of the formation, despite the primary fossiliferous sections being well-supported as early Carnian in age.

The formation is primarily sandstone, siltstone, and claystone, arranged in a specific sequence of facies. A distinct and uneven unconformity separates the base of the Chañares Formation from the underlying Tarjados Formation. In the field, this unconformity can be identified by a high-relief layer of chert at the top of the Tarjados Formation.

=== Fluvial olive-grey facies ===
Above this unconformity lies the oldest section of the Chañares Formation, a package of olive-grey fluvial sediments. As one goes up the section, increasingly finer beds of sandstone and siltstone are interlayered with coarser lenses, corresponding to periodic sheet floods along braided rivers. Weakly-developed palaeosols can be found within this section, filled with root traces, pebbles and small brown calcareous nodules. Winding systems of burrows have also been found in this section, likely created by small cynodonts.

Though fossils are relatively uncommon in the lower fluvial beds of the Chañares Formation, they are taxonomically and taphonomically distinct from those of succeeding layers. The most common remains are from large dicynodonts (possibly referable to Dinodontosaurus), the large erpetosuchid Tarjadia, and small non-massetognathine cynodonts closely related to Aleodon and Scalenodon. This ecosystem has been termed the Tarjadia Assemblage Zone, in order to distinguish it from the slightly younger classic Chañares assemblage. No radiometric dating has been done on this section, but it may contain the Ladinian-Carnian boundary based on dates obtained within the younger facies.

=== Fossiliferous bluish facies ===
Above the olive-grey fluvial beds is the most fossiliferous and well-studied portion of the formation. This section is characterized by wide and massive layers of very fine bluish-grey sandstone, siltstone, and claystone. These layers have a high concentration of volcanic ash and debris, ranging from glassy shards at the base to weathered bentonites at the top. Nearby volcanic eruptions likely impacted the local climate and river systems, shifting the depositional regime from a stable braided fluvial system to one dominated by shallow floodplains and lahars. Marsicano et al. (2016) obtained a CA-TIMS U-Pb age of 236.1 ± 0.6 Ma from a siltstone bed immediately below the first major fossil layer within the bluish facies. Ezcurra et al. (2017) later studied a slightly older sandstone bed using LA-MC-IMP-MS U-Pb dating. They found a date of 236.2 ± 1.1 Ma from a cluster of the three youngest zircons.

The most productive and historically relevant fossil beds of the Chañares Formation lie within these volcaniclastic layers. The layers are replete with massive calcareous concretions, some up to 2 meters in width. They commonly preserve articulated skeletal material, often complete skeletons from multiple taxa in a single concretion. Well-preserved fossils found within concretions typically represent smaller taxa, which were buried rapidly after death. Volcanic catastrophes such as lahars, ash falls, or pyroclastic flows are the preferred cause of these rapid mass mortality events. More fragmentary fossils are also occasionally found outside of concretions, much like fossils of the underlying Tarjadia AZ. Fossils found outside concretions are typically from large animals, and were probably buried more slowly (albeit still fairly rapidly) by gradual processes.

The classic Chañares fauna, recently codified as the Massetognathus-Chanaresuchus Assemblage Zone, is characteristic of this section of the formation. The largest components of the ecosystem include dicynodonts (namely Dinodontosaurus) and indeterminate carnivorous paracrocodylomorphs, similar to taxa from the underlying Tarjadia AZ. By far the most common fossils belong to three species of cynodonts: Massetognathus pascuali, Probainognathus jenseni, and Chiniquodon theotonicus.These three species comprise nearly 3/4ths of the fossils found in the formation, with almost half of the total fossils in the formation referred to Massetognathus alone. Reptile fossils are less prevalent but more diverse, with the most common belonging to the proterochampsid archosauriform Chanaresuchus. Other notable taxa include Lagerpeton, Lagosuchus, and Lewisuchus, which were among the oldest ornithodirans, elaborating on the ancestry of dinosaurs and pterosaurs. Several communal latrines are known from the bluish facies, preserving dicynodont coprolites filled with plant remains.

=== Upper member ===
The olive-grey fluvial section and the bluish-grey volcaniclastic section collectively form the lower member of the Chañares Formation. They are overlain by an upper member, which is practically devoid of body fossils. The upper member is generally similar to the bluish facies in appearance, with wide beds of fine-grained volcaniclastic sediments with a pale grey color. Unlike the bluish facies, concretions and body fossils are absent, having been replaced by Taenidium worm burrows. These burrows likely indicate that the environment had transitioned into a lacustrine (lake) ecosystem by the time that the upper member was deposited. Some outcrops preserve a few sandstone and conglomerate beds near the top of the upper member. These indicate that the depositional regime continued to shift towards the deltaic environment of the overlying Los Rastros Formation. The coarser beds also contain a few rare body fossils from fish and tetrapods. A white tuff near the base of the upper member has been dated to 233.7 ± 0.4 Ma, while a zircon cluster from a sandy tuff at the top of the formation was dated to 233.6 ± 1.1 Ma.

== Paleobiota ==
=== Synapsids ===
Color key: Taxon / Reclassified taxon / Taxon falsely reported as present / Dubious taxon or junior synonym / Ichnotaxon / Ootaxon / Morphotaxon

Notes
Uncertain or tentative taxa are in small text
~~crossed out~~ taxa are discredited.Tetrapod burrows, likely produced by small eucynodonts, have been described from the lower section of the formation. A large dicynodont fossil preserves taphonomic markers which help to reconstruct the sequence of burial, decay, and fossilization responsible for articulated fossils in the formation.

Cynodonts

Cynodonts of the Chañares Formation
Genus / Taxon	Species	Assemblage Zone	Material	Notes	Images
Aleodontinae indet.		Tarjadia AZ	A single partial skull	A small indeterminate aleodontine chiniquodontid cynodont, formerly referred to cf. Aleodon.	
Chiniquodon	C. theotonicus	Massetognathus-Chanaresuchus AZ	Numerous specimens	A common chiniquodontid cynodont	
Riojanodon	R. nenoi	Tarjadia AZ	Two partial lower jaws	An aleodontine chiniquodontid cynodont.	
Massetognathus	M. major	Massetognathus-Chanaresuchus AZ	A single skull	A junior synonym of Massetognathus pascuali	
Massetognathus	M. pascuali	Massetognathus-Chanaresuchus AZ	Numerous specimens (almost half of all recovered fossils)	An abundant massetognathine traversodontid cynodont	
Massetognathus	M. teruggii	Massetognathus-Chanaresuchus AZ	Several skulls	A junior synonym of Massetognathus pascuali	
Megagomphodon	M. oligodens	Massetognathus-Chanaresuchus AZ	A pair of skulls	A junior synonym of Massetognathus pascuali	
Pontognathus	P. ignotus	Massetognathus-Chanaresuchus AZ	Partial skull	A rare traversodontid cynodont	
Probainognathus	P. jenseni	Massetognathus-Chanaresuchus AZ	Numerous specimens	A very common probainognathid cynodont	
Probelesodon	P. lewisi	Massetognathus-Chanaresuchus AZ	Numerous specimens	A probable junior synonym of Chiniquodon theotonicus	
Probelesodon	P. minor	Massetognathus-Chanaresuchus AZ	Numerous specimens	A probable junior synonym of Probelesodon lewisi or Chiniquodon theotonicus	
cf. Scalenodon/Mandagomphodon		Tarjadia AZ	Two partial jaws	A small basal traversodontid cynodont	

Dicynodonts

Dicynodonts of the Chañares Formation
Genus / Taxon	Species	Assemblage Zone	Material	Notes	Images
Dinodontosaurus	D. brevirostris	Massetognathus-Chanaresuchus AZ	Several specimens	A large kannemeyeriiform dicynodont	
Dinodontosaurus	D. platyceps	Massetognathus-Chanaresuchus AZ	Two specimens	A massive kannemeyeriiform dicynodont	
Dinodontosaurus	D. platygnathus	Massetognathus-Chanaresuchus AZ	One fragmentary specimen	A massive kannemeyeriiform dicynodont	
Dinodontosaurus	D. sp.	Massetognathus-Chanaresuchus AZ	Several specimens	A massive kannemeyeriiform dicynodont	
Kannemeyeriiformes indet.		Tarjadia AZ	Several specimens	Indeterminate remains from massive kannemeyeriiform dicynodonts, possibly referrable to Dinodontosaurus	
Stahleckeria	S. sp.	Tarjadia AZ	An incomplete ulna	A large stahleckeriine dicynodont	

=== Reptiles ===
Reptiles of the Chañares Formation
Genus	Species	Assemblage Zone	Material	Notes	Images
Chanaresuchus	C. bonapartei	Massetognathus-Chanaresuchus AZ	Several specimens	A fairly common proterochampsid archosauriform	
Elorhynchus	E. carrolli	Tarjadia AZ	One specimen	A stenaulorhynchine rhynchosaur	
Gracilisuchus	G. stipaniciorum	Massetognathus-Chanaresuchus AZ	Several specimens	A small gracilisuchid pseudosuchian	
Gualosuchus	G. reigi	Massetognathus-Chanaresuchus AZ	Two specimens	A rare proterochampsid archosauriform	
Lagerpeton	L. chanarensis	Massetognathus-Chanaresuchus AZ	Several specimens	A small lagerpetid pterosauromorph.	
Lagosuchus	L. talampayensis	Massetognathus-Chanaresuchus AZ	One specimen (apart from those referred to Marasuchus)	A small bipedal dinosauriform. Original specimen may be indeterminate or valid	
Lewisuchus	L. admixtus	Massetognathus-Chanaresuchus AZ	Several specimens, including two with cranial material.	A silesaurid dinosauriform	
Luperosuchus	L. fractus	Tarjadia AZ	A partial skull	A large predatory loricatan pseudosuchian	
Marasuchus	M. lilloensis	Massetognathus-Chanaresuchus AZ	Several specimens	A small bipedal dinosauriform, originally described as a species of Lagosuchus. May be a junior synonym of Lagosuchus talampayensis	
Paracrocodylomorpha indet.		Tarjadia AZ, Massetognathus-Chanaresuchus AZ	Several specimens	Medium-sized to very large indeterminate paracrocodylomorphs	
Pseudolagosuchus	P. major	Massetognathus-Chanaresuchus AZ	Several specimens	A junior synonym of Lewisuchus admixtus	
Rhadinosuchinae indet.		Massetognathus-Chanaresuchus AZ	A pair of partial skeletons, one of which including a skull	Indeterminate rhadinosuchine proterochampsids showing a combination of features from previously known rhadinosuchine species such as Chanaresuchus, Gualosuchus, and Rhadinosuchus	
Shakajlura	S. riojanensis	Tarjadia AZ	A partial skull and fragmentary postcrania	A paracrocodylomorph	
Stenaulorhynchinae indet.		Tarjadia AZ	A few tooth plates and jaw fragments	Indeterminate stenaulorhynchine rhynchosaurs, likely synonymous with Elorhynchus	
Tarjadia	T. ruthae	Tarjadia AZ	Several specimens	A large predatory erpetosuchid	
Telkaralura	T. coniceti	Massetognathus-Chanaresuchus AZ	Partial skull	A large gracilisuchid pseudosuchian.	
Tropidosuchus	T. romeri	Massetognathus-Chanaresuchus AZ	Several specimens	A fairly common proterochampsid archosauriform	

=== Fish ===
Fish of the Chañares Formation
Taxon	Assemblage Zone	Material	Notes	Images
Mawsoniidae indet.	Massetognathus-Chanaresuchus AZ (lower member of the formation)	Skull fragment	An indeterminate mawsoniid coelacanth	
cf. Pseudobeaconiidae	Upper member of the formation	Scale patches	An indeterminate pseudobeaconiid perleidiform	

=== Invertebrates ===
A diverse insect fauna is known from the Ischichuca Formation, which is sometimes considered equivalent to the Chañares Formation.

=== Plants ===
Plant remains and palynomorphs preserved in the dicynodont coprolites were described in 2018. Though it is difficult to determine the affinities of the larger plant fragments, the palynomorphs are more conclusive. They belong to a broad range of plants, most abundantly pollen from umkomasiales (a type of seed fern), and in smaller portions from podocarpacean and voltzialean conifers. Spores from humid-loving groups such as bryophytes, lycopsids, true ferns, and algae were also present but rare. The palynomorph taxa generally resemble those of the Dicroidium flora which is common in other late Ladinian-early Carnian units. More precisely, the flora is intermediate between the temperate Ipswich flora of far southern Gondwana, and the hot, subtropical Onslow flora which developed along the southern shore of the Neotethys. This transitional character is also observed in the flora of the Ischigualasto Formation, as well as the Flagstone Bench Formation of Antarctica. Curiously, the Los Rastros Formation, which was deposited between the Chañares and Ischigualasto Formations, preserves a typical Ipswich flora. This likely indicates that all three formations lie at a latitude which allows them to quickly shift between the different floras during small climatic changes.

Plant macrofossils are absent from the Chañares Formation (in contrast to the Los Rastros and Ischigualasto formations). Nevertheless, fossil wood, foliage, and reproductive structures have been described from the Ischichuca Formation.

== See also ==
- Ischigualasto Formation
- Los Rastros Formation
- Santa Maria Formation
- Omingonde Formation
