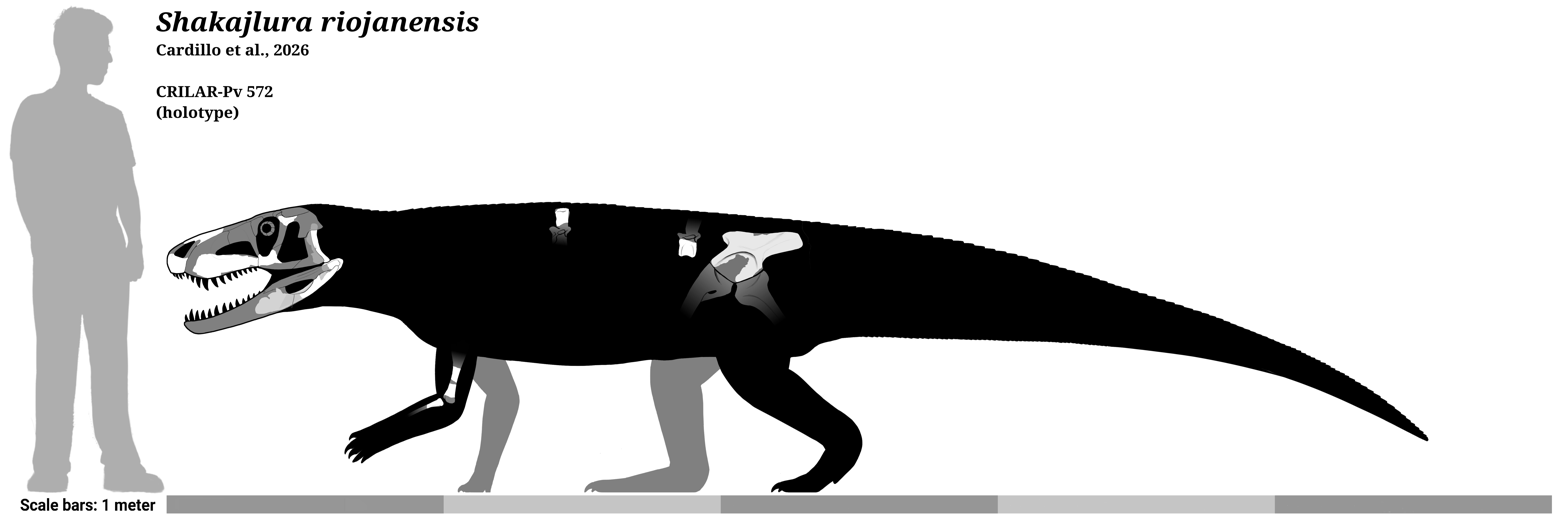
- Reconstructed skeleton compared to a human silhouette

Scientific classification
- Kingdom: Animalia
- Phylum: Chordata
- Class: Reptilia
- Clade: Pseudosuchia
- Clade: Paracrocodylomorpha
- Genus: †Shakajlura; Cardillo et al., 2026
- Species: †S. riojanensis

Binomial name
- †Shakajlura riojanensis Cardillo et al., 2026

= Shakajlura =

Shakajlura Temporal range: Middle–Late Triassic, late Ladinian–early Carnian

Genus of fossil pseudosuchian

Shakajlura (lit. 'blessed lizard') is an extinct genus of paracrocodylomorph known from the Middle–Late Triassic (Ladinian–Carnian ages) Chañares Formation of Argentina. The genus contains a single species, Shakajlura riojanensis, known from a partial skull and fragmentary skeleton.

== Discovery and naming ==
S. riojanensis type locality in La Rioja Province, Argentina

The Shakajlura fossil material was discovered during fieldwork in the autumns of 2017 and 2018 in the Campo Cordoba Norte locality of the Chañares Formation (Ischigualasto-Villa Unión Basin) in Talampaya National Park in La Rioja Province of northwestern Argentina. These rock layers are assigned to the Tarjadia Assemblage Zone. The fossils were prepared at the La Plata Museum before being accessioned in the vertebrate paleontology collection of the Centro Regional de Investigaciones Científicas y Transferencia Tecnológica, (CRILAR-Pv) as specimen CRILAR-Pv 572. It consists of various disarticulated pieces of the skull and postcranial skeleton.

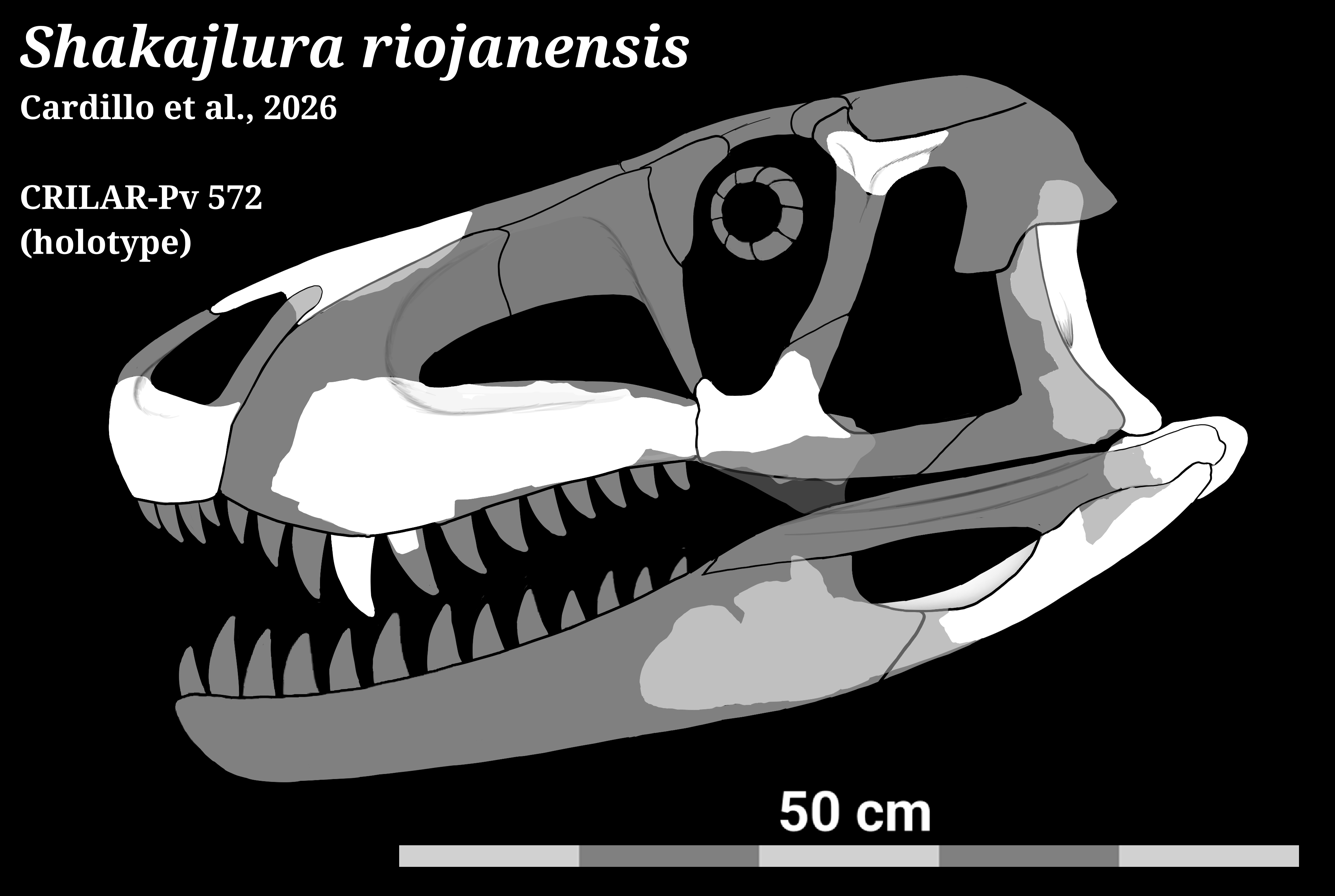
Reconstructed skull

In 2026, Ariel F. Cardillo and colleagues described Shakajlura riojanensis as a new genus and species of paracrocodylomorph based on these fossil remains, establishing CRILAR-Pv 572 as the holotype specimen. The generic name, Shakajlura, is derived from the Kakan words shakaj and lura, meaning 'blessed' and 'lizard', respectively. The specific name, riojanensis, references the Argentine province from which the holotype was collected.

== Classification ==
To test the affinities and relationships of Shakajlura, Cardillo et al. (2026) included it in an updated version of the phylogenetic matrix of Desojo & Rauhut (2024). Using implied weighting, Shakajlura was recovered in an unresolved polytomy of early-diverging members of the pseudosuchian clade Paracrocodylomorpha, outside of the Poposauroidea and Loricata. The roughly coeval Luperosuchus, which is comparable in size and superficially similar to Shakajlura, was recovered as a basal loricatan. These results are displayed in the cladogram below:

- Pseudosuchia
  - †Ornithosuchidae
  - - - †Aetosauriformes
      - †Erpetosuchidae
    - - †Nundasuchus
      - - †Gracilisuchidae
        - - †Mambawakale ruhuhu
          - †Schultzsuchus loricatus
          - †Shakajlura riojanensis
          - †Ticinosuchus ferox
          - - †Mandasuchus tanyauchen
            - CPEZ-239b
          - †Poposauroidea
          - Loricata
            ⊞
            - †Luperosuchus fractus
            - †Prestosuchus spp.
            - †Saurosuchus galilei
            - - - †Batrachotomus kupferzellensis
                - †Heptasuchus clarki
              - - †Fasolasuchus tenax
                - - †Rauisuchidae
                  - Crocodylomorpha
            ⊟
