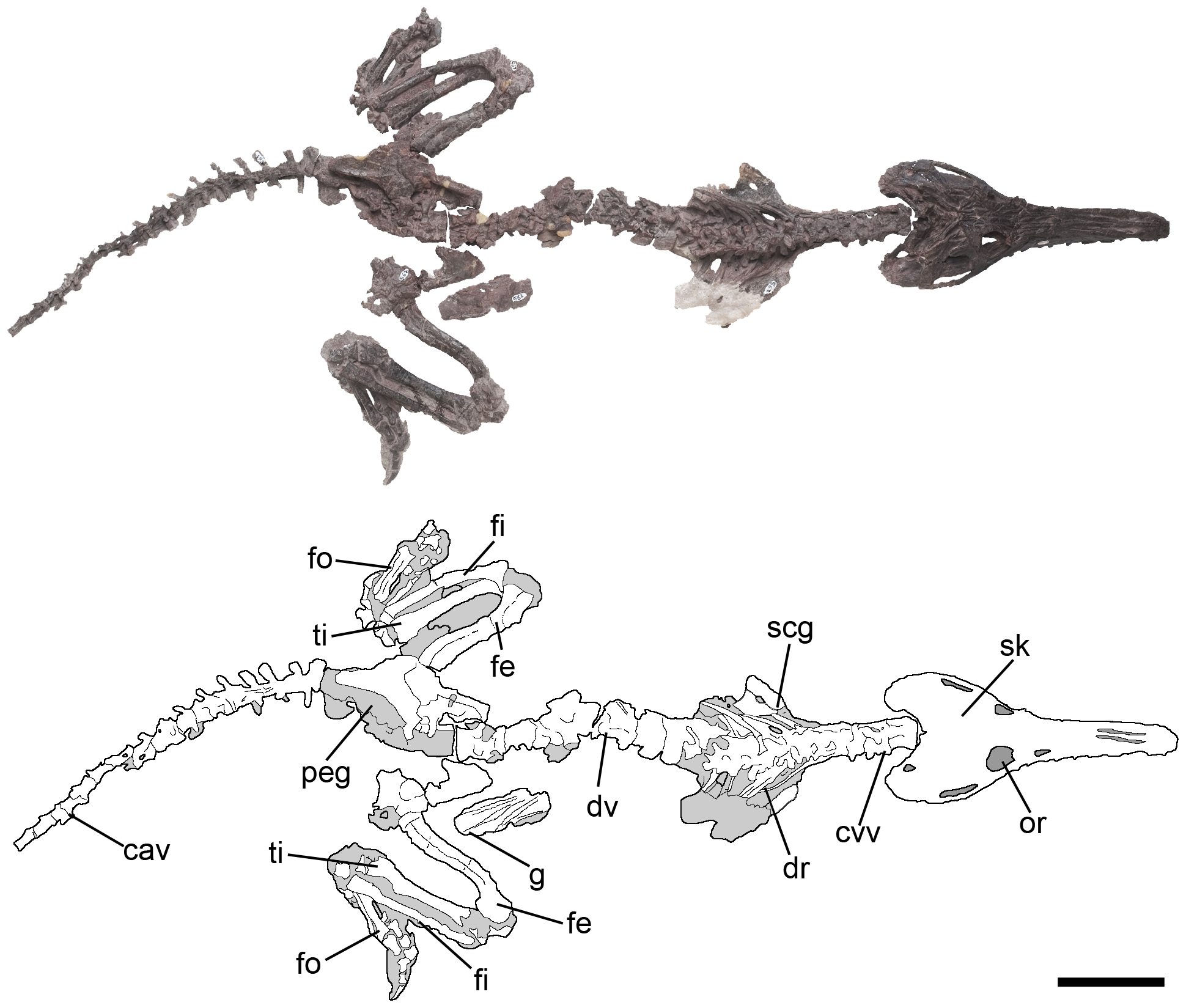
- Nearly complete skeleton of Pseudochampsa

Scientific classification
- Kingdom: Animalia
- Phylum: Chordata
- Class: Reptilia
- Clade: †Proterochampsia
- Family: †Proterochampsidae; Romer, 1966

Genera
- †Cerritosaurus; †Stenoscelida; †Tropidosuchus; †Proterochampsinae; †Proterochampsa; †Retymaijychampsa; †Sphodrosaurus?; †Rhadinosuchinae; †Chanaresuchus; †Gualosuchus; †Kuruxuchampsa; †Pinheirochampsa; †Pseudochampsa; †Rhadinosuchus

Synonyms
- Rhadinosuchidae Hoffstetter, 1955

= Proterochampsidae =

Proterochampsids Temporal range: Middle - Late Triassic, 242–205.6 Ma

Extinct family of reptiles

Proterochampsidae is a family of proterochampsian archosauriforms. Proterochampsids may have filled an ecological niche similar to modern crocodiles, and had a general crocodile-like appearance. They lived in what is now South America in the Middle and Late Triassic.

== Description ==
Proterochampsids have long, crocodile-like skulls. The posterior portion of the skull is wide while the snout is very narrow. Most proterochampsids also have downturned snouts. Like many early archosauriforms, they also have dermal armour.

Proterochampsids have small holes called dorsal fenestrae at the top of their skulls. Unlike other early archosauromorphs, they do not have a parietal foramin, which in many reptiles holds a parietal eye. The postorbital bones behind the eye sockets have thick, jagged crests. As another diagnostic feature of the group, the holes that allow the passage of the internal carotid artery through the braincase open at the sides of a bony projection called the basipterygoid process. Proterochampsids are primitive in that they have simple plate-like pelvises, but they lack small bones in the vertebra called intercentra that are common in earlier reptiles.

As in most archosaurs, distinguishing features can be seen in the shape of the ankle bones. A projection on the calcaneum bone called the calcaneal tuber is narrow and positioned downward relative to other lateral projections on the bone. The calcaneum also has a facet that attaches to both the fibula bone of the leg and another tarsal, or ankle bone. A hemicylindrical facet on the calcaneum attaches to another bone in the ankle called the astragalus. The astragalus has facets that attach to the tibia and fibula that are adjacent to each other.

== Classification ==
Proterochampsidae was named in 1966 by A.S. Romer in his book Vertebrate Paleontology, 3rd edition. The clade was defined as a stem-based taxon by María Trotteyn in 2011 as the most inclusive clade containing Chanaresuchus bonapartei and Proterochampsa barrionuevoi, but not Euparkeria capensis, Doswellia kaltenbachi, Passer domesticus (the house sparrow), or Crocodylus niloticus (the Nile crocodile). Members such as Proterochampsa and Cerritosaurus had been known for several decades prior to the family's creation. Proterochampsids were originally thought to be close relatives of crocodilians based on their similar appearance. In the following years, proterochampsids were frequently associated with Proterosuchia, another group of long-snouted Triassic archosauriforms. As phylogenetic studies became more common in the 1980s and 1990s, proterochampsids were found to be a distinct group closely related to true archosaurs. Recent studies have placed Proterochampsidae as either the sister taxon of Archosauria (the closest relatives of archosaurs), or the sister taxon of Archosauria and Euparkeria. In a 2011 study, the unusual Late Triassic archosauriform Doswellia has been placed as the closest relative of proterochampsids. Because doswelliids are more closely related to proterochampsids than to any other archosauriform, the two groups form their own clade.

Twelve species have been confirmed to belong to Proterochampsidae: Cerritosaurus binsfeldi, Chanaresuchus bonapartei, Gualosuchus reigi, Kuruxuchampsa dornellesi, Pinheirochampsa rodriguesi, Proterochampsa barrionuevoi, Proterochampsa nodosa, Pseudochampsa ischigualastensis, Retymaijychampsa beckerorum, Rhadinosuchus gracilis, Stenoscelida aurantiacus, and Tropidosuchus romeri. P. nodosa was assigned to its own genus Barberenachampsa in 2000, but it is generally still considered to be a species of Proterochampsa. Modern studies place Proterochampsids in a larger group called Proterochampsia. Under the classification of Kischlat and Schultz (1999), Cerritosaurus, Proterochampsa, and Tropidosuchus are basal forms, while Chanaresuchus, Gualosuchus, and Rhadinosuchus form the family Rhadinosuchidae. However, more recent studies reduce Rhadinosuchidae to a subfamily level as Rhadinosuchinae to be placed within Proterochampsidae and include advanced proterochampsid, e.g. Chanaresuchus and Rhadinosuchus. It was defined by Martin Ezcurra and colleagues in 2015 during the redescription of Rhadinosuchus as all archosauriforms more closely related to Rhadinosuchus gracilis and Chanaresuchus bonapartei than to Cerritosaurus binsfeldi, Tropidosuchus romeri, and Doswellia kaltenbachi. Below is a cladogram following the phylogenetic analysis of Ezcurra (2016) that recovered Doswelliidae as the sister taxon of Proterochampsidae (within Proterochampsia). Proterochampsia was found to be the sister taxon of Archosauria, whose living representatives consist of birds and crocodilians.

- Eucrocopoda
  - Dorosuchus neoetus
  - - Euparkeria capensis (Euparkeriidae)
    - - Dongusuchus efremovi
      - Yarasuchus deccanensis
    - - Archosauria
        - Avemetatarsalia
        - Pseudosuchia
          - Phytosauria
          - The rest of Pseudosuchia (incl. Koilamasuchus)
      - Proterochampsia
        - Doswelliidae
          - Vancleavea campi
          - - - Archeopelta arborensis
              - Tarjadia ruthae
            - - Doswellia kaltenbachi
              - Jaxtasuchus salomoni
        - Proterochampsidae
          - - Proterochampsa barrionuevoi
            - Proterochampsa nodosa
          - - Cerritosaurus binsfeldi
            - - Tropidosuchus romeri
              - Rhadinosuchinae
                - Pseudochampsa ischigualastensis
                - - Gualosuchus reigi
                  - - Chanaresuchus bonapartei
                    - Rhadinosuchus gracilis

=== Genera ===
Genus	Authority	Age	Location	Unit	Notes	Images
Cerritosaurus	Price (1946)	Ladinian	Brazil	Santa Maria Formation		
Chanaresuchus	Romer (1971)	Ladinian	Argentina	Chañares Formation		
Gualosuchus	Romer (1971)	Ladinian	Argentina	Chañares Formation		
Kuruxuchampsa	Paes-Neto et al. (2023)	Carnian	Brazil	Santa Maria Formation		
Pinheirochampsa	Paes-Neto et al. (2023)	Ladinian–Carnian	Brazil	Santa Maria Formation		
Proterochampsa	Reig (1959)	Norian	Argentina	Ischigualasto Formation	Includes Barberenachampsa as a subjective junior synonym according to most authors.	
Pseudochampsa	Trotteyn & Ezcurra (2014)	Norian	Argentina	Ischigualasto Formation		
Retymaijychampsa	Müller (2025)	Ladinian–Carnian	Brazil	Santa Maria Formation		
Rhadinosuchus	Huene (1942)	Ladinian	Brazil	Santa Maria Formation		
Stenoscelida	Müller et al. (2022)	Carnian/Norian	Brazil	Santa Maria Formation		
Tropidosuchus	Arcucci (1990)	Ladinian	Argentina	Chañares Formation		

== Sources ==
- A. S. Romer. 1966. Vertebrate Paleontology, 3rd edition. University of Chicago Press, Chicago 1-468
