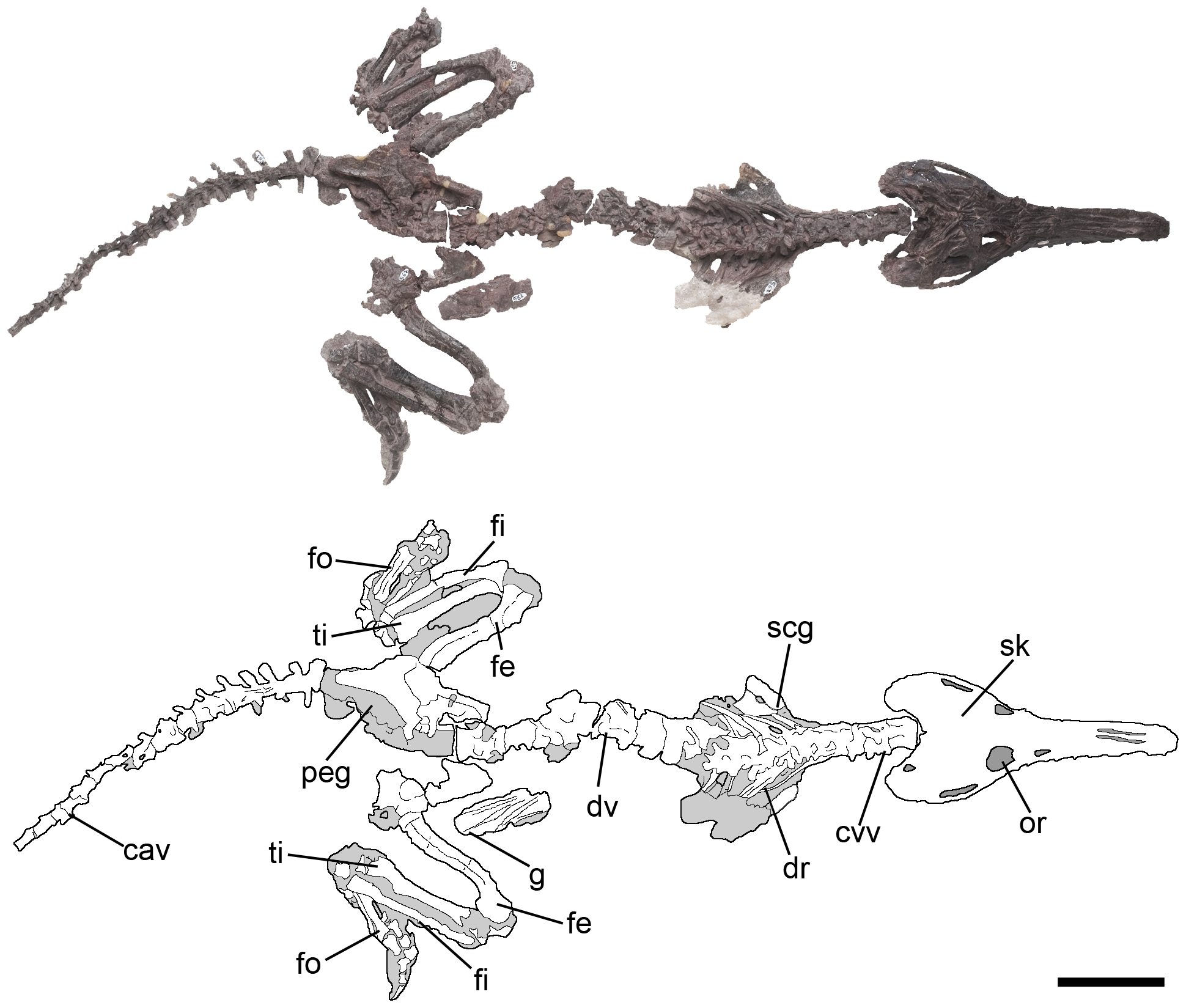
- Holotype skeleton of Pseudochampsa ischigualastensis

Scientific classification
- Kingdom: Animalia
- Phylum: Chordata
- Class: Reptilia
- Clade: Crocopoda
- Clade: Archosauriformes
- Clade: Eucrocopoda
- Clade: †Proterochampsia; Bonaparte, 1970

Families
- †Doswelliidae; †Proterochampsidae

= Proterochampsia =

Proterochampsia Temporal range: Middle - Late Triassic, 242–201.3 Ma

Extinct clade of reptiles

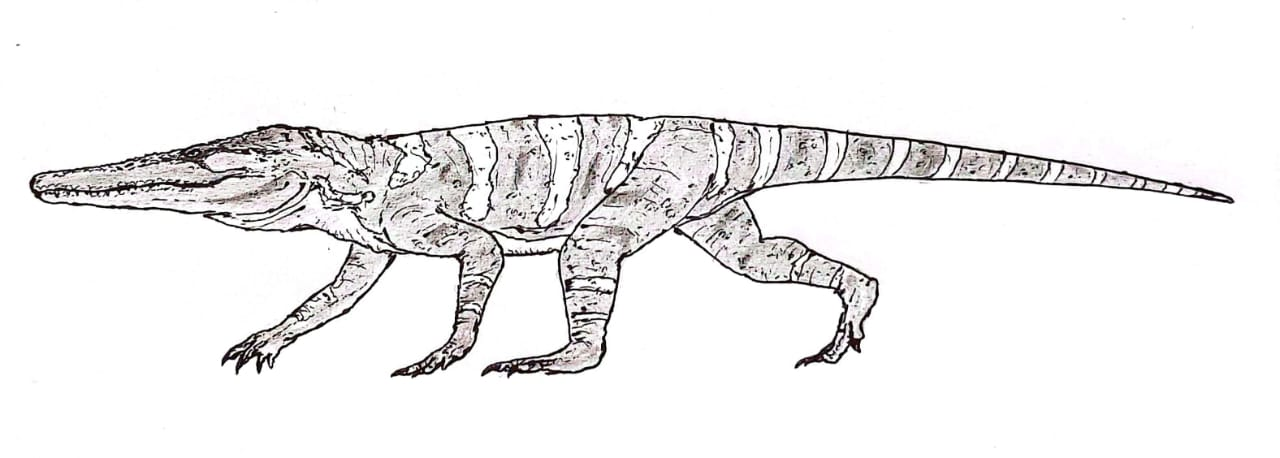
Life restoration of Proterochampsa barrionuevoi

Proterochampsia is a clade of early archosauriform reptiles from the Triassic period. It includes the Proterochampsidae (e.g. Proterochampsa, Chanaresuchus and Tropidosuchus) and probably also the Doswelliidae. Nesbitt (2011) defines Proterochampsia as a stem-based taxon that includes Proterochampsa barrionuevoi and all forms more closely related to it than Euparkeria capensis, Erythrosuchus africanus, Passer domesticus (the House Sparrow), or Crocodylus niloticus (the Nile crocodile). Therefore, the inclusion of Doswelliidae in it is dependent upon whether Doswellia and Proterochampsa form a monophyletic group to the exclusion of Archosauria and other related groups.

== Description ==
Nesbitt (2011) found that Proterochampsians share several distinguishing characteristics, or synapomorphies. A prominent ridge runs along the length of the jugal, a bone below the eye. Another ridge is present on the quadratojugal, a bone positioned toward the back of the skull behind the jugal. There is also a depression on the squamosal bone of the skull roof. The second metatarsal of the foot is wider than the other metatarsals. Proterochampsians lack a fifth digit on the foot; the fifth metatarsal is reduced to a small pointed bone. However, Nesbitt (2011) only considered Proterochampsia to include Proterochampsidae. Ezcurra (2016), who recovered a clade formed by Proterochampsidae and Doswelliidae, defined Proterochampsia by up-facing nostrils, maxilla-to-prefrontal contact, the tooth bearing part of the upper jaw being curved downwards, neck and front back vertebrae lacking a postzygodiapophyseal lamina, tibia with straight cnemial crest, fifth metatarsal that is not hook-shaped in its inner end, well developed foot phalanges on the fifth digit but with a poorly developed first phalanx, among other traits.

== Phylogeny ==
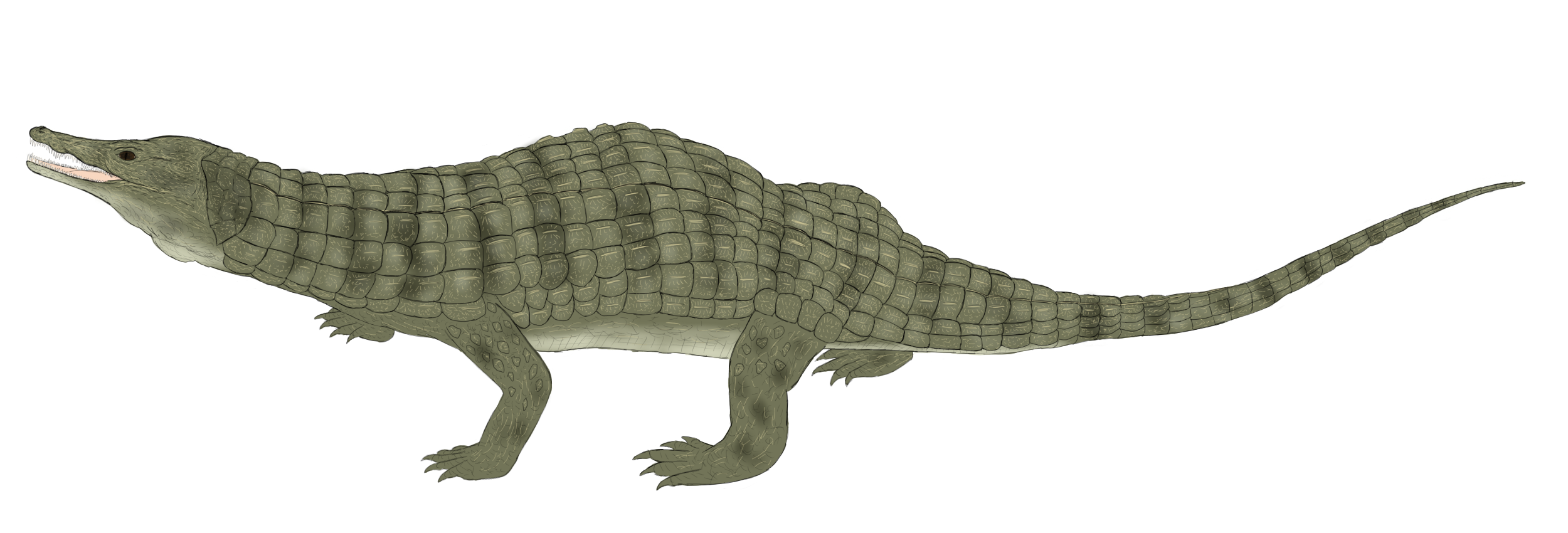
Life restoration of Doswellia kaltenbachi in mid-stride

One of the earliest phylogenies of proterochampsians was proposed by Kischlat and Schultz (1999). They considered Proterochampsia as a substitute name for Proterochampsidae, and recovered a monophyletic Rhadinosuchidae within this clade. However, more recent studies regard Proterochampsidae as the appropriate name for this clade (since no doswelliids were included), and use Rhadinosuchinae instead, as it is an internal clade of the family.

Dilkes and Arcucci (2012) combined data from several phylogenetic analyses of the Archosauriformes, such as Dilkes and Sues (2009), Ezcurra et al. (2010) and Nesbitt (2011), and added ten new characters to their matrix. The monophyly of Proterochampsia, which was restricted to proterochampsids, was supported by 12 unambiguous synapomorphies in their analysis, including the presence of dermal sculpturing on skull that consists of prominent ridges or tubercles on frontals, parietals and nasals; a contact between the maxilla and the prefrontal, separating lacrimal and nasal; a strongly convex dorsal margin of surangular and palatal teeth that are inserted into alveoli. Some of the synapomorphies recovered by Nesbitt (2011) were found to support either the node Cerritosaurus + Chanaresuchus or the node Tropidosuchus + Chanaresuchus.

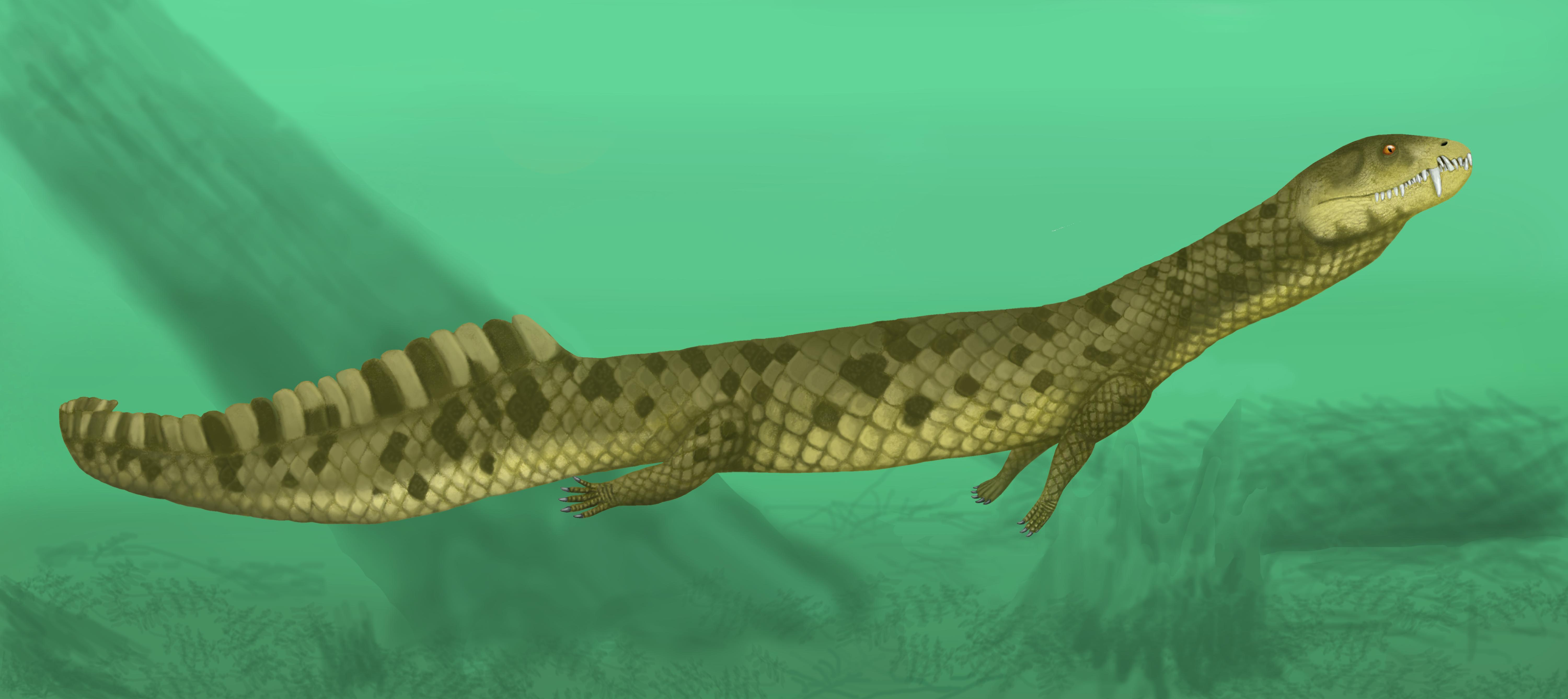
Life restoration of the aquatic Vancleavea campi

Trotteyn and Haro (2012) conducted a phylogenetic analysis of proterochampsians and other basal archosauriforms using only braincase characters, and found Doswellia, an unusual long-necked, heavily armored archosauriform from Virginia, to nest within Proterochampsia. A close relationship between Doswellia and proterochampsids was also found by Benton and Clark (1988) and Dilkes and Sues (2009). Trotteyn and Haro (2012) considered Proterochampsia to include proterochampsids and Doswellia, and proterochampsids to include all proterochampsians more closely related to Proterochampsa than to Doswellia. Ezcurra (2016) combined data several sets, including Nesbitt (2011) and Trotteyn and Haro (2012), and recovered a highly diverse Proterochampsia, which includes a deep split between doswelliids, including forms with aquatic adaptations, and proterochampsids. Proterochampsia was found to be the sister taxon of Archosauria, whose living representatives consist of birds and crocodilians. Multiple updated versions of the analysis performed by Ezcurra have been published, including the analysis of Paes-Neto and colleagues in their 2023 description of two new genera of proterochampsids, Kuruxuchampsa and Pinheirochampsa.

- Archosauriformes
  - Proterosuchidae
  - - Sarmatosuchus
    - - Cuyosuchus
      - - Erythrosuchidae
        - Eucrocopoda
          - Asperoris
          - Dorosuchus
          - - Euparkeria
            - - Halazhaisuchus
              - - Archosauria
                  - Avemetatarsalia
                  - Pseudosuchia
                - Proterochampsia
                  - Doswelliidae
                    - - Litorosuchus
                      - Vancleavea
                    - - Polymorphodon
                      - - Jaxtasuchus
                        - - Doswellia
                          - Rugarhynchos
                  - Proterochampsidae
                    - ? Stenoscelida
                    - - - Sphodrosaurus
                        - - Proterochampsa barrionuevoi
                          - Proterochampsa nodosa
                      - - ? Stenoscelida
                        - - Cerritosaurus
                          - - - ? Stenoscelida
                              - Tropidosuchus
                            - Rhadinosuchinae
                              - MCP-4195-V
                              - - - ? Stenoscelida
                                  - Gualosuchus
                                - - Pseudochampsa
                                  - - Chanaresuchus
                                    - - Kuruxuchampsa
                                      - Pinheirochampsa
                                      - Rhadinosuchus
