= Pinheirochampsa =

Pinheirochampsa Temporal range: Mid - Late Triassic

Scientific classification
- Domain: Eukaryota
- Kingdom: Animalia
- Phylum: Chordata
- Class: Reptilia
- Clade: Archosauromorpha
- Clade: Archosauriformes
- Clade: †Proterochampsia
- Family: †Proterochampsidae
- Genus: †Pinheirochampsa
- Species: †P. rodriguesi

Binomial name
- †Pinheirochampsa rodriguesi Paes-Noto et al., 2023

Extinct genus of reptiles

Pinheirochampsa is an extinct genus of archosauriform reptile from the Mid-Late Triassic-aged Santa Maria Formation of Brazil. It contains a single species, P. rodriguesi.
