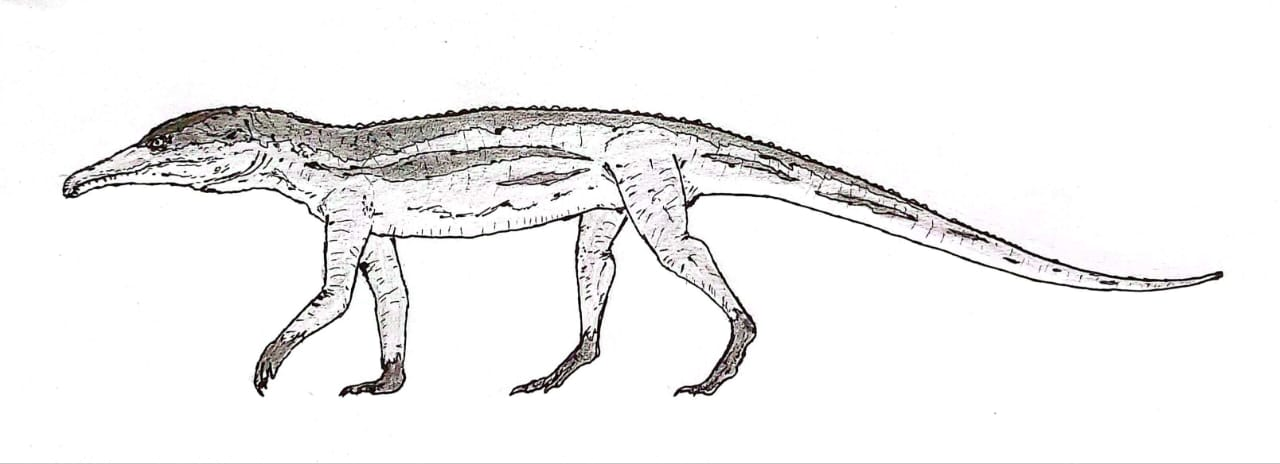
- Rhadinosuchus gracilis

Scientific classification
- Domain: Eukaryota
- Kingdom: Animalia
- Phylum: Chordata
- Class: Reptilia
- Clade: Archosauromorpha
- Clade: Archosauriformes
- Clade: †Proterochampsia
- Family: †Proterochampsidae
- Subfamily: †Rhadinosuchinae
- Genus: †Rhadinosuchus; Huene, 1942

Species
- †R. gracilis Huene, 1942

= Rhadinosuchus =

Rhadinosuchus Temporal range: 231–226 Ma

Extinct genus of reptiles

Rhadinosuchus is an extinct genus of proterochampsian archosauriform reptile from the Late Triassic. It is known only from the type species Rhadinosuchus gracilis, reposited in Munich, Germany. The fossil includes an incomplete skull and fragments of post-cranial material. Hosffstetter (1955), Kuhn (1966), Reig (1970) and Bonaparte (1971) hypothesized it to be synonymous with Cerritosaurus, but other characteristics suggest it is closer to Chanaresuchus and Gualosuchus, while it is certainly different from Proterochampsa and Barberenachampsa. The small size indicates it is a young animal, making it hard to classify.

The fossil was collected at the Sanga 6 site (part of the Santa Maria Formation), in Santa Maria, Paleorrota, Brazil. It was collected by Friedrich von Huene in 1938. The remains are dated to the Triassic Period.

== Description ==
=== Skull ===
The skull of Rhadinosuchus had an estimated length of 11.0 centimeters (4.3 inches), with missing portions reconstructed based on its relative Chanaresuchus. It was generally very similar to the skulls of Chanaresuchus and Gualosuchus. The premaxilla (a toothed bone at the tip of the snout) was long, low, and slightly downturned, though the tooth row is too poorly preserved to estimate the number of teeth present. The maxilla (a toothed bone at the side of the snout) was also a very elongated bone. The maxilla had a long anterior process (forward branch), a short and tapering ascending process (upwards branch), and a long and tapering horizontal process (rear branch). The surface of the anterior process has a uniquely bulged area, though this may just be a result of damage to the bone. The upper portion of the maxilla abruptly transitions between a vertically-oriented outer surface and a horizontally-oriented upper surface, and this abrupt transition is only otherwise present in Chanaresuchus and Gualosuchus. Between the ascending and horizontal processes, the skull has a large and rectangular hole known as an antorbital fenestra. The lower front corner of this hole has a thin basin (an antorbital fossa) edge by a ridge on both processes. Rhadinosuchus is practically unique among proterochampsids due to possessing an antorbital fossa on both processes; most other proterochampsids (and non-archosaur archosauriforms in general) only have it on the ascending process, not the horizontal process. There may have been eight or nine teeth in the maxilla, although a precise count is uncertain. Preserved teeth were typical of other archosauriformes, as they were curved, serrated, and set in deep sockets.

The nasal (a plate-like bone forming the upper edge of the snout) is long and thin. It was textured by several longitudinal ridges which converge at a point near the rear of the bone, as in Chanaresuchus, Gualosuchus, and Pseudochampsa. The front of the nasal forms most of the edge of the nares (nostril holes), which were oriented upwards. A long groove known as a narial fossa extended out from the rear edge of the nares, as in other proterochampsids. The lacrimal (an L-shaped bone at the rear upper corner of the antorbital fenestra) had a large antorbital fossa, similar to Chanaresuchus but unlike other proterochampsids. It also had a thick crest extending from its upper edge down long its lower branch. The frontal (a plate-like bone above the eyes) was fragmentary while the jugal (the "cheek bone", below the eyes) was very thin, most similar to that of Tropidosuchus among proterochampsids. The quadratojugal (an L-shaped bone at the rear lower corner of the skull) had a notch at its apex like Chanaresuchus and Gualosuchus, though the notch was smaller than in these two taxa. A bone preserved near the quadratojugal was originally identified as a quadrate, although it does not closely resemble other proterochampsid quadrates.

Preserved portions of the braincase were generally similar to those of other advanced archosauriforms. However, there were a pair of holes for the exit of the hypoglossal nerve, like Proterochampsa but unlike doswelliids, which only have one large hole. The lower jaw was very long and slender, though the rear portion was not preserved. It was straight, and its outer and lower surfaces meet at an abrupt right angle, possibly related to the similarly abrupt transition on the snout. The front tip of the jaw has a large pit, which is autapomorphic (unique) to Rhadinosuchus compared to other archosauriforms. In addition, Rhadinosuchus had a larger number of teeth in the lower jaw (23) compared to other proterochampsids (15-18), but fewer than Doswellia (35). The teeth were similar to those of the upper jaw, apart from the fact that they were unserrated.

=== Postcranium ===
Fossilized material from the rest of the body is much more sparse than that from the skull. A possible axis vertebrae is attached to the rear of the skull. A centrum (main, spool-shaped component) of a vertebra further down the neck has also been preserved. This centrum was long and low, with a keel on its lower edge and no evidence of bevelled facets for intercentra. In these features it generally resembles the cervical vertebrae of other proterochampsians. A fragment of a cervical rib was preserved, as well as several thin and gently curved gastralia. An hourglass-shaped metatarsal (foot bone) was also preserved. It was large and robust, very similar to the second metatarsal of Chanaresuchus, meaning that it was likely the second metatarsal. There were also a pair of thick, rectangular osteoderms (bony scutes) present in the specimen. They may have formed a single row along the midline of the animal's back (based on other proterochampsids), but this interpretation cannot be confirmed or denied in Rhadinosuchus, as they were displaced from the rest of the bones.
