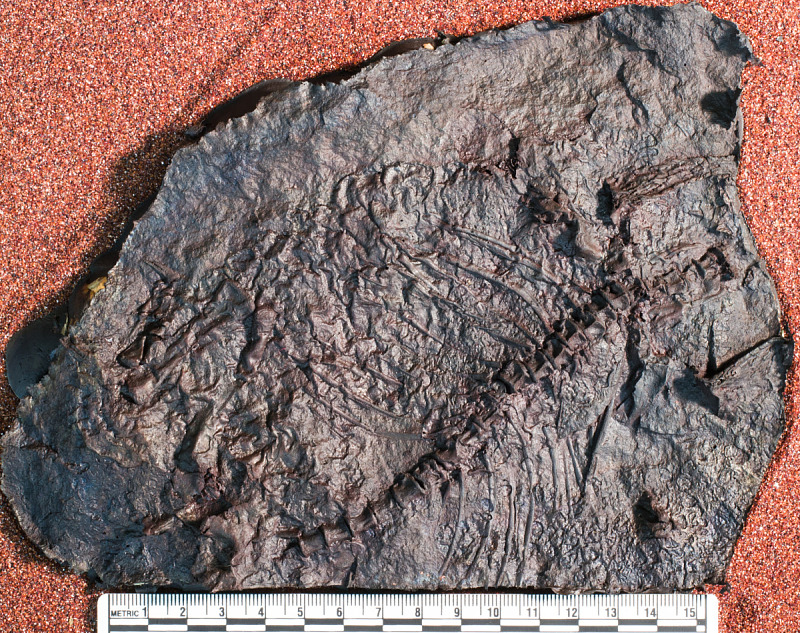
- Fossil

Scientific classification
- Kingdom: Animalia
- Phylum: Chordata
- Class: Reptilia
- Clade: †Proterochampsia
- Family: †Doswelliidae
- Genus: †Sphodrosaurus; Colbert, 1960
- Species: †S. pennsylvanicus

Binomial name
- †Sphodrosaurus pennsylvanicus Colbert, 1960

= Sphodrosaurus =

Sphodrosaurus Temporal range: Late Triassic, ~230–205.6 Ma

Extinct genus of Triassic reptiles

Sphodrosaurus is an extinct genus of basal archosauriform reptiles from the Late Triassic-aged New Oxford Formation (not the Brunswick Formation as initially suggested) of Pennsylvania. The type species is S. pennsylvanicus, described by Edwin Colbert in 1960. The holotype (NMN, Franklin and Marshall College 2321; the cast is listed under AMNH 7601) consists of a partial skeleton including the back of the skull, the vertebral column, all of the ribs, all of the hindlimbs and part of the upper forelimbs; Sphodrosaurus was originally believed to have been a member of the Procolophonidae while more recently Sphodrosaurus was believed to be a basal member of the Diapsida by most authors starting with Sues et al. (1993), or a member of the Rhynchosauria (Baird, 1986). In 2022, Ezcurra & Sues redescribed the holotype in detail and placed it in a phylogenetic analysis with other Triassic diapsid reptiles, where it was found as the basalmost doswellid.
