= Kuruxuchampsa =

Kuruxuchampsa Temporal range: Late Triassic

Scientific classification
- Domain: Eukaryota
- Kingdom: Animalia
- Phylum: Chordata
- Class: Reptilia
- Clade: Archosauromorpha
- Clade: Archosauriformes
- Clade: †Proterochampsia
- Family: †Proterochampsidae
- Genus: †Kuruxuchampsa
- Species: †K. dornellesi

Binomial name
- †Kuruxuchampsa dornellesi Paes-Noto et al., 2023

Extinct genus of reptiles

Kuruxuchampsa is an extinct genus of archosauriform reptile from the Late Triassic-aged Santa Maria Formation of Brazil. It contains a single species, K. dornellesi.
