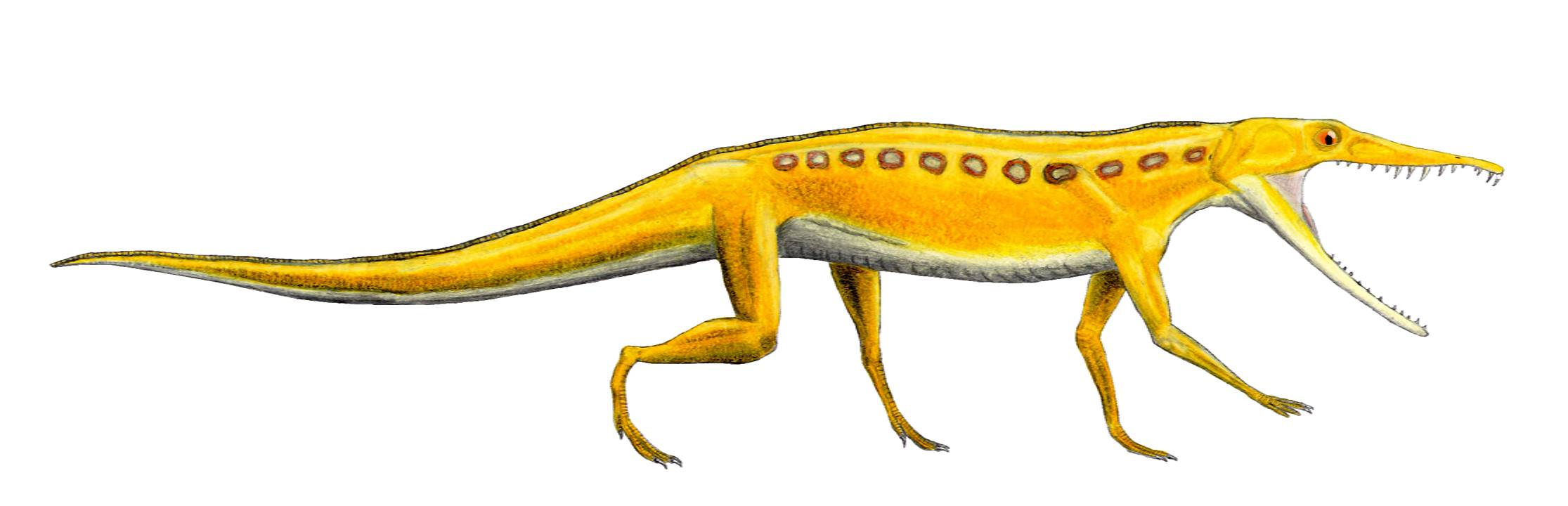
- Life restoration of Chanaresuchus bonapartei

Scientific classification
- Kingdom: Animalia
- Phylum: Chordata
- Class: Reptilia
- Clade: †Proterochampsia
- Family: †Proterochampsidae
- Subfamily: †Rhadinosuchinae
- Genus: †Chanaresuchus; Romer, 1971

Type species
- †Chanaresuchus bonapartei Romer, 1971

= Chanaresuchus =

Chanaresuchus Temporal range: Middle Triassic, 236–234 Ma

Extinct genus of reptiles

Chanaresuchus is an extinct genus of proterochampsid archosauriform. It was of modest size for a proterochampsian, being on average just over a meter in length. The type species is Chanaresuchus bonapartei was named in 1971. Its fossils were found in from the early Carnian-age Chañares Formation in La Rioja Province, Argentina . Chanaresuchus appears to be one of the most common archosauriforms from the Chañares Formation due to the abundance of specimens referred to the genus. Much of the material has been found by the La Plata-Harvard expedition of 1964–65. Chanaresuchus is the most well-described proterochampsid in the subfamily Rhadinosuchinae.

A second proposed species, C. ischigualastensis, was named in 2012 from the late Carnian-age Ischigualasto Formation, was briefly assigned to Chanaresuchus before being moved to its own genus Pseudochampsa in 2014. C. bonapartei has been reported from the Santa Maria Formation in Brazil, but the Brazilian fossils were given their own genus Kuruxuchampsa in 2023.

== Description ==
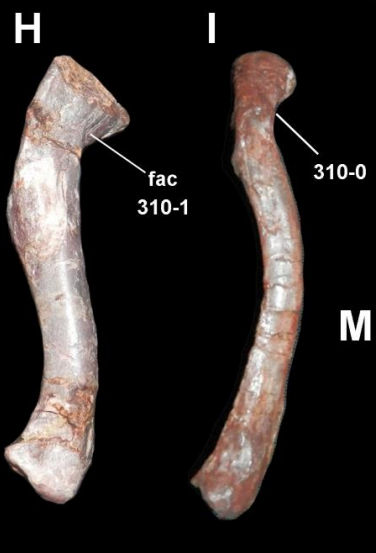
Proximal end of right tibia of Chanaresuchus bonapartei (PVL 4575) as seen from two different angles

Chanaresuchus has a low, elongate skull that is characteristic of proterochampsians. The skull is quite broad posteriorly with a narrow snout, varying in length from around 165mm to 260mm in the largest individuals. The nares are slit-like and positioned away from the tip of the rostrum, farther up the skull. The premaxilla is slightly down-curved. The skull table is highly ornamented in larger specimens, with the dermal bones well sculptured. The palate of Chanaresuchus has two elongate choanae. Two small openings anterior to the choanae may be anterior palatine foramina that could have been used for access to vomeronasal organs. The secondary palate formed between these two sets of openings may have been an adaptation for breathing through the snout while underwater.

Unlike other proterochampsians and early archosaurs, Chanaresuchus had little body armor. The only osteoderms found are small and scale-like, forming a single row down the back. They run from the neck to the hip, ending at the last presacral vertebra. They most likely continue down the tail, although tail osteoderms are not preserved in any specimens. There are roughly three osteoderms overlying each vertebra.

The foot of Chanaresuchus differs from other related archosaurs in that the inner toes are inlarged, whereas other primitive archosaurs retain a more symmetrical pattern. The first digit is reduced but robust, the second digit is the thickest, and the third digit is the longest, although somewhat slender in comparison to the others. The fourth digit is very slim and the fifth consists of only a metatarsal spur.

== Paleoecology ==
A semiaquatic lifestyle similar to phytosaurs and modern day crocodilians has been proposed for Chanaresuchus, as is suggested by the secondary palate and upward facing orbits and nostrils. However, some evidence, such as a lack of aquatic amphibians found from the Chañares Formation, suggests that the area was relatively dry during the time of deposition. A terrestrial lifestyle is possible, since the osteoderm structure of Chanaresuchus is compact, more similar to terrestrial squamates than to crocodilians.

The depositional environment of the locality from which specimens of Chanaresuchus have been found was in close proximity to an area of high volcanic activity, because it was in an active rift basin. It is possible that all of the recovered specimens had died in a single event of mass mortality and may have been buried on a fluvial strandline. The mortality-causing event was most likely linked to regional volcanic activity.

The locality from which specimens of C. bonapartei have been found is well known for its abundance of tetrapods. Theraspids include the dicynodont Dinodontosaurus, and cynodonts such as Probainognathus and Massetognathus, the latter being the most abundant taxon of the locality. Archosaurs were less common, though highly diverse. Ornithodirans include Lewisuchus (= Pseudolagosuchus), Lagerpeton, and Marasuchus. Other archosaurs include Gracilisuchus and Luperosuchus. Another proterochampsian, which was named alongside Chanaresuchus in 1971, is Gualosuchus. It is very similar in appearance to Chanaresuchus, differing only in size and cranial proportions.
