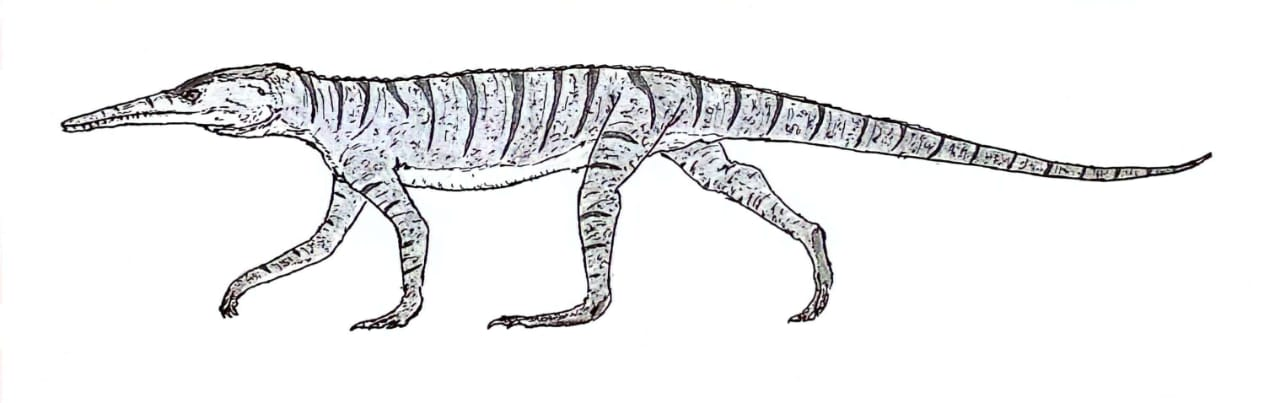
- Tropidosuchus romeri

Scientific classification
- Kingdom: Animalia
- Phylum: Chordata
- Class: Reptilia
- Clade: †Proterochampsia
- Family: †Proterochampsidae
- Genus: †Tropidosuchus; Arcucci, 1990

Type species
- †Tropidosuchus romeri Arcucci, 1990

= Tropidosuchus =

Tropidosuchus Temporal range: Middle Triassic ~236–234 Ma

Extinct genus of reptiles

Tropidosuchus is an extinct genus of carnivorous archosauriforms from the Middle Triassic epoch (Anisian to Ladinian stage). It is a proterochampsid which lived in what is now Argentina. It is known from the holotype PVL 4601, which consists of partial skeleton. It was found in the Chañares Formation and its type locality is the Chañares River. It was first named by A. B. Arcucci in 1990 and the type species is Tropidosuchus romeri.

== Description ==
Autoapomorphic to T. romeri are a short preorbital region that is less than half of the length of the skull, well-developed anterolateral processes of the frontals, maxillae restricted to the lateral wall of the rostrum, premaxillae that lack anteroventrally oriented alveolar margins, and a skull roof ornamentation made up of crests that do not have a radial arrangement. A characteristic shared with rhadinosuchines, the crest on the lateral surface of the jugal is.
