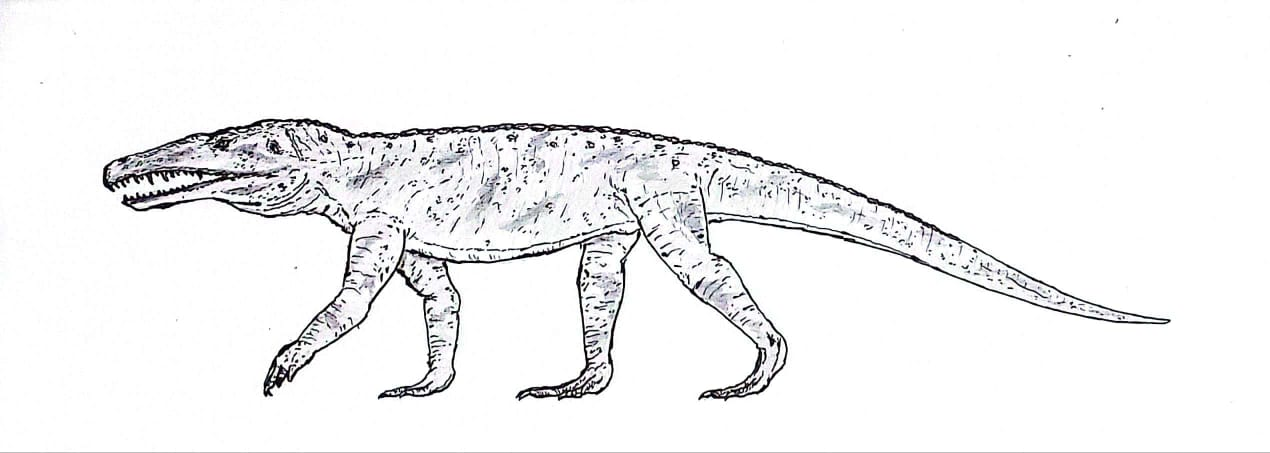
- Cerritosaurus binsfeldi

Scientific classification
- Domain: Eukaryota
- Kingdom: Animalia
- Phylum: Chordata
- Class: Reptilia
- Clade: Archosauromorpha
- Clade: Archosauriformes
- Clade: †Proterochampsia
- Family: †Proterochampsidae
- Genus: †Cerritosaurus; Price, 1946

Type species
- †Cerritosaurus binsfeldi Price, 1946

= Cerritosaurus =

Cerritosaurus Temporal range: Late Triassic ~235–205.6 Ma

Extinct genus of reptiles

Cerritosaurus is a genus of proterochampsid archosauromorph from the Late Triassic. It has been found in the Santa Maria Formation, in the Geopark of Paleorrota, Brazil. It is represented by one species.

It was collected in 1941 by Antonio Binsfeld, in Sanga da Alemoa. Nearby, there is a small mountain called the Cerrito, after which the genus is named.
