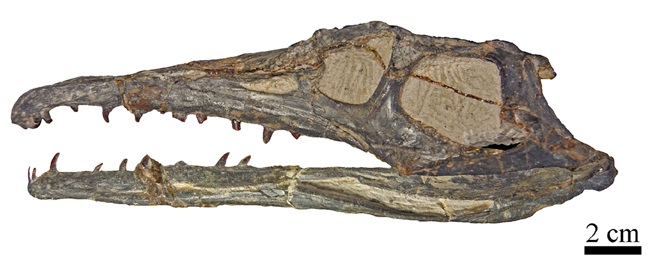
- Skull

Scientific classification
- Kingdom: Animalia
- Phylum: Chordata
- Class: Reptilia
- Clade: †Proterochampsia
- Family: †Proterochampsidae
- Subfamily: †Rhadinosuchinae
- Genus: †Gualosuchus; Romer 1971

Type species
- †Gualosuchus reigi Romer 1971

= Gualosuchus =

Gualosuchus Temporal range: Middle Triassic ~242–235 Ma

Extinct genus of reptiles

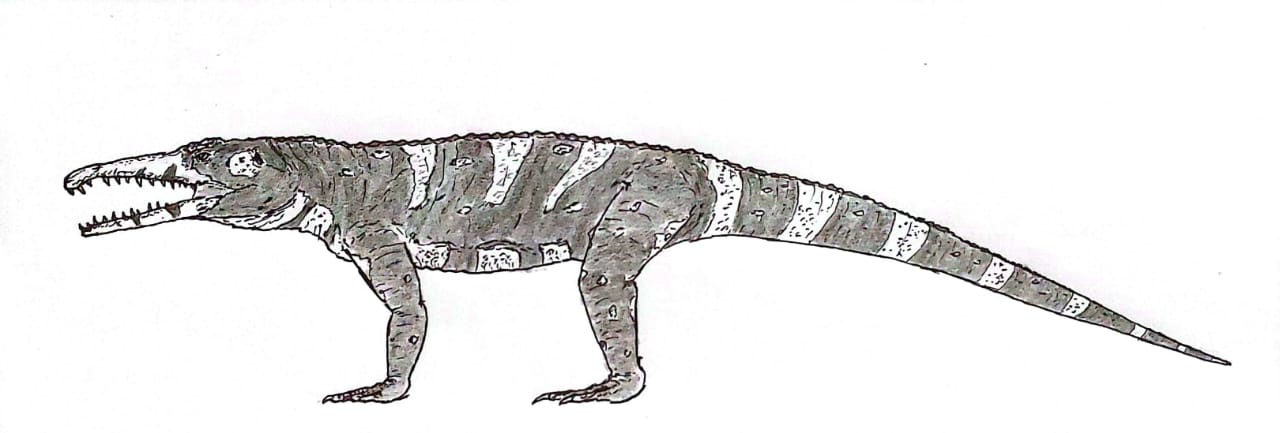
Reconstruction of Gualosuchus reigi

Gualosuchus is an extinct genus of proterochampsian archosauriform from the Middle Triassic Chañares Formation of Argentina. The type and only species is Gualosuchus reigi, named by paleontologist Alfred Romer in 1971. Its skull length is 40 cm long making it quite a large proterochampsids. Gualosuchus also said to have a more robust humerus and tibia compared to other proterochampsids.
