= Postparietal =

Fish and tetrapod skull bones

The skull of Xenotosuchus, a temnospondyl amphibian. Postparietals are in deep pink, at the back of the skull.

Postparietals are cranial bones present in fish and many tetrapods. Although initially a pair of bones, many lineages possess postparietals which were fused into a single bone. The postparietals were dermal bones situated along the midline of the skull, behind the parietal bones. They formed part of the rear edge of the skull roof, and the lateral edge of each postparietal often contacts the tabular and supratemporal bones. In fish, the postparietals are elongated, typically the largest components of the skull roof. Tetrapods possessed shorter postparietals, which were reduced further and shifted towards the braincase in amniotes. At several points in synapsid evolution, the postparietals fused to each other and the tabulars during embryological development. This fusion produces the interparietal bone, which is inherited by mammals. Postparietals are common in extinct amphibians and early reptiles. However, most living amphibians (of the group Lissamphibia) and living reptiles (of the group Sauria) lack postparietal bones, with a few exceptions. Among fishes, the bone is also known as the dermosupraoccipital.

== Evolution ==
=== Fish and amphibians ===
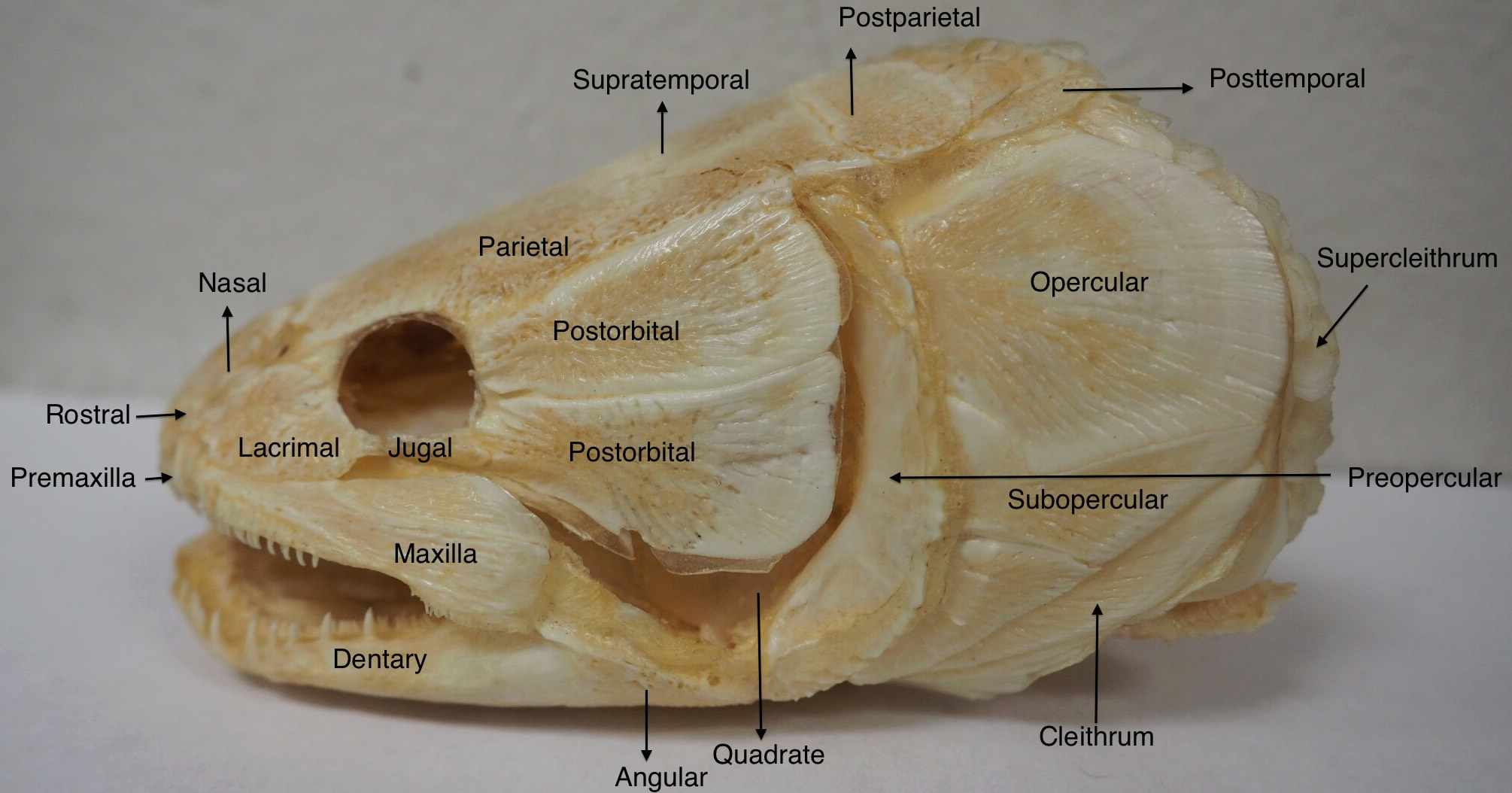
The skull of a bowfin (Amia calva), one of the most basal living actinopterygiians. Skull bones are labelled based on tetrapod homologies.

Watson & Day (1916)'s "orthodox" interpretation of fish skulls argued that fish lacked independent postparietals, with the elongated paired midline bones at the back of the skull being interpreted as parietals. On the other hand, Westoll (1938) proposed an alternative interpretation which identified the bones as postparietals based on comparisons between early tetrapods and their sarcopterygian ancestors. This latter interpretation has usurped the "orthodox" interpretation and is currently more widespread among paleontologists Although the generally large size of fish postparietals are inconsistent with the smaller postparietals of tetrapods, there are many factors supporting the identification of the large posterior midline elements as postparietals, rather than parietals. These include their contact with tabulars and supratemporals, the fact that they are positioned behind the bones which surround the parietal foramen (i.e. the parietal bones), and how transitional taxa show apparent homology with tetrapod postparietals and the large posterior midline elements of fish. Studies of Ichthyostega, Elpistostege, and Edops in particular have demonstrated this concept. One objection to this interpretation is that the single midline postparietal of Ichthyostega has a transverse bend of the lateral line, which in fish typically occurs on extrascapular elements (plates at the back of the skull formed from enlarged neck scales). Proponents of the "orthodox" interpretation used this to argue that the unpaired postparietal of Icthyostega is a modified extrascapular element not homologous to what they identify as the "parietals" of fish. However, this is more easily explained by a simple shift in the position of the lateral line, as the postparietals of Icthyostega are otherwise identical in proportion and position (and therefore considered homologous) to the large paired posterior midline elements of fish.

The postparietal has been homologised with the dermosupraoccipital of fishes.

Many sarcopterygian fish (including living coelacanths) possess a large, robust plate at the back of the skull known as a postparietal shield. This plate consists mostly of the large postparietals along its midline, with smaller tabular bones and one or more supratemporal bones along its edge. The postparietal shield often articulates with the rest of the skull through a mobile joint. As sarcopterygians acquire more derived features and eventually evolve into tetrapods, the postparietals gradually shrink, losing their status as the largest midline elements of the skull and allowing the more anteriorly-situated parietal bones (and the newly acquired frontal bones) to acquire that status. The postparietals also becomes more solidly attached to the parietals. Most lissamphibians lack postparietals, with the exception of a few anurans such as Pelates (spadefoot toads) and Bombina (fire-bellied toads). In diadectomorphs, the postparietals fuse to each other. The seymouriamorph Discosauriscus has a high degree of interspecific variation in regards to postparietal fusion; they may either fuse with each other, not at all, or with the adjacent tabulars but not with each other. Closer to the base of amniotes, the postparietal shifts from the dorsal portion of the skull to the occipital (braincase) portion, sloping downwards in the process.

=== Synapsids ===
The skull of Dimetrodon (an early synapsid with a single midline postparietal) in occipital view

Early synapsids inherited postparietals (sometimes paired) from their non-amniote ancestors. Embryological data indicates that the interparietal bone of mammals forms from the fusion of four bones during early development: a pair of medial neural crest elements edged by lateral mesoderm elements. The medial neural crest-derived pair are considered homologous to the postparietals of other vertebrates, while the lateral mesoderm bones are considered homologous to the tabular bones. In almost all mammals, all four bones are fused to each other by the time of birth, and in many cases they additionally fuse to the parietal and supraoccipital in adulthood. Many non-mammalian synapsids have three bones in the interparietal region as adults: one midline bone and two lateral bones. In these situations, the midline bone (often also termed an interparietal) is a fused postparietal while the lateral bones are tabulars. Independently-derived fusion between paired postparietals and/or the adjacent tabulars is common among synapsids, meaning that many different lineages have one, three, or four bones in the region which makes up the mammalian interparietal. In rare cases there are two interparietal bones, formed when left and right postparietals each fuse to their corresponding tabular, but not each other.

=== Reptiles ===
The postparietals continue to shrink and move further back in the skull in reptiles, no longer forming any contribution to the ceiling of the brain cavity. Small paired or fused postparietals are common in Carboniferous and Permian basal sauropsids, like Petrolacosaurus, and neodiapsids, like Youngina. Postparietals were subsequently lost at the base of Sauria, the expansive diapsid subgroup containing all living species of reptiles. Archosauriforms (and their sister taxon Tasmaniosaurus) briefly reacquired postparietals in the form of a single fused bone. As in synapsids, this bone has sometimes been termed an interparietal. Proterosuchids, erythrosuchids, euparkeriids, and Asperoris are all known to have possessed interparietals, while the bone was absent in proterochampsids, Doswellia, Vancleavea, Litorosuchus, most or all phytosaurs, and archosaurs. The only true archosaur generally considered to possess an interparietal as an adult is a single specimen of Gracilisuchus. Paired postparietals have also been observed in Alligator mississippiensis embryos, although they are incorporated into the supraoccipital by the time of hatching. One proposal used developmental data to argue that the "parietal" of birds was actually derived from postparietals. However, subsequent review provided evidence against that hypothesis by demonstrating that birds had inherited a consistent relationship between the skull roof and brain cavity; this relationship excluded the postparietals from the brain cavity (at least in reptiles) and supported the traditional interpretation that the parietal of birds was homologous to that of other reptiles.
