= Thecodontia =

Obsolete order of reptiles

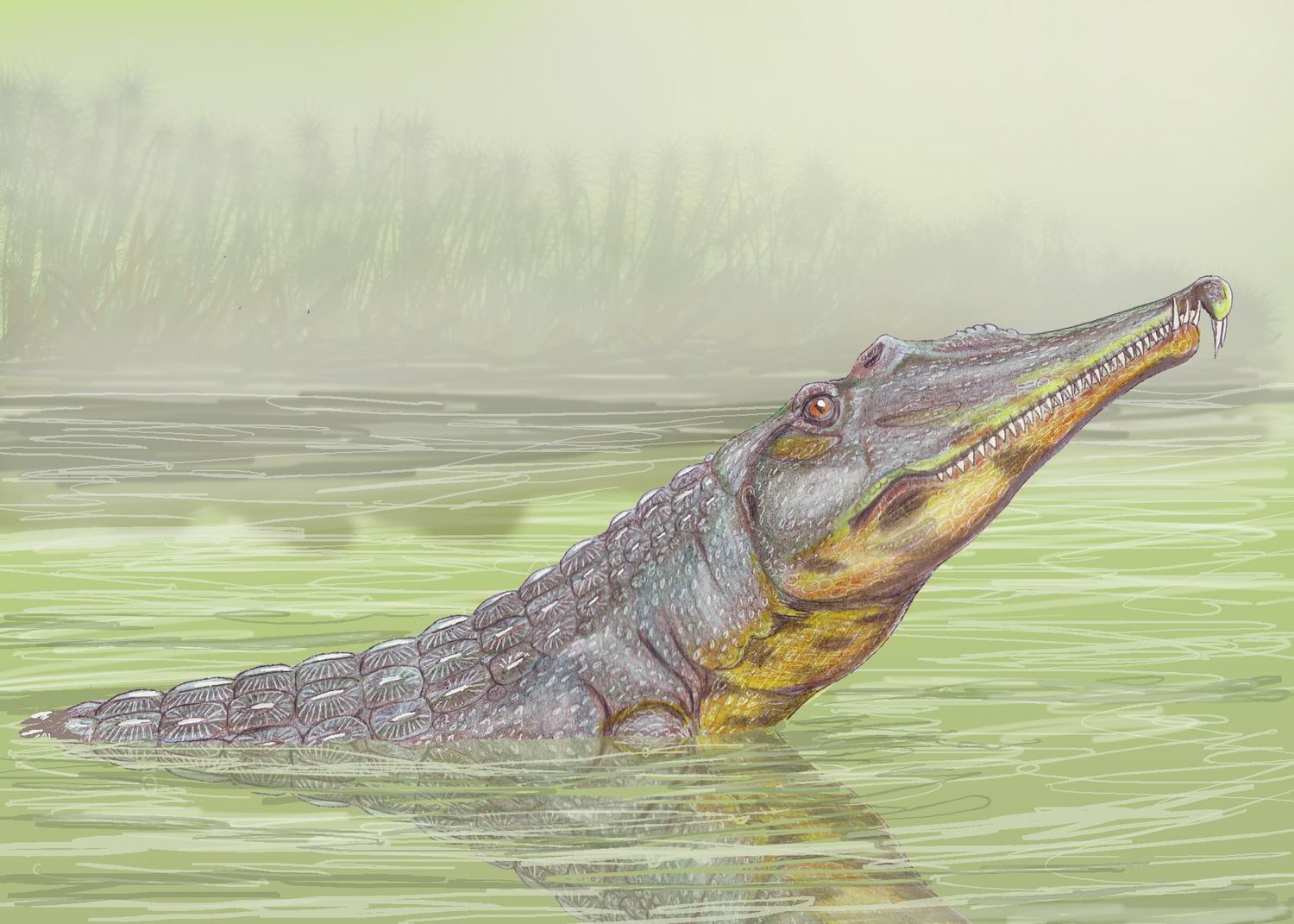
Rutiodon, one of the aquatic and superficially crocodile-like phytosaurs

Thecodontia (meaning 'socket-teeth'), now considered an obsolete taxonomic grouping, was formerly used to describe a diverse "order" of early archosaurian reptiles that first appeared in the latest Permian period and flourished until the end of the Triassic period. All of them were built somewhat like crocodiles but with shorter skulls, more erect pose and usually somewhat lighter. The group includes the ancestors of dinosaurs, pterosaurs, and crocodilians, as well as a number of extinct forms that did not give rise to any descendants. The term thecodont is still used as an anatomical description of the tooth morphology seen in these species and others.

== Definition ==
Thecodonts are characterized by certain shared primitive features, such as the antorbital fenestra (an opening on each side of the skull between the eye sockets and the nostrils) and teeth in sockets. The name thecodont is Greek for "socket-tooth", referring to the fact that thecodont teeth were set in sockets in the jawbones; an archosaurian characteristic that was inherited by the dinosaurs. While the taxon Thecodontia is obsolete, the term thecodont remains in use as an anatomical description of teeth in bony sockets; in addition to species formerly in this group (such as crocodiles and dinosaurs), mammals also possess thecodont dentition, which evolved independently.

They constitute an evolutionary grade of animals, a "wastebasket taxon" for any archosaur other than a crocodilian, a pterosaur, or a dinosaur (any basal archosaur). Because the cladistic paradigm only recognises monophyletic taxa as natural groups, and because thecodonts are a paraphyletic group (they include among their descendants animals that are not thecodonts), the term is no longer used as a formal name by most paleontologists, but it can still be found in older (and even fairly recent) books as a convenient shorthand for the basal archosaurs.

== Taxonomic history ==
Traditionally, the order Thecodontia Owen, 1859 was divided into four suborders, the Proterosuchia (early primitive forms, another paraphyletic assemblage), Phytosauria (large crocodile-like semi-aquatic animals), the Aetosauria (armoured herbivores), and the Pseudosuchia, a wastebasket taxon intended to be paraphyletic to all later archosaurs (see e.g., Alfred Sherwood Romer's Vertebrate Paleontology and Edwin H. Colbert's Evolution of the Vertebrates). Of these, only phytosaurs and aetosaurs constitute monophyletic groups, and the term Pseudosuchia was simply a catch-all term for any species that didn't fit in one of the other three sub-orders. Pseudosuchia as used in recent literature is a stem-based taxon that includes crocodile-line archosaurs, or all archosaurs (including crocodilians) that are more closely related to crocodilians than birds.

Robert Carroll, in his book Vertebrate Paleontology and Evolution (1988), replaces Pseudosuchia with Rauisuchia, Ornithosuchia (containing Ornithosuchidae and non-dinosaur, non-pterosaur Ornithodira), and the traditional category incertae sedis (of uncertain placement), while retaining the other three suborders. This is the last major textbook that still recognizes the taxon Thecodontia, as it uses a traditional Linnaean based taxonomy derived from that of Romer.

In his 1982 thesis on amniote phylogeny, Brian Gardiner attempted to define Thecodontia within a cladistic framework, containing crocodilians and haemothermata (mammals and birds), thus giving the old name to a new concept. All more recent cladistic studies (e.g., Jacques Gauthier 1986) have confirmed that Thecodontia as construed by Gardiner is a polyphyletic taxon, the members of which are not united by any shared derived characteristics. As the association of the name with the outdated concept proved to be very strong, it is now considered a historical term only, and its current usage has been abandoned.
