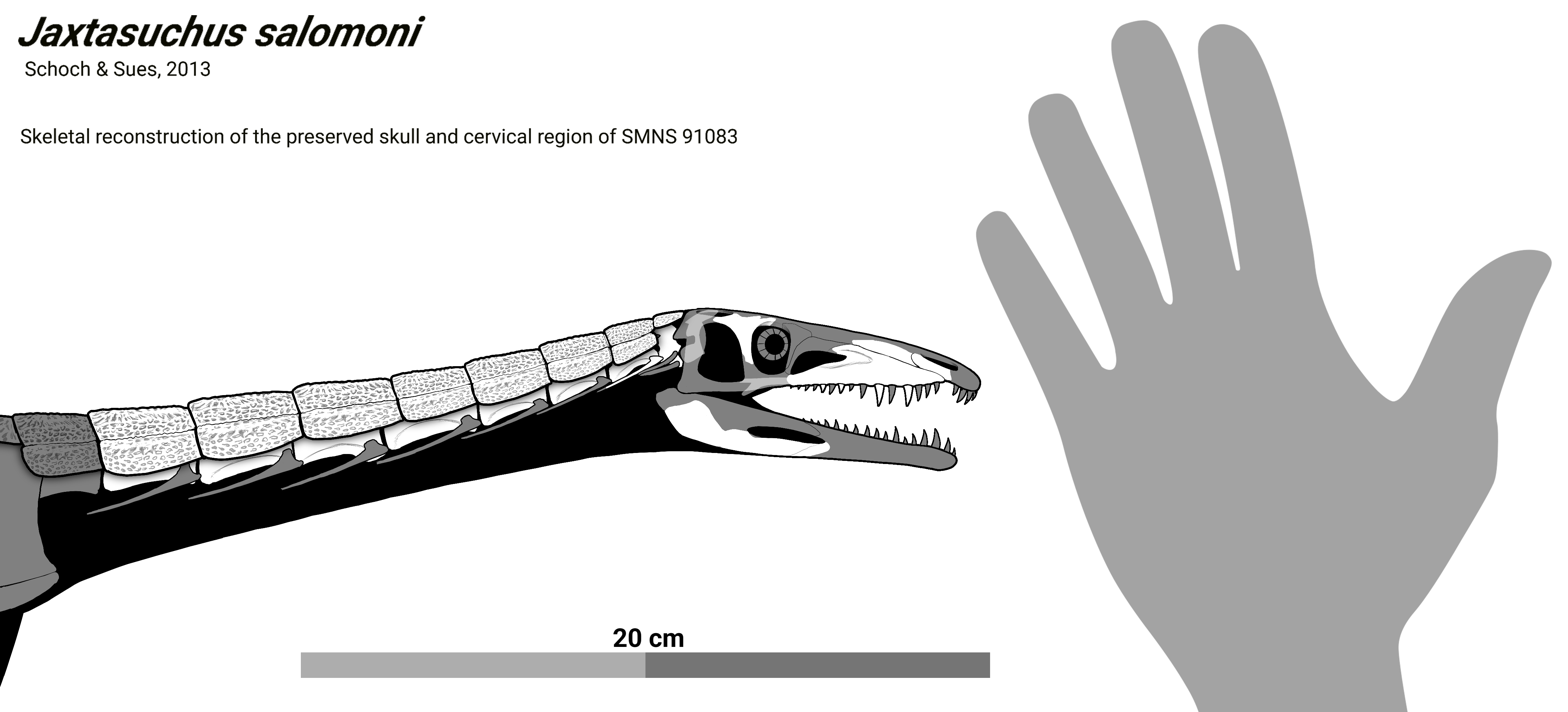

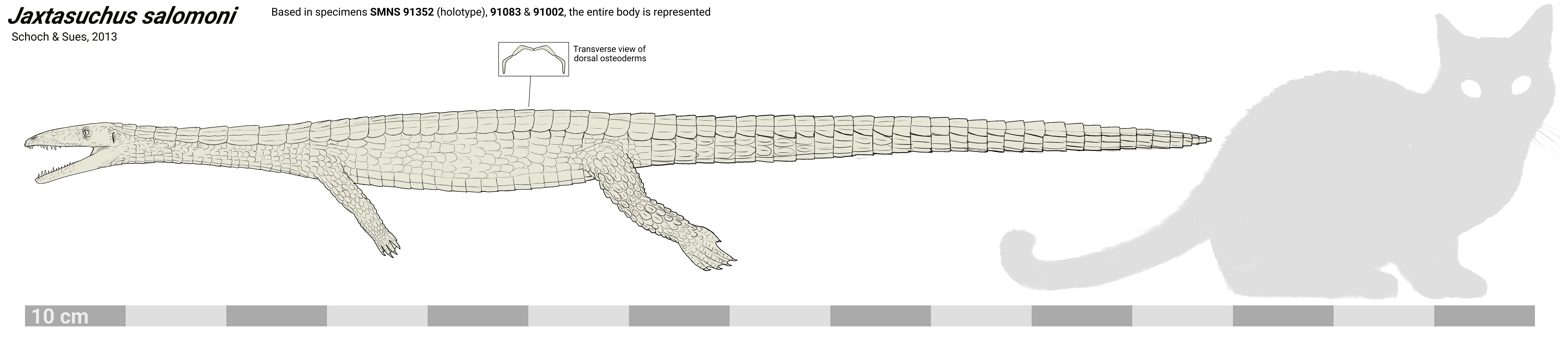
- Skeletal reconstruction of the head and neck (top) and full body size comparison (bottom)

Scientific classification
- Kingdom: Animalia
- Phylum: Chordata
- Class: Reptilia
- Clade: †Proterochampsia
- Family: †Doswelliidae
- Genus: †Jaxtasuchus; Schoch & Sues, 2013

Type species
- †Jaxtasuchus salomoni Schoch & Sues, 2013

= Jaxtasuchus =

Jaxtasuchus Temporal range: Ladinian ~242–237 Ma

Extinct genus of reptiles

Jaxtasuchus is an extinct genus of armored doswelliid archosauriform reptile known from the Middle Triassic (Ladinian stage) of the Erfurt Formation in Germany. The type species, Jaxtasuchus salomoni, was named in 2013 on the basis of several incomplete skeletons and other isolated remains. Like other doswelliids, members of the genus were heavily armored, with four longitudinal rows of bony plates called osteoderms covering the body. Jaxtasuchus is the first doswelliid known from Europe and is most closely related to Doswellia from the Late Triassic of the eastern United States. However, it was not as specialized as Doswellia, retaining several generalized archosauriform characteristics and having less armor. Jaxtasuchus fossils have been found in aquatic mudstones alongside fossils of temnospondyl amphibians, crustaceans, and mollusks, suggesting that Jaxtasuchus was semiaquatic like modern crocodilians.

== Discovery ==
Fossils of Jaxtasuchus have been found in the Lower Keuper of southern Germany, which dates back to the end of the Middle Triassic. The osteoderms of Jaxtasuchus were originally interpreted as the dermal bones of temnospondyl amphibians and later as the plates of aetosaur reptiles. The only other archosauriforms currently known from the Lower Keuper are Zanclodon laevis, which is known from a jaw fragment and several teeth, and Batrachotomus kupferzellensis, a large pseudosuchian archosaur that is known from several skeletons. Jaxtasuchus is the most abundant archosauriform reptile in the Lower Keuper. Its remains have been uncovered in six fossil localities: Limestone quarries at Rielingshausen, Zwingelhausen, and Vellberg (which has two quarries: Schumann and Ummenhofen), as well as roadcuts at Kupferzell and Wolpertshausen.

The holotype specimen, SMNS 91352, is a mostly complete skeleton missing the head and neck, which was found at the Schumann quarry of Eschenau (part of Vellberg). Another specimen from the same quarry, SMNS 91083, preserves an incomplete skull and neck. A third specimen from the quarry, SMNS 90500, preserves a forelimb, osteoderms, and a femur (thigh bone). Other more fragmentary specimens include vertebrae and osteoderms recovered from various other quarries and strata unearthed during highway construction. At some sites Jaxtasuchus is known only by its osteoderms.

Jaxtasuchus is named after Jagst, a tributary of the Neckar river in the region where fossils were found. The type species J. salomoni is named after Hans Michael Salomon, who discovered the holotype specimen and donated it to the Staatliches Museum für Naturkunde Stuttgart where it is now housed.

== Description ==
=== Skull ===
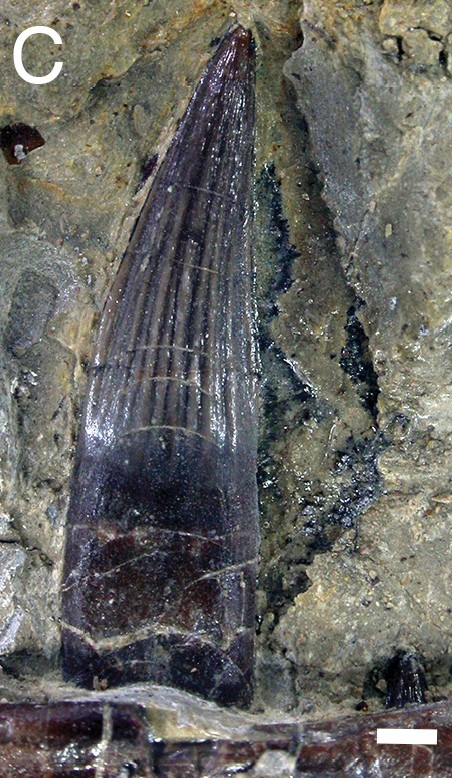
Tooth of Jaxtasuchus

The maxilla was long and low, with 15 tooth sockets. It was covered with irregular pits and had an incision at its rear edge, likely representing the antorbital fenestra. Fragments of premaxilla and nasal bones were also preserved, with a similar texturing to the maxilla. The teeth were sharp and slightly curved. They were oval shaped in cross-section, and uniquely lacked serrations while also having pronounced longitudinal ridges along their labial and lingual (cheek- and tongue-facing) sides. A three-pronged bone has been identified as the postorbital. Its structure is similar to that of most diapsid reptiles, indicating that Jaxtasuchus likely retained a lower temporal fenestra like other diapsids. This contrasts with Doswellia, which has a smaller and stouter postorbital bone and a lower temporal fenestra which has been completely closed up, giving it a euryapsid skull. Braincase bones have also been preserved in one specimen. The occipital condyle, which was formed by the basioccipital bone, projected from the rest of the skull (in contrast with Archeopelta), and the paired exoccipital bones which lied upon it did not contact each other (similar to other doswelliids). While Doswellia had a pronounced peg-like extension on the rear surface of the supraoccipital bone, Jaxtasuchus only had a vertical ridge. The only preserved bone of the lower jaw is the angular, which has a concave upper edge that may have formed the base of a mandibular fenestra (a hole in the jaw common to most archosauriforms but absent in Doswellia).

=== Postcranial skeleton ===
The cervical (neck) vertebrae of Jaxtasuchus were characteristically longer than they were high, increasing in size towards the base of the neck. The neural spines were low and rectangular, but were slightly taller at the base of the neck. The dorsal (torso) vertebrae, on the other hand, had wide neural spines with a roughly textured upper surface. This rough texturing signified where the vertebrae attached to the overlying osteoderms. The dorsal vertebrae were also longer than they were high, and some (but not all) had keels on their lower surface. Much like Doswellia, the ribs of Jaxtasuchus had an unusual shape, that being a long, slender rod bent at a 90-degree angle. Also like Doswellia, the "corner" of the bend has a rough ridge at the front. Nevertheless, the ribs of Jaxtasuchus did not extend outwards to the same extent as those of Doswellia. Caudal (tail) vertebrae were also elongated.

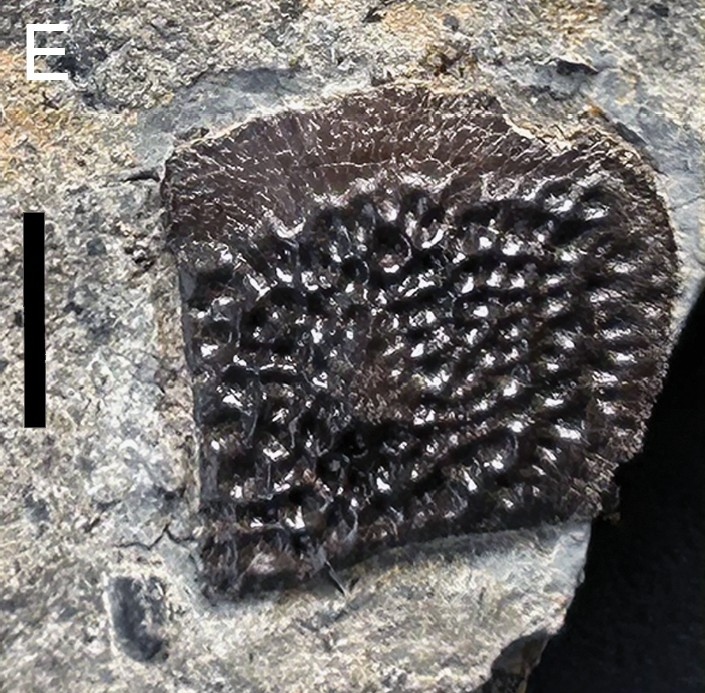
Lateral dorsal osteoderm of Jaxtasuchus

Jaxtasuchus was covered with armor plates known as osteoderms. The osteoderms lay on the body in four overlapping longitudinal rows per vertebrae: two middle of paramedian osteoderms (i.e. ones which were adjacent to the midline of the body) and a row on each side sutured lateral to these paramedian rows. Most of the osteoderms were roughly textured by a radiating web of ridges and pits, although they also had a flat, smooth front edge which was thinner than the rest of the plate. The middle of each osteoderm plate had a mound-like prominence covered with small pits. The paramedian osteoderms were generally wider than the lateral ones, and had a higher prominence, the lateral ones were narrower and usually had a rounder lateral margin, with those of the tail being triangular. The osteoderms at the level of the axis vertebra (second cervical) were trapezoidal, while those at the third cervical were broad. The rest of the cervicals had elongated and rectangular osteoderms, with the paramedians being twice as long as they were wide and the lateral osteoderms being three times as long, matching the length of their corresponding underlying vertebra. The dorsal osteoderms were flexed, rather than perfectly flat, and were slightly longer than wide. However, dorsal osteoderms directly in front of the hip were wider than they were long. At the base of the tail, the square-shaped paramedian osteoderms gradually lose their texture while the lateral osteoderms keep theirs. Further down the tail, the paramedian osteoderms become longer and finely pitted, while the lateral osteoderms shrink into triangular structures and then disappear. Small, keeled osteoderms were present on the limbs. Based on the flexed paramedian osteoderms, Jaxtasuchus likely had a more tall and narrow torso than Doswellia, which possessed six medial rows of osteoderms before flexure started to occur.

Despite the heavy armor of the torso, the limb bones of Jaxtasuchus were fairly small and slender, with the hindlimbs longer than the forelimbs. The bones of the forelimb were slender and unspecialized, similar to those of Euparkeria rather than the robust structures of Erythrosuchus. The metacarpals were long and slender, but the hand was not complete enough to come to specific conclusions on its structure. The hindlimbs were also typical of generalized early archosauriforms, and the femur (thigh bone) had an apparent fourth trochanter. The metatarsals were also similar to those of Euparkeria.

== Phylogeny ==
Cladogram after Schoch & Sues, 2013:

- Archosauromorpha
  - Mesosuchus
  - - Prolacerta
    - Archosauriformes
      - Proterosuchus
      - - Erythrosuchus
        - - Euparkeria
          - - Archosauria
              - Turfanosuchus
              - Avemetatarsalia
              - Pseudosuchia
            - - Chanaresuchus
              - Doswelliidae
                - Vancleavea
                - - Tarjadia
                  - - Archeopelta
                    - - Doswellia
                      - Jaxtasuchus

== Paleobiology ==
Fossils of Jaxtasuchus in Vellberg come from mudstones that were most likely deposited in brackish-water lakes or marshes. Because its fossils are common, they were probably not swept into aquatic environments from terrestrial areas. Jaxtasuchus was probably semiaquatic like modern crocodilians and resembled them in having heavy armor, short limbs, and a long tail. Sharp teeth suggest that Jaxtasuchus was most likely carnivorous. Aquatic temnospondyl amphibians such as Callistomordax, Kupferzellia, and Mastodonsaurus are common components of the fossil assemblage. Fossils of bivalves and ostracode crustaceans in these deposits provide evidence of fluctuating salinity levels over time, with most fossil vertebrates are found in layers corresponding to low salinity.
