= Acallosuchus =

Acallosuchus Temporal range: Late Triassic, 220 Ma

Scientific classification
- Domain: Eukaryota
- Kingdom: Animalia
- Phylum: Chordata
- Class: Reptilia
- Clade: Neodiapsida
- Clade: incertae sedis
- Genus: †Acallosuchus; Long and Murry, 1995

Species
- †A. rectori Long and Murry, 1995 (type)

Extinct genus of reptiles

Acallosuchus (meaning "ugly crocodile" in Greek) is an extinct genus of reptile from the Triassic Chinle Formation of the southwestern United States. Although it was discovered in 1923, Acallosuchus was not described until 1995, when the type species A. rectori was named. The taxonomy classification of Acallosuchus is uncertain. Although it is known to be a neodiapsid reptile, it has not been assigned with confidence to any particular group of neodiapsids.

== History ==
In 1923, paleontologist Charles Lewis Camp discovered a bone in the Chinle Formation in what is now Petrified Forest National Park. It was found on top of a Placerias jaw in an area called Crocodile Hill, part of the late Carnian-age Blue Mesa Member of the formation. The bone included the skull and lower jaws of a reptile, but when Camp removed it from the surrounding rock, then it broke apart. Camp described the skull as being 6 inches (15 cm) long, with a broken rostrum, and thought it belonged to a pterosaur or small dinosaur. Camp's description of this specimen was confined to his field notes and was not published.

In 1983, sixty years after it was first found, the specimen was rediscovered in a cigar box in a storage room of the University of California Museum of Paleontology. Bone fragments were crushed and did not resemble the sketches Camp made in his notes. The specimen was cataloged as UCMP 7038/27095 and formally described in 1995 as a new genus and species, Acallosuchus rectori. The term "Acallosuchus" means "ugly crocodile" from the Greek "akalles" ("ugly") and "suchus" ("crocodile"). The species was named after Roger Rector, a former superintendent of Petrified Forest National Park, and his wife.

A postcranial skeleton was also referred to Acallosuchus in 1989, although it was not found with the skull material. This skeleton was found in 1962 in an area very close to where Camp found UCMP 7038/27095. It was referred to Acallosuchus because it belonged to an animal of similar size to UCMP 7038/27095. The two specimens also had bony armor. In 1995, both specimens were redescribed. Because the postcranial skeleton was not associated with the original Acallosuchus material, it was placed in its own genus called Vancleavea.

== Description ==
Although it is poorly preserved, the skull of Acallosuchus has several features that distinguish it from other reptiles. The overall shape of the skull is long and narrow with large projections along its upper surface. These projections were first interpreted as osteoderms that fused to the cranial bones of the skull, but were later proposed to be knobs originating from the cranial bones themselves. Identifiable skull bones include a postorbito-jugal bar (a strut behind the eye socket) and a frontal with a small piece of the postorbital attached.

The mandible or lower jaw is even thinner than the skull and is lined by small, closely spaced alveoli or tooth sockets. Based on the shape and number of these sockets, Acallosuchus had at least 23 teeth in its lower jaw with the forward-most being the largest. The lower jaw is also covered in two rows of bony knobs that are similar to those on the skull.

== Classification ==
When it was first named in 1989, Acallosuchus was classified as a proterochampsid archosauriform. This was mainly based on the postcranial skeleton that is now assigned to Vancleavea, a definite archosauriform. When Vancleavea and Acallosuchus were distinguished from each other in 1995, both were redescribed as indeterminate diapsid reptiles. The presence of a postorbito-jugal bar indicates that Acallosuchus is a diapsid with the characteristic presence of two large holes in the back of the skull (the bar would have formed the anterior margins of these holes).

In 1995, similarities were noted between the bony ridges of Acallosuchus and the skulls of the archosauriforms Proterochampsa and Doswellia. A 2005 study also pointed out similarities with the archosaur Revueltosaurus. However, there are no features that definitively link Acallosuchus with any specific group of diapsids.
