= Thuringopelta =

Thuringopelta Temporal range: Late Triassic, Carnian

Scientific classification
- Domain: Eukaryota
- Kingdom: Animalia
- Phylum: Chordata
- Class: Reptilia
- Clade: Archosauromorpha
- Clade: Archosauriformes
- Clade: †Proterochampsia
- Family: †Doswelliidae
- Genus: †Thuringopelta
- Species: †T. werneburgi

Binomial name
- †Thuringopelta werneburgi Sues & Schoch, 2025

Extinct genus of reptiles

Thuringopelta is an extinct genus of doswelliid archosauromorphs known from the Upper Triassic (Carnian) Stuttgart Formation of Germany.
