= Evolution of the Vertebrates =

Textbook by Edwin Harris Colbert

Colbert's Evolution of the Vertebrates
- 5th Edition Book Cover
- Author: Edwin H. Colbert, Michael Morales, Eli C. Minkoff,
- Language: English, Japanese
- Subject: Vertebrate Evolution
- Publisher: Wiley-Liss
- Publication date: December 15, 2001
- Pages: 576
- ISBN: 0-471-38461-5
- OCLC: 46504406
- Dewey Decimal: 566 21
- LC Class: QE841 .C68 2001

Evolution of the Vertebrates, subtitled "A History of the Backboned Animals Through Time", is a basic paleontology textbook by Edwin H. Colbert, published by John Wiley & Sons.

== Overview ==
The first and second editions (1955 and 1969) provide an overview of the entire range of vertebrate evolution, and are illustrated by the distinctive drawings of Lois Darling. The style of writing is very light and readable, and technical concepts kept to a minimum. In the book vertebrate evolution is studied utilizing comparative anatomy & functional morphology of existing vertebrates, and fossil records. The book is considered a classic and has been used very frequently as a college-level or university introductory level text on the subjects of basic paleontology and vertebrate evolution.

These editions predate the cladistic revolution and so contain a number of chapters and sections dedicated to paraphyletic taxa (Labyrinthodonts, Thecodonts, Condylarths, etc.) which nevertheless constituted an important part of the understanding of the time.

== Latest publishing ==
The latest edition, the fifth edition, was cowritten with Michael Morales and Eli C. Minkoff, and has been revised to incorporate recent discoveries and current developments in the field of vertebrate evolution. This new addition includes entirely new sections. Some examples of these are conodonts, primates, and dinosaurs. Some new topics that the fifth edition discuss are:

- Analysis of morphological and molecular data
- Early ruling reptiles
- Basic adaptation of ungulates
- Early diversification of vertebrates
- The evolution of dinosaurs
- The origin of mammals

The fifth edition has generally received praise from both professors and students using this textbook on the college level. It has, however, received mild criticism for its out-of-date material. Others however argue that the broad scope of the edits in the fifth edition make up for any generalizations pertaining to specific details related to geological paleontology.

== Bibliography ==
- Edwin H. Colbert, (1969), Evolution of the Vertebrates, John Wiley & Sons (2nd ed.)
- Edwin H. Colbert, Michael Morales, Eli C. Minkoff, 2001 Colbert's Evolution of the Vertebrates: A History of the Backboned Animals Through Time, 5th Edition, Wiley, ISBN 0-471-38461-5
- Publisher's Website and Book Overview
