= Edwin H. Colbert =

American vertebrate paleontologist (1905–2001)

Edwin Harris Colbert
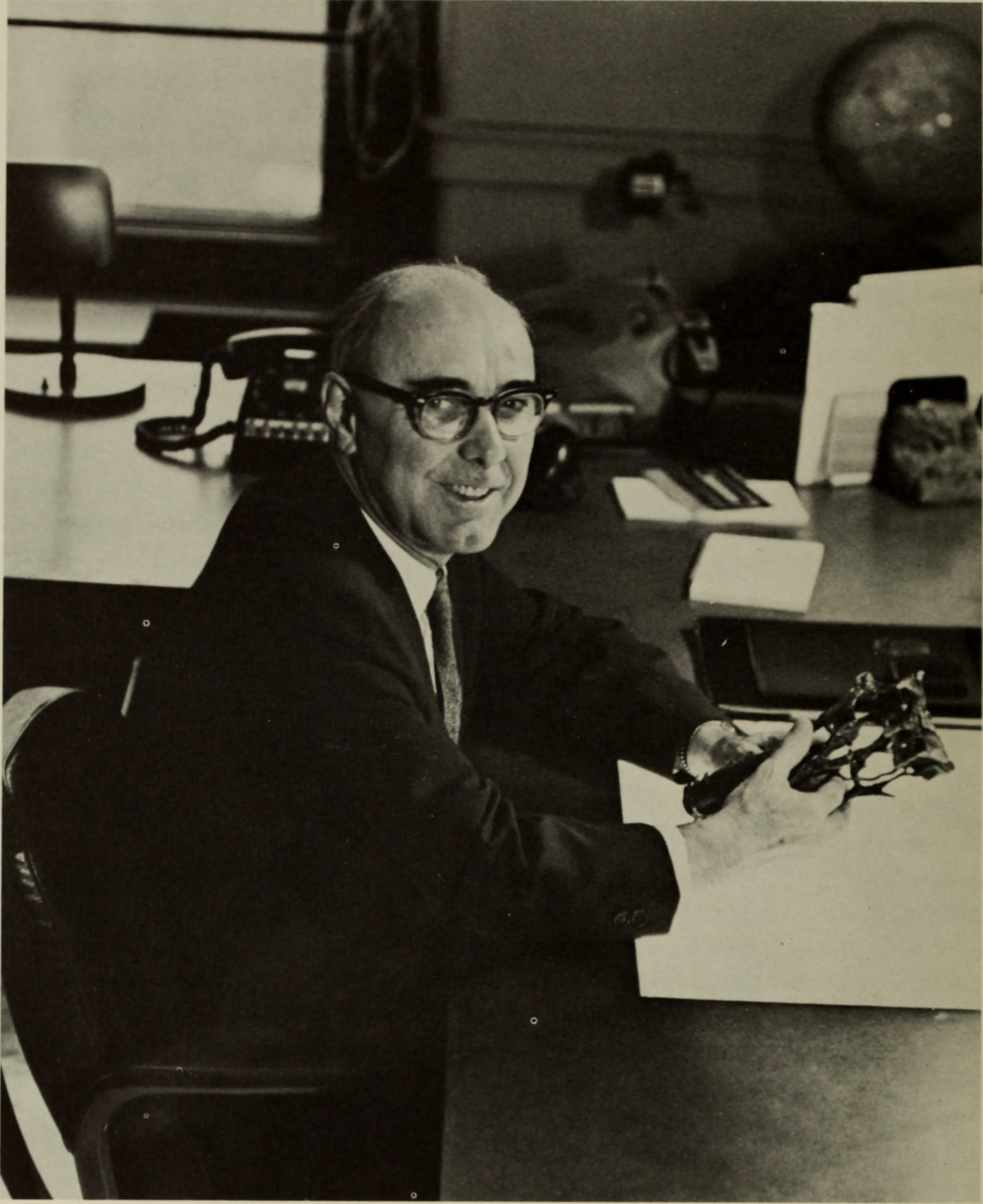
- Colbert in the 1960s
- Born: September 28, 1905; Clarinda, Iowa
- Died: 15 November 2001 (aged 96); Flagstaff, Arizona
- Education: University of Nebraska; Columbia University (Ph.D., 1935)
- Known for: Discovered complete skeletons of Coelophysis
- Awards: Daniel Giraud Elliot Medal (1935); Romer-Simpson Medal (1989); Hayden Memorial Geological Award (1997)
- Scientific career
- Fields: Paleontology; Evolutionary Biology
- Workplaces: American Museum of Natural History; Columbia University; Museum of Northern Arizona

Edwin Harris "Ned" Colbert (September 28, 1905 – November 15, 2001) was a distinguished American vertebrate paleontologist and prolific researcher and author.

Born in Clarinda, Iowa, he grew up in Maryville, Missouri and graduated from Maryville High School. He received his A.B. from the University of Nebraska, then his Masters and Ph.D. from Columbia University, finishing in 1935. He married Margaret Matthew, daughter of the eminent paleontologist William Diller Matthew, in 1933. She became a noted artist, illustrator, and sculptor who specialized in visualizing extinct species.

Among the positions Colbert held was Curator of Vertebrate Paleontology at the American Museum of Natural History for 40 years, and Professor Emeritus of Vertebrate Paleontology at Columbia University. He was a protégé of Henry Fairfield Osborn, and a foremost authority on the Dinosauria.

For his thesis, Siwalik Mammals in the American Museum of Natural History, Colbert was awarded the Daniel Giraud Elliot Medal from the National Academy of Sciences in 1935. He described dozens of new taxa and authored major systematic reviews, including the discovery of more than a dozen complete skeletons of a primitive small Triassic dinosaur, Coelophysis at Ghost Ranch, New Mexico, in 1947 (one of the largest concentrations of dinosaur deposits ever recorded), publication of their description, and a review of ceratopsian phylogeny.

His fieldwork in Antarctica in 1969 helped solidify the acceptance of continental drift with the discovery of a 220-million-year-old fossil of a Lystrosaurus. He was also the first person to name the Staurikosaurus. His popularity and his textbooks on dinosaurs, paleontology, and stratigraphy (with Marshall Kay) introduced a new generation of scientists and amateur enthusiasts to the subject. He was the recipient of numerous prizes and awards commemorating his many achievements in the field of science.

He retired from the AMNH in 1970 and became a curator of vertebrate paleontology at the Museum of Northern Arizona in Flagstaff, Arizona. He died at his home in Flagstaff in 2001.

== Early life ==
Colbert was born on September 28, 1905 in Clarinda, Iowa to Mary Adamson Colbert and George Harris Colbert, the youngest of their three sons. His father was a school superintendent in Page County, Iowa before being appointed as a mathematics professor at the newly established Northwest Missouri State University in 1906. Colbert grew up in Maryville, Missouri, where he worked as a paperboy and reporter for the town's Democrat-Forum newspaper. He also participated in the Boy Scouts, and became interested in fossils at an early age, collecting shells and corals from nearby creeks.

== Early education ==
Colbert attended Maryville High School and graduated in 1923. After graduating, he briefly attended Northwest Missouri State University, but was disinterested in the school's teacher-training program. In the summers, he worked for the United States Forest Service, building trails at Arapaho National Forest. While visiting his brother Phil, an engineer at the University of Nebraska, Colbert visited the University of Nebraska State Museum, which sparked his interest in paleontology and geology. After an interview with Erwin Barbour, the museum's director, Colbert transferred to the University of Nebraska in the fall of 1926, also taking on an assistantship at the museum.

== Paleontology and AMNH work ==
Colbert went on his first paleontological expedition with the University of Nebraska State Museum in 1928, where he collected Miocene fossil mammals in Nebraska.

In 1928, Colbert graduated from the University of Nebraska with his bachelor's degree. After being rejected from graduate programs at the University of California, Berkeley and Yale University, he moved to New York City in 1929 to begin studying at Columbia University. Through Columbia's paleontology program, Colbert worked at the American Museum of Natural History. He studied under William King Gregory, and worked as a research assistant for Henry Fairfield Osborn until Osborn's death in 1935. As Osborn's protégé, he studied the evolution of elephants, focusing on their teeth. Colbert expanded his research focus in his Ph.D. thesis to include antelopes, pigs, and giraffes that had been collected from the Sivalik Hills by Barnum Brown. He completed his Ph.D. in 1935, and received the Daniel Giraud Elliot Medal for his work.

In 1933, Colbert was appointed as an assistant curator at the AMNH, where he began a research program focused on the evolution of mammals, studying specimens from Burma and Mongolia. In 1938, he traveled to the Agate Fossil Beds in Nebraska with a team of paleontologists from the Academy of Natural Sciences. He began teaching at Columbia in the same year, and would go on to be appointed as a graduate professor. His students and mentees at Columbia included Stephen J. Gould, John Ostrom, and Dale Russell. Colbert returned to Nebraska again to collect from the White River Badlands in 1941 with an AMNH expedition.

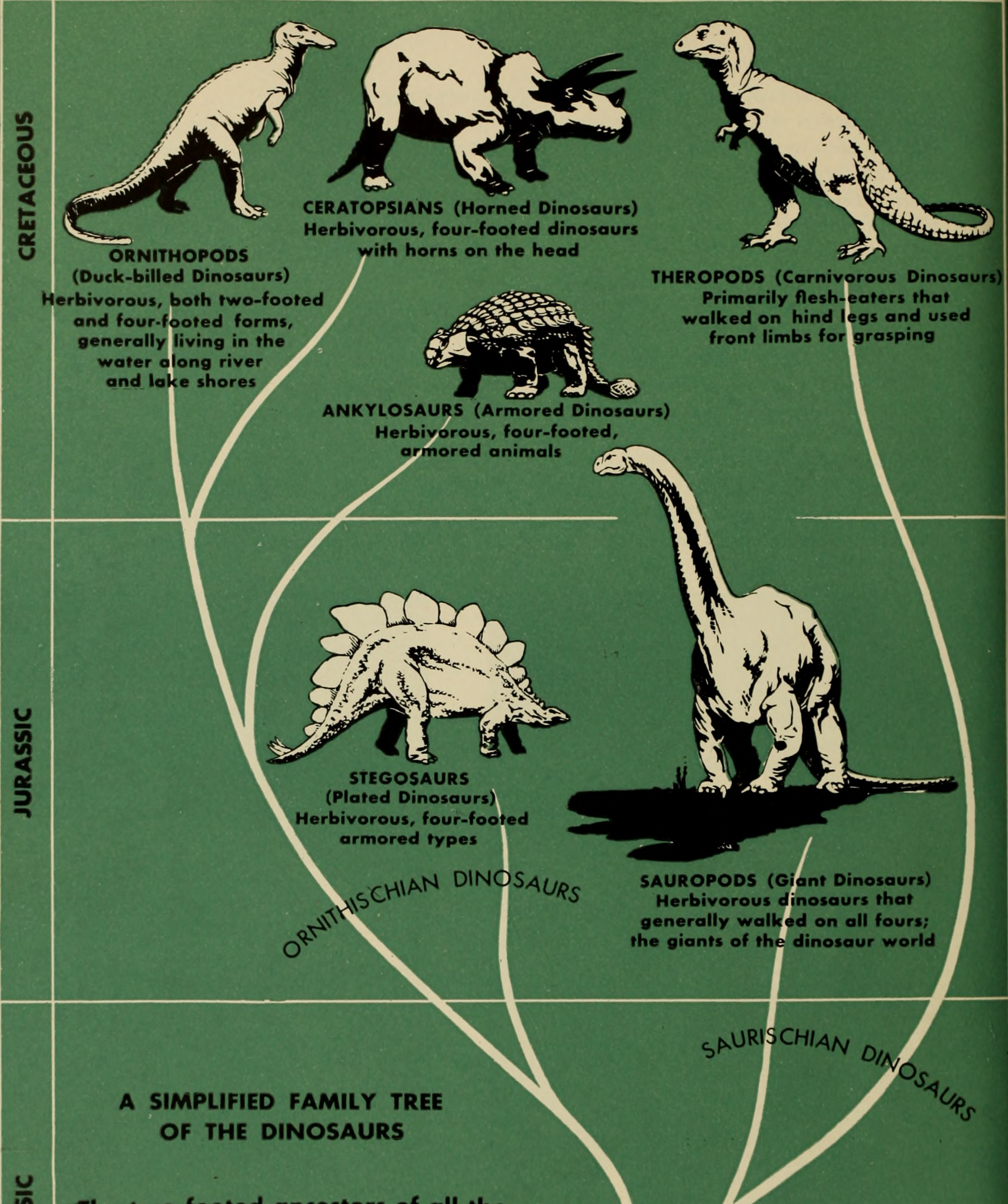
A dinosaur family tree from Colbert's The Dinosaur Book: The Ruling Reptiles and their Relatives (1945).

After World War II began, Colbert served as a civilian air raid warden in Leonia, New Jersey, and was appointed as a curator-in-charge of amphibians and reptiles, replacing the recently retired Barnum Brown. He began a working relationship with Alfred Sherwood Romer of Harvard University in order to familiarize himself with reptiles and amphibians. In 1945, he published his first book, intended for a lay audience, The Dinosaur Book: The Ruling Reptiles and Their Relatives.

In 1946, Colbert traveled to Arizona looking for Triassic fossils; he intended to return to the Petrified Forest National Park the following year but was side-tracked in New Mexico, where he encountered exposed rocks of the Chinle Formation at Ghost Ranch. Along with his assistant, George Whitaker, Colbert discovered one of the largest dinosaur deposits recorded after excavating over a dozen complete Coelophysis skeletons. He continued researching Coelophysis throughout his career, and published a monograph on its anatomy in 1989. From 1949 to 1952, Colbert served as the editor of Evolution, and later was the editor for Curator, a journal by the American Association of Museums. Throughout the 1940s and 1960s, he described several major fossil discoveries on the east coast, including Hypsognathus fenneri, Hadrosaurus minori, and Icarosaurus siefkeri, all found in New Jersey.

In 1957, Colbert was elected to the National Academy of Science, and as the president of the Society for the Study of Evolution. Colbert became chairman of the Vertebrate Paleontology department at the AMNH in 1958, succeeding George Gaylord Simpson in the role. Starting in 1959, Colbert began going on international expeditions, traveling to South Africa and the Paleorrota Geopark in Brazil with Llewellyn Ivor Price. His wife, Margaret, accompanied him, and together they collected Triassic fossils of dicynodonts. He also met Prasanta Chandra Mahalanobis, Jawaharlal Nehru, and Indira Gandhi on travels to Calcutta.

== Antarctica expedition and retirement ==
In 1968, Ralph Baillie, an Ohio State University student, came to Colbert with a fossil bone that he had discovered in the Transantarctic Mountains. Colbert assisted in identifying the amphibian bone, which was the first record of tetrapod life from Antarctica. Just before retiring from the AMNH, Colbert traveled to Antarctica on the urging of the National Science Foundation with an expedition team led by geologist David Elliot. While working in the Coalsack Bluffs, their team discovered fossils, which Colbert identified as Lystrosaurus bones. The discovery helped to prove the theory of continental drift, and was described as "one of the truly great fossil finds of all time" by Laurence M. Gould in the New York Times.

After returning from the expedition in 1970, Colbert retired from the American Museum of Natural History and moved to Flagstaff, Arizona, where he became the honorary curator of vertebrate paleontology at the Museum of Northern Arizona. He continued to conduct research and author papers until his death on November 15, 2001.

== Personal life ==
In 1930, Colbert met Margaret Matthew, the daughter of paleontologist Willam Diller Matthew, who had recently graduated from the California School of Arts and Crafts and taken a position as a staff artist at the AMNH. After she was assigned to illustrate Colbert's work on the Sivalik fossils, they began a romance and were married in 1933. The couple had five sons together and settled in Leonia, New Jersey in 1947.

While working at Ghost Ranch, New Mexico in the 1940s, Colbert met and befriended artist Georgia O'Keeffe, who lived less than a mile from the excavation site and frequently painted the Chinle Formation. In 2006, Sterling Nesbitt and Mark Norell would name the species Effigia okeeffeae, whose fossil Colbert excavated, after O'Keeffe.

== Awards ==
In addition to the 1935 Daniel Giraud Elliot Medal, Colbert also received the Gold Medal for Scientific Achievement from the AMNH in 1970, the Romer-Simpson Medal from the Society of Vertebrate Paleontology in 1989, and the Hayden Memorial Geological Award in 1996.

== Works ==
Colbert wrote more than 20 books and over 400 scientific articles.

- 1935: Siwalik Mammals in the American Museum of Natural History
- 1945: The Dinosaur Book: The Ruling Reptiles and Their Relatives (repub 1951)
- 1955: Colbert's Evolution of the Vertebrates: A History of the Backboned Animals Through Time (four more editions in 1969, 1980, 1991 & 2001; fifth edition with Eli C. Minkoff & Michael Morales)
- 1961: The World of Dinosaurs, illustrated by George Geygan (repub in 1977 as Dinosaur World)
- 1961: Dinosaurs: Their Discovery and Their World
- 1965: The Age of Reptiles, illustrated by Margaret Colbert (repub 1987)
- 1968: Men and Dinosaurs: The Search in Field and Laboratory (repub 1971)
- 1968: Millions of Years Ago: Prehistoric Life in North America, illustrated by Margaret Colbert
- 1973: Wandering Lands and Animals: The Story of Continental Drift and Animal Populations (repub 1985)
- 1977: The Year of the Dinosaur, illustrated by Margaret Colbert
- 1983: Dinosaurs: An Illustrated History. ISBN 978-0-8437-3332-7
- 1984: The Great Dinosaur Hunters and Their Discoveries. ISBN 978-0-486-24701-4
- 1989: Digging into the Past: An Autobiography. ISBN 978-0-942637-08-3
- 1995: The Little Dinosaurs of Ghost Ranch. ISBN 978-0-231-08236-5
- 1980: Fossil-Hunter's Notebook: My Life with Dinosaurs and Other Friends, w/Elias Colbert. ISBN 978-0-525-10772-9
