= Litorosuchus =

Litorosuchus Temporal range: 241–235 Ma Ladinian (Middle Triassic)

Scientific classification
- Domain: Eukaryota
- Kingdom: Animalia
- Phylum: Chordata
- Class: Reptilia
- Clade: Archosauromorpha
- Clade: Archosauriformes
- Genus: †Litorosuchus; Li et al., 2016
- Species: †L. somnii

Binomial name
- †Litorosuchus somnii Li et al., 2016

Extinct genus of reptiles

Litorosuchus is a genus of armored, semiaquatic archosauriform reptile from the Middle Triassic of China, closely related to the morphologically similar Vancleavea. It contains one species, L. somnii.

== Description ==
For an archosauriform, Litorosuchus was medium-sized at some 2 metres (6 ft 7 in) in length. It shows clear adaptations to a semiaquatic lifestyle: the nasal opening is retracted and angled upwards, the tail is tall and long (about 60% of the animal's entire length), the scapula is short and broad, the feet are webbed (as shown by fossilized skin impressions), the neck is long and slender, and the snout is long, with many of the teeth being conical. In many of these ways, Litorosuchus resembles the similarly semiaquatic Vancleavea from North America.

Like Vancleavea, the body of Litorosuchus was covered in bony plates known as osteoderms, of which eight distinct types can be observed: two rows of rectangular-to-roundish semi-concave osteoderms with central ridges covered the neck and back; more oval-shaped osteoderms, also with ridges, covered the sides of the trunk and the rest of the neck; a row of tall, spike-like osteoderms lined the top of the tail (similar to Vancleavea); small, thin, and variably-shaped osteoderms covered the arm above the hand and the foot above the ankle; sheets of tiny osteoderms covered the hands and feet; rows of broad, oval-shaped osteoderms covered the bottom of the trunk; similarly broad but semi-concave osteoderms covered the bottom portion of the tail; and oval, keeled osteoderms with a notch on the back edge covered the remainder of the tail. Out of these eight types, the former four are found in other archosauriforms, but the latter four are entirely unique to Litorosuchus.

Asides from the aforementioned characteristics, Litorosuchus can also be differentiated from other archosauriforms by a unique combination of other characters: only two teeth are present on the premaxilla, and are situated close to the front of the bone; the maxillary process, on the back edge of the premaxilla, is relatively long; the nasal process of the maxilla extends behind the back edge of the nostril; there is a large, canine-like (caniniform) tooth on each maxilla (also seen in Vancleavea); the prefrontal bone is T-shaped and extends down to the lacrimal bone, separating the latter from the eye socket; the width of the skull roof between the antorbital fenestrae is very thin, being only one-fifth the width of the skull roof between the eye sockets; a vertical ridge is present on the sides of most of the caudal vertebrae; and the joint between the astragalus and the calcaneum is a simple butt joint (the bones meet in flat surfaces, not ball-and-socket joints).

== Discovery and naming ==
Litorosuchus is known from one nearly-complete skeleton embedded in a slab of limestone and lying on its left side. The rocks in which the specimen was found are located in Fuyuan County, Yunnan, and belong to the Zhuganpo Member of the Ladinian-age Falang Formation. The specimen is stored in the Institute of Vertebrate Paleontology and Paleoanthropology under the number IVPP V 16978.

The genus name is derived from Latin litoralis ("littoral"), in reference to the habitat of this animal, and Greek soukhos ("crocodile"). The species name, somnii, comes from the Latin somnium ("dream"); this is because the lead author dreamt of the animal while trying to come up with a name for it.

== Classification ==
In 2016, Litorosuchus was found to be closely related to Vancleavea in a phylogenetic analysis, with both being non-archosaur archosauriforms. The results of said analysis are reproduced partially below.

- - Mesosuchus
  - Prolacerta
  - Archosauriformes
    - Proterosuchus
    - - Erythrosuchus
      - - - Vancleavea
          - Litorosuchus
        - - Doswellia
          - - Proterochampsia
              - Chanaresuchus
              - Tropidosuchus
            - - Euparkeria
              - - Phytosauria
                  - Parasuchus
                  - - Smilosuchus
                    - Pseudopalatus
                - Archosauria

== Paleoecology ==
The Zhuganpo Member of the Falang Formation, from which Litorosuchus is known, would have been a coastal, shallow-water environment. In addition to various actinopterygian fish, various reptiles are known from this location; they include the terrestrial Macrocnemus as well as the aquatic Lariosaurus, Keichousaurus, Yunguisaurus, Qianxisaurus, Tanystropheus, Anshunsaurus, and Glyphoderma.

Besides Litorosuchus and Vancleavea, other possibly semiaquatic archosauriforms include Qianosuchus and Diandongosuchus; both show some of the morphological specializations associated with semiaquatic lifestyles, and the latter was found with fish bones in its stomach. In addition, phytosaurs and proterochampsids also have retracted nostrils. The large number of independent acquisitions of semiaquatic lifestyles among archosauriforms may be indicative of plasticity in the lifestyles of these animals, which could also explain the prevalence of semiaquatic crocodiles and birds in the modern world.
