= Vertebrate Paleontology (book) =

Textbook on vertebrate paleontology

- 1947 edition
- Author: Alfred Sherwood Romer
- Language: English language
- Subject: Vertebrate paleontology
- Published: 1933, 1945, 1966
- Publisher: University of Chicago Press
- Publication place: United States
- Media type: Textbook
- ISBN: 0-7167-1822-7 (3rd edition)

Vertebrate Paleontology is an advanced textbook on vertebrate paleontology by Alfred Sherwood Romer, published by the University of Chicago Press. It went through three editions (1933, 1945, 1966) and for many years constituted a very authoritative work and the definitive coverage of the subject. A condensed version centering on comparative anatomy, coauthored by T. S. Parson came in 1977, remaining in print until 1985. The 1988 book Vertebrate Paleontology and Evolution by Robert L. Carroll is largely based on Romer's book.

The book provides a very detailed and comprehensive technical account of every main group of living and fossil vertebrates, though the mammal-like reptiles are covered in particular, these being Romer's main interest. At the rear of the book is a classification list which includes every genus known at the time of publication, along with locality and stratigraphic range.
