= Ankylosuchus =

Ankylosuchus Temporal range: Late Triassic, Carnian

Scientific classification
- Kingdom: Animalia
- Phylum: Chordata
- Class: Reptilia
- Clade: †Proterochampsia
- Family: †Doswelliidae
- Genus: †Ankylosuchus; Lucas et al., 2013

Type species
- †Ankylosuchus chinlegroupensis Lucas et al., 2013

Extinct genus of reptiles

Ankylosuchus is an extinct doswelliid archosauromorph reptile that lived during the Late Triassic of Texas. Ankylosuchus is a monotypic genus and the type species is Ankylosuchus chinlegroupensis. It was relatively small animal only being around a meter in length not including the tail.

Ankylosuchus is similar to other doswelliids in having heavy armor consisting of thick bony plates called osteoderms that interlock tightly and are irregularly pitted. It differs from other doswelliids in that the pits on the osteoderms are deeper and some osteoderms are fused to those that lie laterally to them.

== Discovery ==
It was named in 2013 on the basis of a fossil specimen including fragments of four vertebrae, parts of the skull, and part of a limb bone. These remains come from the Colorado City Formation, which dates to the early Carnian age of the Late Triassic. A. chinlegroupensis is named after the Chinle Group, a stratigraphic group that many Late Triassic formations of the southwestern United States have often been placed under, although a recent revision in stratigraphic nomenclature favors it being called the Dockum Group, which would make the species name a misnomer.
