= Vertebrate Paleontology and Evolution =

Textbook by Robert L. Carroll

- First edition
- Author: Robert L. Carroll
- Language: English
- Subject: Vertebrate paleontology
- Genre: Non-fiction
- Publisher: WH Freeman
- Publication date: 1988
- Publication place: United States
- ISBN: 0-7167-1822-7

Vertebrate Paleontology and Evolution is an advanced textbook on vertebrate paleontology by Robert L. Carroll, published in 1988 by WH Freeman. It provides a very detailed technical account of various groups of living and fossil vertebrates.

The book, which is written in the style of Alfred Sherwood Romer's Vertebrate Paleontology, presented more recent overall coverage of the subject. At the rear of the book is a 53-page Classification list which lists every genus known at the time of publication, along with locality and stratigraphic range.

Vertebrate Paleontology and Evolution appeared in print in 1988, just before the cladistic taxonomy became popular in vertebrate paleontology. The books thus uses the classical systematic scheme, including a number of paraphyletic taxa that are not recognised under phylogenetic nomenclature.

== Bibliography ==
- Carroll, R.L. (1988). Vertebrate Paleontology and Evolution. WH Freeman and Company, New York. ISBN 0-7167-1822-7.
