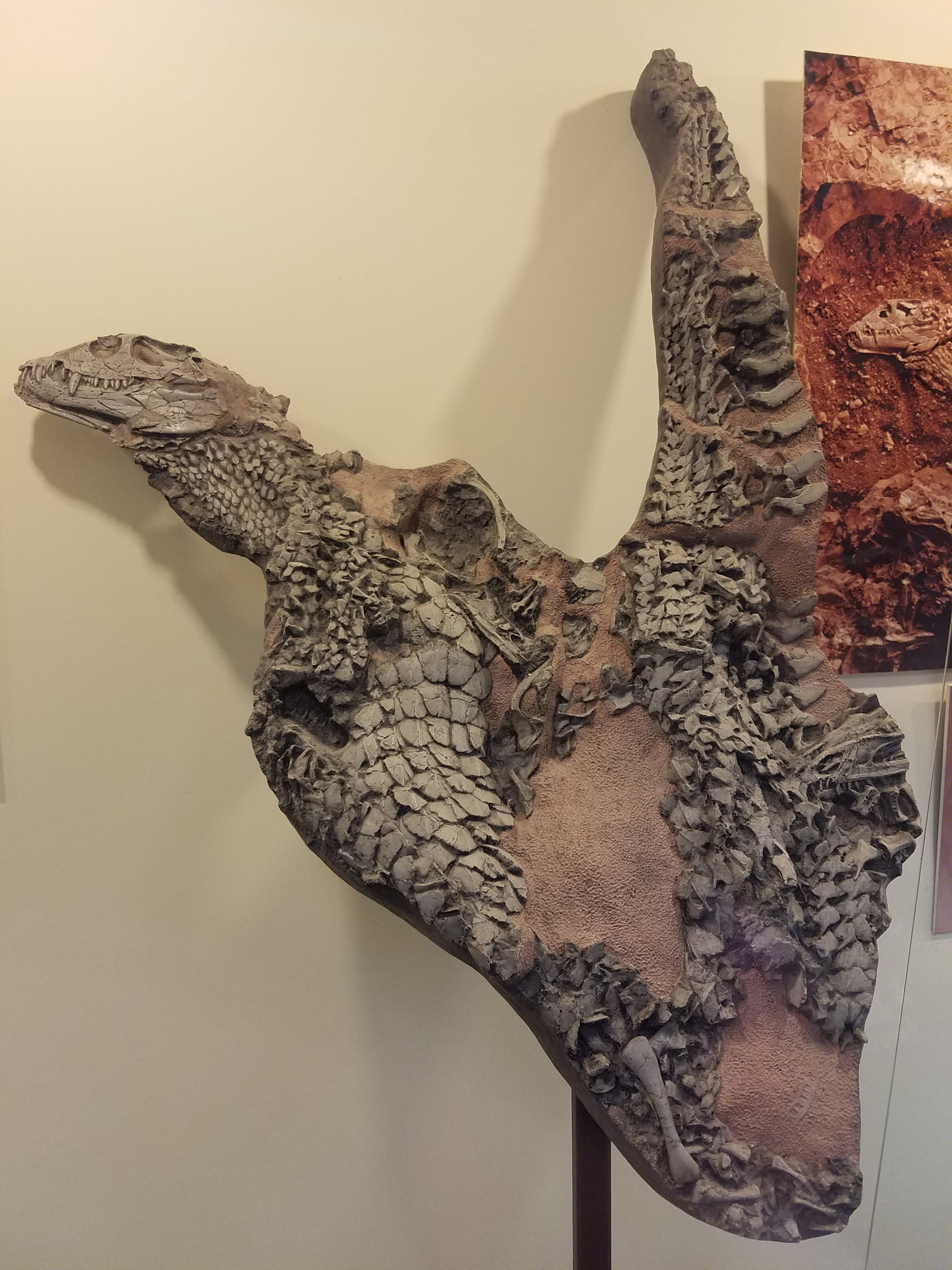
- A cast of specimen GR 138

Scientific classification
- Kingdom: Animalia
- Phylum: Chordata
- Class: Reptilia
- Clade: †Proterochampsia
- Family: †Doswelliidae
- Genus: †Vancleavea; Long & Murry, 1995

Type species
- †Vancleavea campi Long & Murry, 1995

= Vancleavea =

Vancleavea Temporal range: 228–201.3 Ma Late Triassic

Extinct genus of reptiles

Vancleavea is a genus of extinct, armoured, non-archosaurian archosauriforms from the Late Triassic of western North America. The type and only known species is V. campi, named by Robert Long & Phillip A Murry in 1995. At that time, the genus was only known from fragmentary bones including osteoderms and vertebrae. However, since then many more fossils have been found, including a pair of nearly complete skeletons discovered in 2002. These finds have shown that members of the genus were bizarre semiaquatic reptiles. Vancleavea individuals had short snouts with large, fang-like teeth, and long bodies with small limbs. They were completely covered with bony plates known as osteoderms, which came in several different varieties distributed around the body. Phylogenetic analyses by professional paleontologists have shown that Vancleavea was an archosauriform, part of the lineage of reptiles that would lead to archosaurs such as dinosaurs and crocodilians. Vancleavea lacks certain traits which are present in most other archosauriforms, most notably the antorbital, mandibular and supratemporal fenestrae, which are weight-saving holes in the skulls of other taxa. However, other features clearly support its archosauriform identity, including a lack of intercentra, the presence of osteoderms, an ossified laterosphenoid, and several adaptations of the femur and ankle bones. In 2016, a new genus of archosauriform, Litorosuchus, was described. This genus resembled both Vancleavea and more typical archosauriforms in different respects, allowing Litorosuchus to act as a transitional fossil linking Vancleavea to less aberrant archosauriforms.

== History ==
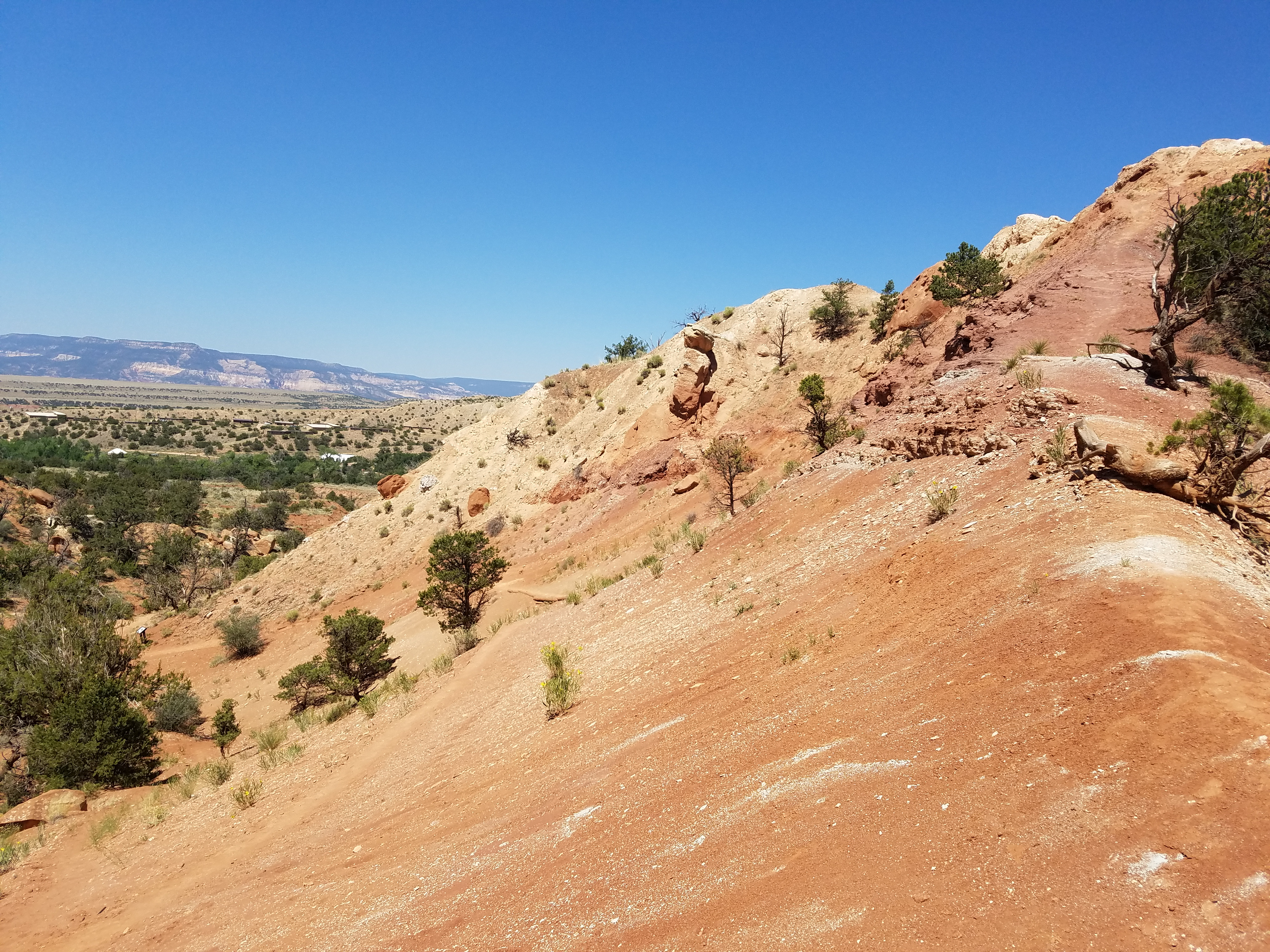
Vancleavea fossils have been found throughout New Mexico and Arizona, but the most complete specimens hail from the Coelophysis Quarry at Ghost Ranch.

Vancleavea was first discovered in 1962 from the Petrified Forest Member of the Petrified Forest National Park and initially described by Long and Murry in 1995. At that time the only described specimen was the holotype, PEFO 2427. The genus is named after Phillip Van Cleave, who discovered the first known remains of the genus. Since then, a number of remains have been found. A 2009 reevaluation of the genus by Nesbitt et al. formally described two additional specimens, GR 138 and 139. GR 138 is particularly notable due to being a nearly complete and articulated skeleton preserving a variety of osteoderms in the positions they would have been in during life. It was discovered at the Coelophysis Quarry in north-central New Mexico (Ghost Ranch), US, and was prepared at the Ruth Hall Museum of Paleontology in Abiquiú, New Mexico before its formal description. Vancleavea is a fairly common occurrence in most levels of the Chinle Formation, however, due to the poorly preserved remains, it is difficult to compare specimens across stratigraphic levels.

== Description ==
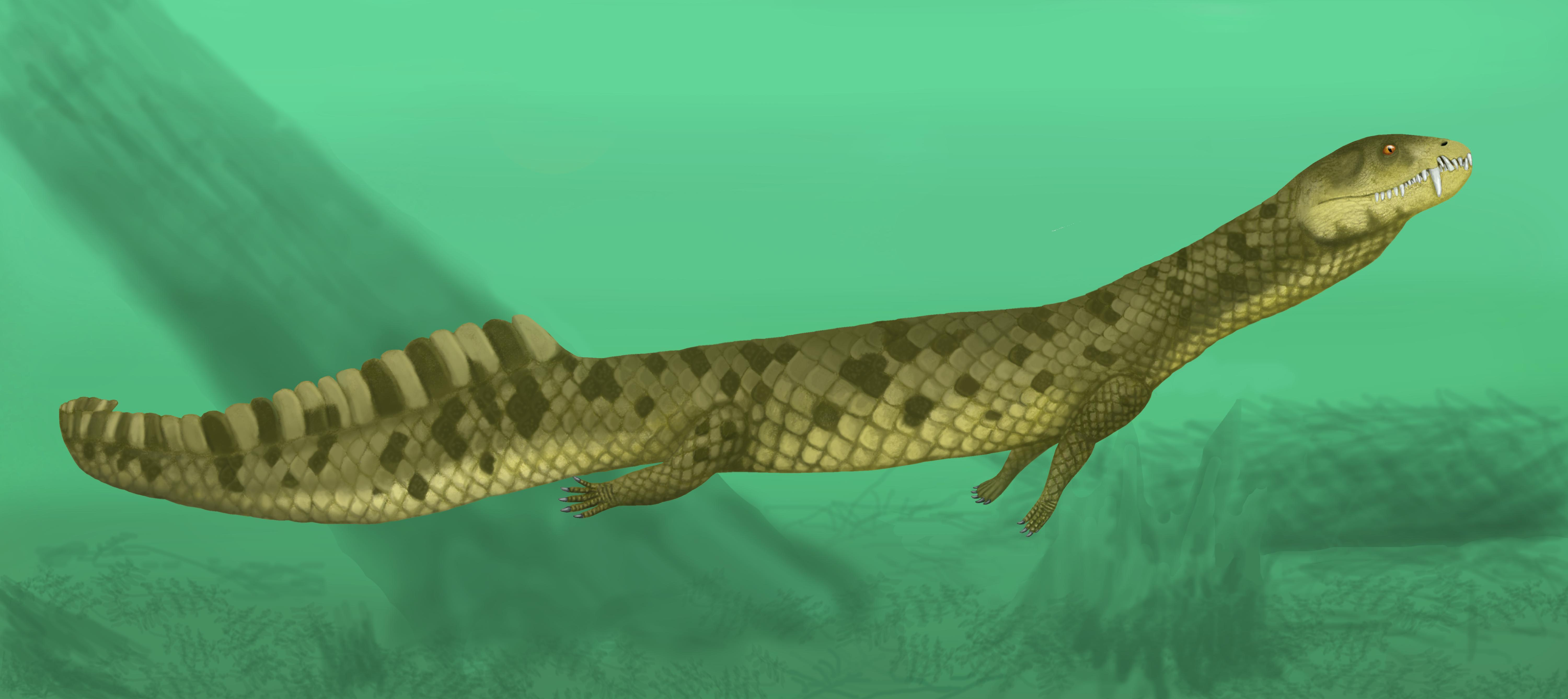
Life restoration.

The most complete specimen of Vancleavea (GR 138) was around 1.2 m (3.9 ft) in length. However, isolated bones have shown that members of the genus could grow larger than GR 138. In particular, MCCDM 1745 from New Mexico may have reached a total length of 3.86 m (12.7 ft). Imbricating osteoderms cover the entire body, the limbs are relatively short, and the skull is highly ossified. The supratemporal fenestra is absent, which may represent a secondary closure rather than a plesiomorphic trait. The nares open dorsally (i.e. nostrils face upward) and the jaw contains enlarged caniniform fangs. Each osteoderm possesses a pronounced central keel and an anterior projection. The ilium of Vancleavea resembles those of unrelated drepanosaurs. The unique morphology of Vancleavea differs greatly from any other known basal archosauriform.

=== Skull ===
The only known Vancleavea specimen preserving a complete skull is GR 138, and as a result that specimen is the basis for knowledge of the skull in this taxon. The postorbital region of the skull (behind the eyes) is long and boxy, with a wide and flat skull roof. The preorbital region (in front of the eyes), on the other hand, is short, triangular, and thin. A distinguishing feature of Vancleavea is the lack of an antorbital fenestra, a hole in front of the eyes which is typical for archosauriforms. The lacrimal bone, which usually forms the rear edge of the antorbital fenestra, has also disappeared. Grooves cover the skull roof while foramina (tiny pores) coat the skull bones near the mouth.

==== Preorbital region (snout) ====
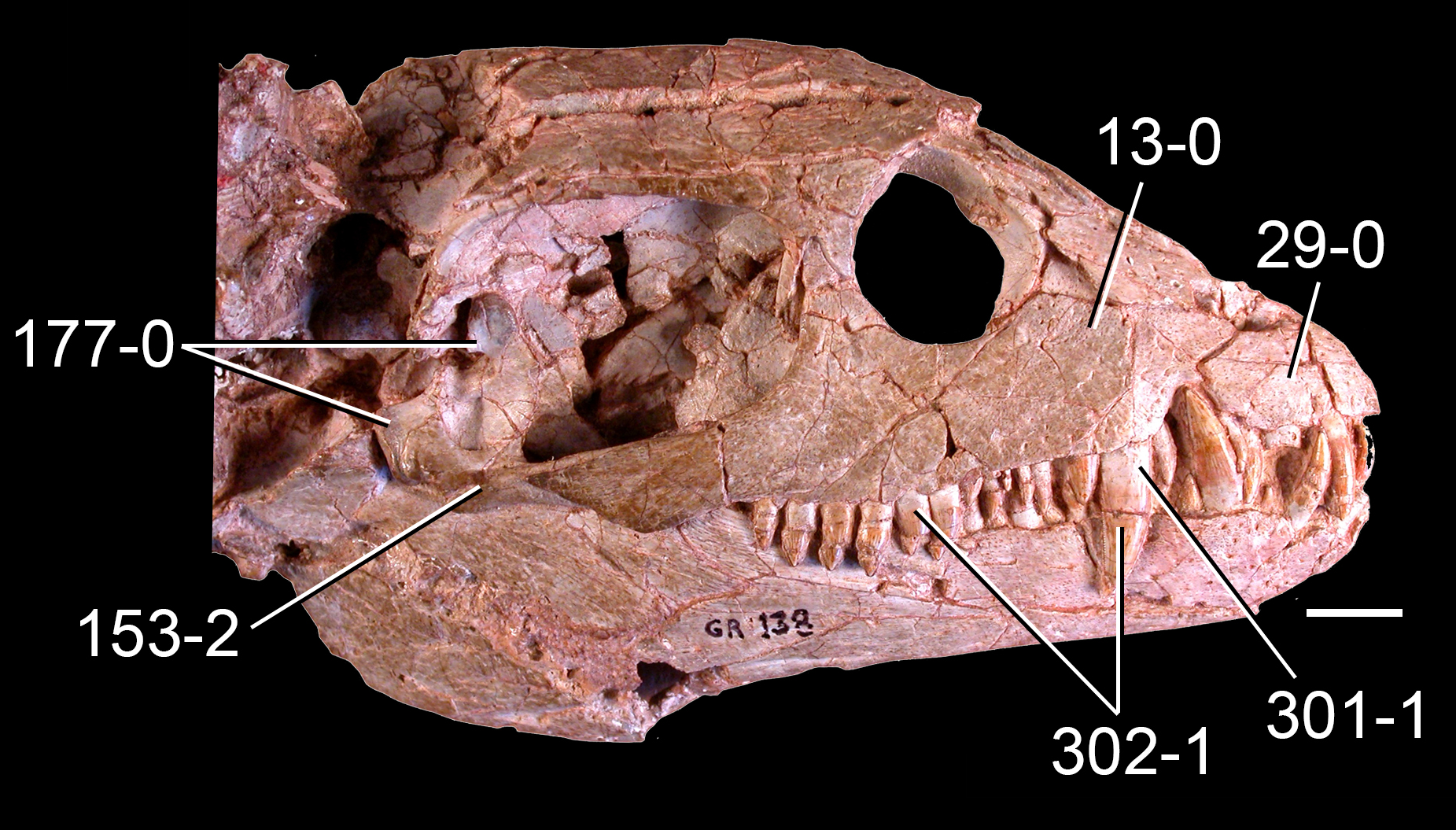
A cast of the skull of GR 138

The maxilla (the main tooth-bearing bone of the snout) is simple and triangular due to the loss of the antorbital fenestra. The front tip of the bone possesses a toothless notch, known as a diastema, which accepts a large, caniniform (fang-like) tooth of the dentary (main toothed bone of the lower jaw). The second tooth of the maxilla is also a caniniform tooth, approximately as long as that of the dentary. These fangs are flattened from the side, curved backwards, and serrated on their rear edge (and in the case of the maxillary fang, the front edge as well). This contrasts with the rest of the teeth, which are generally cone-shaped. The single tooth in front of the maxillary fang, as well four immediately behind it are very small. These small teeth are followed by six somewhat larger maxillary teeth and a final small tooth.

Five teeth are also present in each premaxilla (a pair of bones at the tip of the snout), with the third tooth being a caniniform tooth similar to that of the maxilla and dentary. The premaxilla also has a pair of bony projections (processes) which connect to other snout bones. The posterodorsal process snakes up the front of the maxilla, separating that bone from the nares (nostril holes). The thin anterodorsal process instead runs along the midline of the snout. The paired nasal bones on the upper edge of the snout are long and rectangular, and at their front edge are the rounded, upwards-pointing nares. The nasals do not contact each other; at the front and middle of the snout the anterodorsal processes of the premaxillae separate each nasal. At the level of the eyes, the nasals are divided by another feature unique to Vancleavea: a single narrow bone likely acquired by a neomorphic mutation. The front edge of the orbit is formed by the narrow prefrontal bone.

==== Postorbital region ====
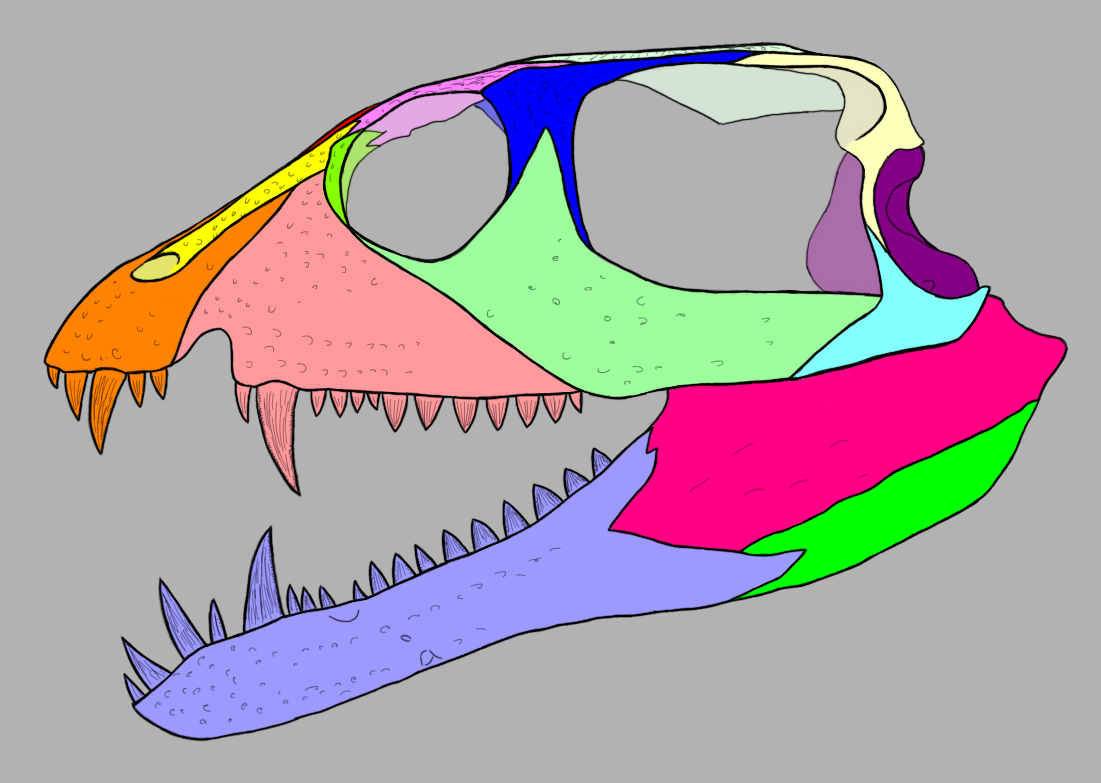
A color-coded diagram of the skull

The jugal (cheek bone) is complex. It has a tapering front edge that extends under the eye to contact the prefrontal, thereby excluding the maxilla from the orbit. A triangular upward projection rises up behind the eye and splits the lower part of the postorbital bone (which forms the rear edge of the eye) in half. Both the jugal and postorbital have very long rear extensions which nearly reach the back of the skull. A vast open space (about a third the length of the skull) lies in the area between these two extensions. This hole is known as a lateral temporal fenestra. Reptiles of the group Diapsida are typically characterized by having two temporal fenestrae at the back of the skull: a lower one on the side of the skull (the lateral temporal fenestra) as well as a larger one on the top of the skull (the supratemporal fenestra). Vancleavea breaks away from this standard, as its supratemporal fenestra has completely closed up during evolution, leaving only the huge lateral temporal fenestra.

The flat and heavily sculptured skull roof is formed by the paired frontal bones above the eyes and the parietal bones above the temporal fenestra. The connection between the frontal pair and the parietal pair is W-shaped, with each parietal having a triangular forward point which penetrates each frontal. A similar connection is also present at the front edge of the frontals, where each frontal is bisected by the rear tip of each nasal bone. Similar to proterochampsians and a few types of archosaurs (crocodylomorphs, dinosaurs, and shuvosaurids), Vancleavea does not possess a postfrontal, a small wedge-like bone which sometimes occupies the rear upper corner of the orbit.

The rear edge of the skull is somewhat difficult to interpret even in well-preserved specimens such as GR 138. The upper rear corner of the temporal fenestra is formed by the squamosal bone, which connects to the back of the postorbital bone and the parietal bone, as well as the braincase. The front edge of the squamosal possesses a deep 'pocket', while the lower portion of the bone expands into a large downward-pointing 'hood'. A thin structure known as a ventral process stretches downwards, forming the rear edge of the temporal fenestra. This ventral process connects to the quadratojugal bone, which itself contacts the rear branch of the jugal and forms the rear lower corner of the temporal fenestra. The quadrate bone, which forms the cranium's contribution to the jaw joint, is located inwards from the squamosal's ventral process. The quadrate not only contacts the lower jaw, but also connects to the inner face of the quadratojugal and is overlapped by the 'hood' of the squamosal. The appearance of the quadrate is yet another unique aspect of Vancleavea. In most basal archosauriforms, the quadrate is tall and straight, but in Vancleavea it is short, stout, and arched forwards.

==== Braincase ====
As is typical for reptiles, the lower rear portion of the braincase is formed by a bone known as the basioccipital, although this bone is unusually long and low in Vancleavea. The rear portion of the bone has a single large knob, known as an occipital condyle, which attaches the skull to the neck. A pair of bones outwards-angled known as exoccipitals attach to the upper surface of the basioccipital. In most archosauriforms, the exoccipitals form the upper surface of the occipital condyle, but Vancleavea is unique in lacking this contact. The bases of the exoccipitals are elongated and diverge towards the rear of the basioccipital. They also converge towards the front, although they do not contact each other. In addition, a small ridge runs between the bases on the upper surface of the basioccipital. Thus, when seen from above, the bases of the exoccipitals resemble a forward-pointing arrow with a small gap at the apex. A ridge and a small pit are present on each side of the basioccipital under the contact with the exoccipital. An additional pit believed to be the opening for the hypoglossal canal lies on the outer side of each exoccipital.

A pair of rounded plates known as basitubera jut downwards and slightly outwards from the rear surface of the basioccipital. In front of the basitubera lies the parabasisphenoid, a fused bone which forms the front lower portion of the braincase. Meanwhile, in front of the exoccipitals is an attachment for the opisthotic bone, which forms most of the side of the braincase. A small indentation between the opisthotic and exoccipital attachments may be the lagenar recess. This indentation likely held an organ of the inner ear known as the lagena, which in mammals develops into the spiral-shaped cochlea.

Above the occipital condyle is the foramen magnum, a very large hole where the spinal cord exits the braincase. The upper rear portion of the braincase (as well as potentially the upper edge of the foramen magnum) is formed by the supraoccipital bone. As with other archosauriforms, the rear edge of this bone is acutely angled, terminating in a large keel edged by smooth areas for the attachment of muscles that raise the head. The side of the supraoccipital and a keel on the underside of the parietal bones meet along the side of the braincase, where they contact a downward-pointing spur known as the paroccipital process. The prootic bone, which forms the upper front part of the braincase, possesses a forward-pointing pit for the trigeminal nerve, with the area below the pit being smooth as in advanced archosauriforms. The front of the braincase also has a long and thick forward-pointing bone known as a laterosphenoid. This bone arches outwards but converges along the midline at its front tip.

==== Lower jaw ====
The majority of the lower jaw is formed by the dentary, which possess diverse teeth similar to those of the maxilla and premaxilla. The first few are large and conical, and the fourth or fifth tooth is yet another enlarged caniniform tooth. Unlike the maxillary caniniform tooth which is serrated on both the front and rear edges, the dentary caniform is serrated on only the rear edge. Dentary teeth past the caniform are similar to those in the rear part of the maxilla. The outer face of the dentary also has a depression near the tooth row about midway down the length of the bone. This depression would have received the maxillary fang while the mouth was closed, similar to how the diastema at the front of the maxilla would have received the dentary fang. The surangular and angular (a pair of untoothed bones in the rear part of the lower jaw) are deep. The articular bone, which houses the jaw joint at the rear end of the lower jaw, is concave and opens towards the rear, similar to that of phytosaurs. Most archosauriforms possess a hole known as a mandibular fenestra where the dentary, angular, and surangular meet. However, it cannot be determined if Vancleavea also possessed this hole. It is plausible that it was lost through evolution (as is the case with the antorbital and supratemporal fenestrae), but there is also the possibility that it was too small to be noticeable in the preserved Vancleavea skull. A small and sometimes overlooked mandibular fenestra is present in Proterosuchus, one of the first archosauriforms to evolve.

=== Vertebrae ===
Size comparison

The cervicals (neck vertebrae) are much longer than they are tall, creating a moderately long neck. Seen from below, they are "pinched" midway down the length of the centrum (main body of each vertebra) by large pits. The centra are also slightly procoelous, with a concave front surface and convex rear surface. The underside of the centra has a large, rectangular keel with an unusually straight lower edge. As is typical for reptiles, the vertebrae connect to each other with interlocking plates above the centra known as zygapophyses. More unusually, the rear joint plates (postzygapophyses) also possess additional spurs which do not connect to the following vertebrae. These extra spurs, known as epipophyses, are most common in dinosaurs but now known to exist in other types of extinct archosauromorphs.

The dorsals (back vertebrae) are also long, and also possess "pinched" centra. Unlike the procoelous cervicals, the dorsals are amphicoelous with both the front and rear surface being concave. A pair of large and cylindrical outgrowths extend perpendicular to each centrum, at the front edge of their respective vertebrae. These outgrowths, currently identified as diapophyses, would have connected to ribs. Some dorsals of Vancleavea are also characteristic in the possession of a shallow groove which extends down the underside of each centrum, bordered by a pair of keels. A large, plate-like structure known as a neural spine juts out of the top of each vertebra. These neural spines are thin seen from the front but broad when seen from the side. They are roughly keystone-shaped, with notches at both the upper front and rear corner, as well as a convex upper portion covered with small grooves. There is some variety between dorsals in different specimens, with some dorsals having only slight keels or additional rib facets (known as parapophyses) to complement the diapophyses. At least some of the ribs of Vancleavea were thick-walled, strongly curved, and connected to the dorsal vertebrae at two points (hence why some vertebrae had two facets per rib).

The two sacrals (hip vertebrae) are shorter and simpler than the dorsals. Rather than possessing the pinched sides of dorsals, they instead have massive facets for sacral ribs which connect the spinal column to the hip bones. Some specimens retain the characteristic double keels of the dorsal centra, but in other specimens they fuse into a single keel. The numerous caudals (tail vertebrae) are much more slender, and are roughly rectangular when seen from below. Towards the tip of the tail, they become increasingly simple and elongated, losing their rib facets. Nevertheless, they always retain large paired keels along their underside. They possess tall and thin neural spines as well as chevrons, similar structures which extend from the underside of the centra. Both the neural spines and chevrons are angled back, but they are long enough to create a deep tail regardless.

=== Forelimbs ===
The scapula (shoulder blade) of Vancleavea was hourglass shaped, with the front and rear edges being strongly concave and the upper and lower edges being somewhat convex. Most of the bone is thin from side-to-side, with the exception of the glenoid (shoulder socket), which is thickened in an outwards direction. A small bump is present midway down the front edge of the bone. This bump is considered to be the same feature as the acromion process of humans.

The humerus (upper arm bone) is rather simple, with a rounded head that forms the "ball" part of a ball-and-socket joint with the glenoid socket. The front outer edge of the bone has a low and rounded ridge known as a deltopectoral crest. Knob-like structures (condyles) are present at the underside of the distal portion of the bone. The radial condyle (capitulum) at the front is sometimes smaller than the ulnar condyle (trochlea) at the middle, which connects to an additional rear-facing "entepicondyle"(which in humans is twisted inwards as the medial epicondyle). These different knobs are all somewhat continuous with each other, with no deep grooves separating each of them. The ulna and radius (lower arm bones) are also rather simple, although certain features (such as convex outermost joints) are shared with other archosauriforms. The manus (hand), although jumbled in GR 138 (the only specimen to preserve forelimbs), still possessed recognizable elements such as metacarpals (main hand bones) and short phalanges (finger bones). The innermost (first) and outermost (fifth) metacarpals, which would have connected to the thumb and little finger in humans, are the shortest parts of the hand. The second metacarpal is longer, and the third and fourth are tied for the longest bones of the hand. Unguals (claws) have not been found, and the rounded ends of certain phalanges indicates that Vancleavea likely did not possess them.

=== Hip and hindlimbs ===
==== Hip ====
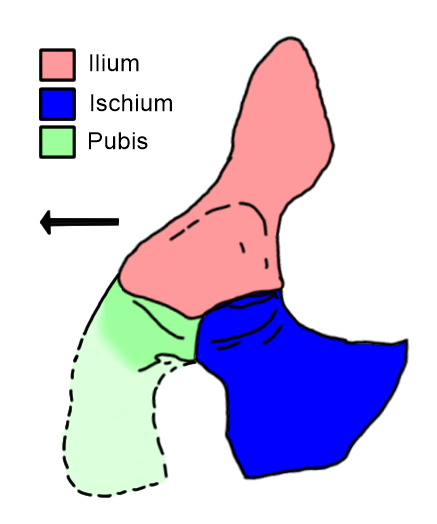
The pelvis (hip) of Vancleavea, composited from multiple specimens. The pubis is reconstructed from that of its close relatives.

As with other reptiles, each hip of Vancleavea is formed by three plate-like bones: the ilium (above the hip socket), the pubis (in front of the hip socket), and the ischium (behind the hip socket). The ilium of Vancleavea is particularly unusual. Most archosauriforms have ilia which are somewhat low, directed from front to back (anteroposteriorly). However, the ilium of Vancleavea is short in this direction, instead slanting upwards and slightly backwards to form a leaf-shaped blade on top of a pinched "neck". The only other archosauromorphs known to possess a similar ilium is the arboreal drepanosaur Megalancosaurus and the heavily armored archosauriform Doswellia, although the latter's ilium also bends outwards at a 90 degree angle to the main part of the hip. The lower portion of the ilium is mostly formed by the acetabulum (hip socket), and has a triangular lower edge which wedges between the other two bones of the hip.

The pubis is incomplete, but possesses a knob-shaped rear branch (posterior process) which extends under the acetabulum. This branch contacts the ischium along a straight edge, although part of their connection is left open as a notch which partially or completely enclosed the obturator foramen. The ischium is fan-shaped and points backwards and downwards. When seen from the front, the two ischia (on either side of the body) converge at the rear edges of each. Although the majority of the acetabulum is formed by the lower portion of the ilium, a noticeable portion is also formed by the upper portion of the ischium and a tiny sliver of the socket is formed by the upper portion of the pubis.

==== Leg ====
The top part of the S-shaped femur (thigh bone) is paddle-like and oval-shaped in cross-section. It includes a noticeable, but not strongly offset 'head'. The upper portion of the wide rear/inner face of the femur sometimes has a small ridge. This ridge, which is not present in every femur referred to Vancleavea, is believed to be an area for the attachment of the powerful caudofemoralis muscle which helps to pull the leg back. This ridge is believed to be synonymous with the fourth trochanter of archosaurs as well as the internal trochanter of basal archosauriforms. The midshaft of the femur is circular in cross-section. The lower portion of the femur includes both a medial condyle (which connects to the tibia) and a lateral condyle (which connects to the fibula), although neither of these knobs are particularly strongly developed. In general, the femur of Vancleavea is intermediate in structure between basal archosauriforms and archosaurs. The tibia and fibula (lower leg bones) are both slightly curved away from the center of the leg. They are also thinnest at their respective midshafts. The front edge of the tibia possesses a sharp ridge known as a cnemial crest, which extends about two thirds the way down the shaft. The fibula is thinner and somewhat twisted compared to the tibia.

==== Ankle and foot ====
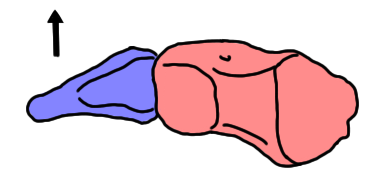
The left ankle of Vancleavea seen in proximal view (i.e. with the tibial and fibular joints facing the viewer), with the calcaneum in blue and the astragalus in pink.

Like most other archosauromorphs, the ankle is formed by two notable bones: the calcaneum, which connects to the fibula on the outer side of the heel, and the astragalus, which connects to both the tibia and the fibula on the inner part of the heel. The astragalus has facets for the tibia and fibula as well as a gap between the two facets, known as a non-articular notch. The facet for the tibia stretches down the inner edge of the astragalus, but not along the rear edge. This is similar to the situation in basal archosauriforms but contrasts with that of more advanced taxa which have a more sprawling tibial facet. The outer edge of the astragalus (which connects to the calcaneum) is also convex like basal archosauriforms. The calcaneum is small and triangular. The outer edge has a spur which points outwards and slightly downwards. Although this spur (formally known as a calcaneal tuber) is common in many archosauriforms, that of Vancleavea is unique in having a 'squashed' shape, with the upper/front and lower/rear surfaces meeting each other at a rounded outer apex. Similar to advanced archosauriforms, Vancleavea only possessed two distal tarsal bones in the ankle (apart from the calcaneum and astragalus), rather than four as in more basal members of the group. The main portion of the foot is formed by four thin metatarsal bones and a much shorter fifth metatarsal, each of which probably connect to a short toe. However, the bones of the foot are jumbled even in complete specimens such as GR 138, making it difficult to assign a specific location to any metatarsal or toe bone.

=== Osteoderms ===
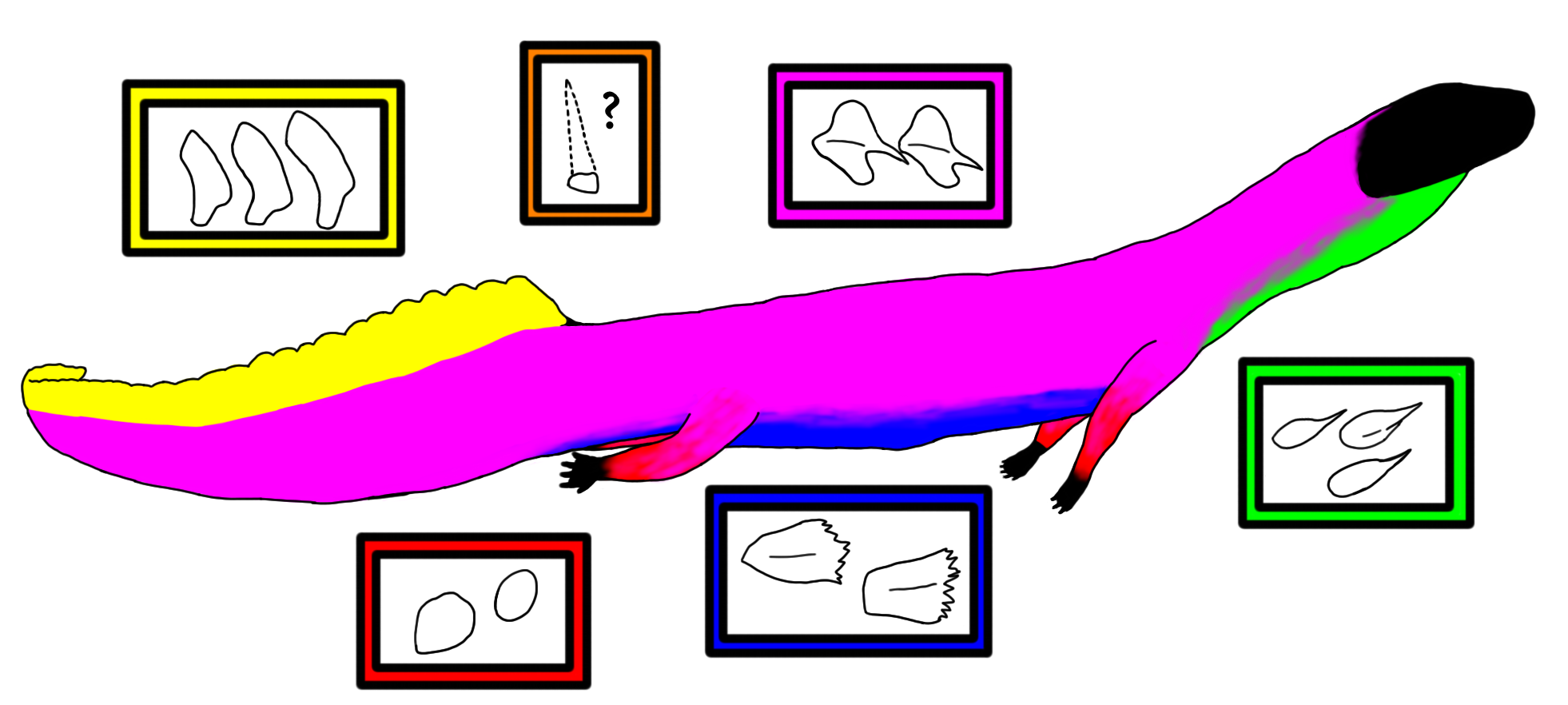
A diagram showing the distribution of the five to six different osteoderm morphologies possessed by Vancleavea campi.

The body is heavily armored, coated in various bony plates known as osteoderms. There are five to six distinct osteoderm morphotypes (i.e. variants) which are expressed at different parts of the body. Hunt, Lucas, & Spielmann (2005) were the first paleontologists to use morphotypes to describe Vancleavea osteoderms, but their designations differed from those in later studies such as Nesbitt et al. (2009), which are used here. The throat region, between the shoulder and jaws, possesses "morphotype A" osteoderms, which are teardrop-shaped and sometimes keeled, with a pointed front tip and rounded rear edge. "Morphotype B" osteoderms cover the back and sides of the body. They all tightly overlap and possess front spurs and low keels, but the osteoderms that form several rows on the back are more symmetrical and diamond-shaped. The osteoderms on the sides, on the other hand, are asymmetrical, with a smaller lower portion (below the keel) that slants forwards, a front spur that dips slightly downwards, and a rear tip that is more pointed than those of the back osteoderms.

The osteoderms that cover the belly, known as "morphotype C" osteoderms, are of a type unique to Vancleavea. They are large, boxy, and rounded, with large keels and heavily serrated front edges. This morphotype has been compared to the armor of ankylosaurs. The upper side of the tail also possesses very characteristic and unusual osteoderms, designated as "morphotype D". These are elongated plates that stick up from the tail, with one plate per vertebra. They are wide at their base but flattened (from the side) elsewhere, and also acquire a swept-back orientation. In life, they would probably have been connected by soft tissue to form a tail fin to assist swimming. The morphotype D osteoderms are largest towards the front of the tail and gradually decrease in height and overall size towards the tip. The sides of the tail are covered with morphotype B osteoderms.

The limbs are covered with "morphotype E" osteoderms. These plates are smaller, rounder and thinner than the osteoderms of the body. A sixth type of osteoderm, which may or may not belong to Vancleavea, was also reported in 1995. This osteoderm, of which only the base is known, is comparable to the tail spike of a Stegosaurus. Large, spike-like osteoderms were not present in GR 138, which was otherwise a complete skeleton with all of the other osteoderms in the same positions they were in life. It is conceivable that the "Stegosaurus spike" osteoderm was actually misplaced from the skeleton of an aetosaur, although the spikes of aetosaurs known from Vancleavea-bearing fossil sites differed from the "Stegosaurus spike".

== Classification ==
Phylogenetic position of Vancleavea

- 1
  - Mesosuchus
  - 2
    - Proterosuchus
    - - Erythrosuchus
      - - Euparkeria
        - - Chanaresuchus
          - 3
            - Leptosuchus
            - - Postosuchus
              - Desmatosuchus
          - Vancleavea
          - Doswellia
          - Turfanosuchus
  - - Megalancosaurus
    - Prolacerta
  1 Archosauromorpha, 2 Archosauriformes, 3 Archosauria

Parker & Barton 2008

Before the genus was described 1995, an additional specimen consisting of fragmentary skull material found by Charles Camp in 1923 was suggested to belong to a proterochampsid. However, this material was later referred to a new taxon, Acallosuchus rectori, after having been shown to be distinct from the postcranial material found in 1962. In the initial description of Vancleavea, the genus was referred to Neodiapsida incertae sedis along with A. rectori.

A 2008 phylogenetic study tentatively suggested that Vancleavea was a basal archosauriform more derived than Erythrosuchus, Proterosuchus, and possibly even Euparkeria. In a new 2009 study, Vancleavea was found to be more closely related to Archosauria than both Erythrosuchus and Proterosuchus, and was also found to be outside of the crown group, with Euparkeria remaining the closest sister taxon of Archosauria. Claims of a close relation between Vancleavea and thalattosaurs have been thoroughly debunked by paleontologists such as David Marjanovic and Jaime Headden.

Controversy still remains as to whether or not the specimens referred to this genus are representative of a "single species-level taxon or a clade of closely related taxa that lived through much of the Late Triassic of North America, given the poor fossil record of the taxon." Differences in the osteoderms as well as the shape of the internal tuberosity of the humerus in different specimens may suggest that they belong to different taxa, but because of the fragmentary preservation of these fossils, unambiguous autapomorphies cannot be distinguished that would indicate that there are different taxa.

Some publications support the placement of Vancleavea within Proterochampsia as a member of the family Doswelliidae. However, the discovery of Litorosuchus, the closest relative of Vancleavea, has cast doubt on this hypothesis.

== Paleobiology ==
Vancleavea has features that suggest a semi-aquatic lifestyle. These include the long body, short limbs, and deep tail. Vancleavea is unique among archosauriforms and tetrapods in general in that the fin-like tail is deepened by elongated osteoderms rather than tall neural spines.
