= Ischigualasto-Villa Unión Basin =

Sedimentary basin in the Argentine Northwest

- Cuenca de Ischigualasto-Villa Unión
- Location of the basin in Argentina

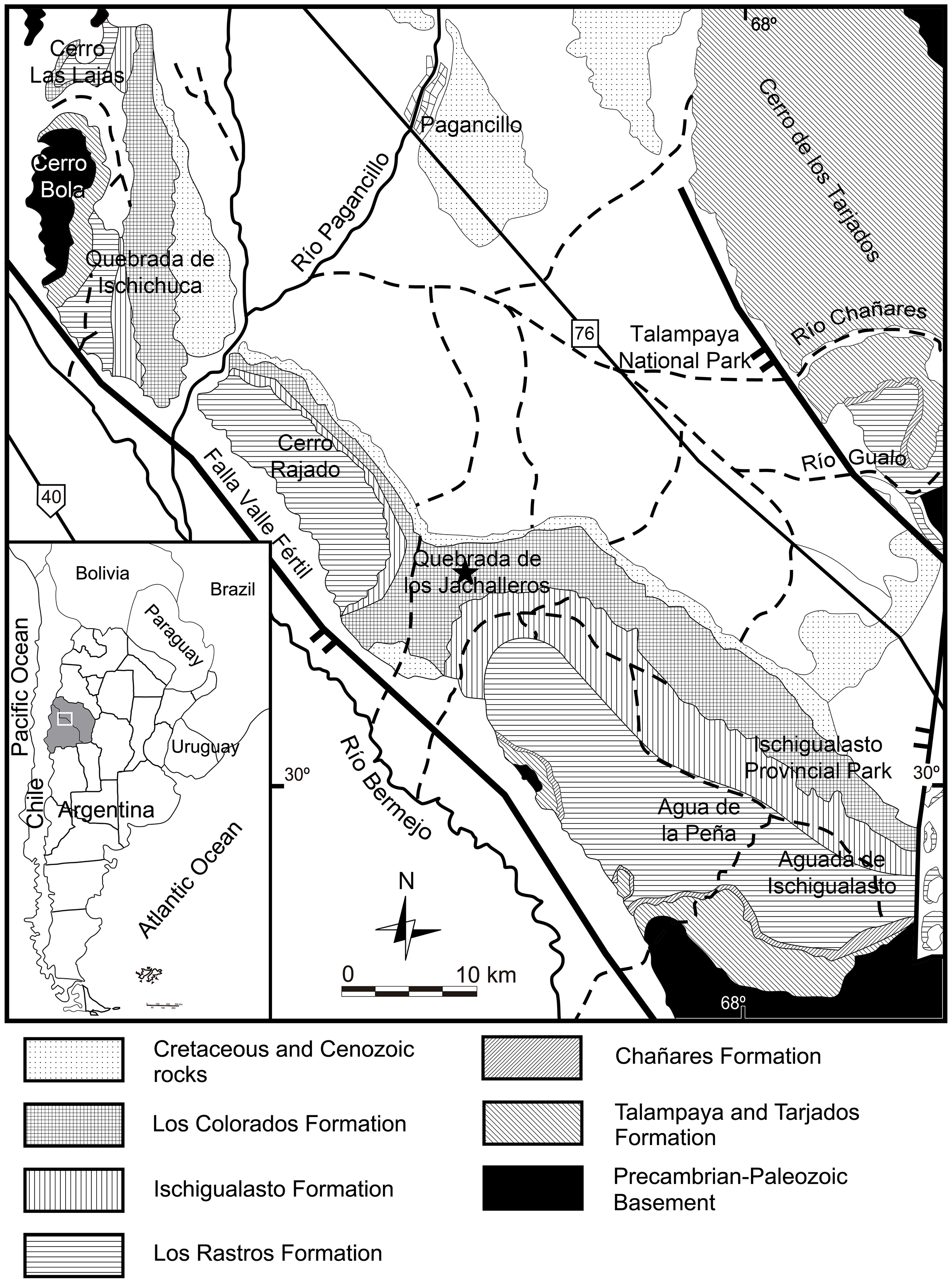
- Geologic map of the Ischigualasto-Villa Unión Basin - detail
- Coordinates: 29°32′S 68°05′W
- Location: Southern South America
- Region: Argentine Northwest
- Country: Argentina
- States: La Rioja & San Juan Provinces
- Cities: Villa Unión

Characteristics
- On/Offshore: Onshore
- Boundaries: Sierras Pampeanas (N & E), El Alto Fault (SE), Valle Fértil Fault (W)
- Part of: Triassic rift basins
- Area: ~80,000 km^{2} (31,000 sq mi)

Hydrology
- River: Talampaya River

Geology
- Basin type: Rift
- Plate: South American
- Orogeny: Break-up of Pangea (Early Triassic); Andean (Cenozoic)
- Age: Late Permian-Late Triassic
- Stratigraphy: Stratigraphy

The Ischigualasto-Villa Unión Basin (Spanish: Cuenca de Ischigualasto-Villa Unión) is a small sedimentary basin located in the Argentine Northwest, Argentina. It is located in the southwestern part of La Rioja Province and the northeastern part of San Juan Province. The basin borders the Sierras Pampeanas in the east, the western boundary of the basin is formed by the Valle Fértil Fault, bordering the Precordillera, and it is bound in the southeast by the El Alto Fault, separating the basin from the Marayes-El Carrizal Basin.

The basin started forming in the Late Permian, with the break-up of Pangea, when extensional tectonics, including rifting, formed several basins in Gondwana; present-day South America, Africa, Antarctica, India and Australia. The accommodation space in the Ischigualasto-Villa Unión Basin was filled by an approximately 3.5 kilometres (11,000 ft) thick succession of volcaniclastic, eolian, alluvial, fluvial and lacustrine deposits in various geologic formations. The Cenozoic evolution of the basin is mainly influenced by the Andean orogeny, producing folding and faulting in the basin.

The basin is of paleontological significance as it hosts several fossiliferous stratigraphic units providing many fossils of early dinosaurs, synapsids, turtles, mammals, the earliest crocodylomorphs, fish, amphibians and flora, as well as ichnofossils. The Ischigualasto Provincial Park and Talampaya National Park in the basin were designated UNESCO World Heritage Sites in 2000.

== Description ==
The Ischigualasto-Villa Unión was recognized as a sedimentary basin by Stipanicic and Bonaparte in 1979. The basin stretches across a small area in northeastern San Juan Province and southwestern La Rioja Province in northwestern Argentina. The basin is bound by the Valle Fértil Fault to the west, separating the basin from the Precordillera, and the El Alto Fault in the southeast, forming the boundary with the Marayes-El Carrizal Basin. To the northeast, the basin ranges to the Sierras Pampeanas. The basin is a rift basin that started forming early in the break-up of Pangea and its southern latitude paleocontinent Gondwana in the Late Permian to Early Triassic, providing a sedimentary column of approximately 3.5 kilometres (11,000 ft) of Triassic sediments.

The area of the basin is sparsely populated, with Villa Unión in the north of the basin. The Talampaya and Chañares Rivers cross the basin.

== Stratigraphy ==
The stratigraphy of the Ischigualasto-Villa Unión Basin contains sediments of the Triassic. The earliest deposition occurred in the Early Triassic (Olenekian) with the redbeds of the Talampaya and Tarjados Formations. This sequence is separated from the overlying Agua de la Peña Group by a regional unconformity.

Age	Group	Formation	Sequence	Environment	Maximum thickness	Notes
Quaternary	alluvium					
Neogene	Hiatus					
Paleogene	Hiatus					
Cretaceous	Hiatus					
Jurassic	Hiatus					
Norian	Agua de la Peña	Los Colorados Formation	Second post-rift	Fluvial-lacustrine	1,000 m (3,300 ft)	
Carnian	Agua de la Peña	Ischigualasto Formation	Second syn-rift	Floodplain	900 m (3,000 ft)	
Carnian	Agua de la Peña	Los Rastros Formation	First post-rift	Deltaic-lacustrine	1,000 m (3,300 ft)	
Carnian	Agua de la Peña	Chañares Formation / Ischichuca Formation	First syn-rift	Fluvial-lacustrine	70 m (230 ft)	
Angular unconformity	Agua de la Peña					
Early-Mid Triassic	Paganzo	Tarjados Formation	Pre-rift	Arid fluvial	250 m (820 ft)	
Olenekian	Paganzo	Talampaya Formation	Pre-rift	Aeolian-fluvial	400 m (1,300 ft)	
Angular unconformity
Paleozoic	Basement	Tuminico Formation				
Precambrian	Basement	Valle Fértil Complex				

== Paleontological significance ==
The Ischigualasto-Villa Unión Basin is renowned for hosting the Triassic-age lagerstätten of the Chañares and Ischigualasto formations. These units have produced numerous fossils of synapsids and reptiles, including the earliest known dinosaurs. Other fossiliferous units within the basin have preserved fish, insects, flora, and ichnofossils. The basin represents one of three locations in Argentina where Triassic trackways were found, together with the Cuyo Basin to the south and Los Menucos Basin in Río Negro Province.

Many of the earliest known crocodylomorphs come from the Ischigulasto-Villa Unión Basin. In the Los Colorados Formation, the crocodylomorphs Hemiprotosuchus leali and Coloradisuchus abelini were found.

== See also ==
- Paraná Basin, containing many Triassic fossiliferous formations in southeastern Brazil and northwestern Argentina
- Cuyo Basin, of northwestern Argentina
- Salta Basin, of northwestern Argentina
- Neuquén Basin, of western Argentina
- Cañadón Asfalto Basin, of central-southern Argentina
