= Villa San Agustín =

Villa San Agustín San Agustín del Valle Fértil.
- City and Municipality
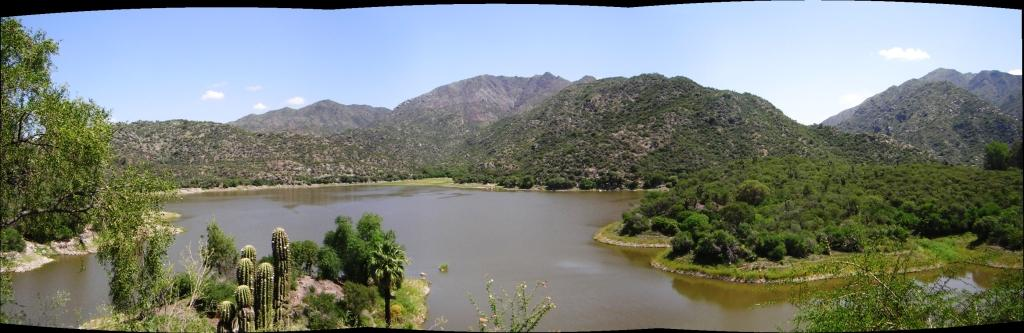

- Location within Argentina
- Coordinates: 30°38′01″S 67°27′59″W
- Country: Argentina
- Province: San Juan
- Department: Valle Fértil
- Founded: 4 April 1776
- Founded by: Pedro Pablo de Quiroga

Government
  - Intendente: Francisco Elizondo (Partido Justicialista)
- Elevation: 828 m (2,717 ft)

Population (2001 census)
  - Total: 3,900
- Time zone: UTC−3 (ART)
- Postal code: J5449
- Telephone prefix: 02646
- Language: Spanish

Villa San Agustín, San Agustín de Valle Fértil or San Agustín is the capital city, center of institutional activities and governmental authorities of the department of Valle Fértil. It is located in the center of the administrative unit, 250 km northeast of the city of San Juan and in the center of the province, in Argentina.

Pedro Pablo de Quiroga founded San Agustín on April 4, 1776. It presents an urban area, where the main institutional and administrative buildings of the department of Valle Fértil are concentrated. In the department, there is a certain combination of rural and urban life and its economy is mostly based on services – especially housing – for tourists, whose destination is predominantly the Ischigualasto Provincial Park.

Its main access roads are provincial routes 510, 511 and the brand new Route 150 that is part of the Corredor Bioceánico

== History ==
Since the 16th century, the Cuyan territory was inhabited by indigenous communities, among which the Huarpes, the Capayanes, the Olongastas and the Yacampis (a Diaguita group of La Rioja).

== Geography ==
San Agustin del Valle Fertíl is located 250 kilometers northeast of the city of San Juan. East of the Province of San Juan, the Department of Valle Fertíl is lying on the eastern slope of the Sierras Pampeanas. Along the valley, there is a lush vegetation of great variety and beauty, a different picture to the rest of the context of the province

=== Climate ===
The climate is semiarid with moderate temperatures. It has a lot of rainfall on average and long sunshine hours characterize summer.

=== Population ===
It counts 3,900 inhabitants (INDEC, 2001), which represents an increase of 33.2% compared to the 2,928 inhabitants (INDEC, 1991) of previous census

=== Seismicity ===
The seismicity of the area of Cuyo (west central Argentina) is common, but of low intensity, and a seismic silence means severe earthquakes every 20 years in different random areas.

Caucete earthquake 1977
On November 23, 1977, an earthquake devastated the region, causing some victims, and a significant percentage of damage to buildings.

1861 earthquake
Even if such catastrophic geologic activity occurs since prehistoric ages, the earthquake of March 20, 1861 marked an important milestone in the history of Argentine seismic events, since it was the strongest recorded and documented in the country.

From that, policy of the successive municipal governments has been taking extreme care, restricting construction regulations. Moreover, with the 1944 San Juan earthquake of January 15, 1944, the government of San Juan declared the state of severe seismic activity of the region.

The Day of Civil Defense was institutionalized by a decree in order to remember the earthquake that destroyed the city of Caucete on November 23, 1977, and made more than 40,000 people homeless. They were not ground fault records, and the most noticeable effect of the earthquake was the extensive area of liquefaction (possibly thousands of square kilometers). The most dramatic effect of liquefaction was observed in the city, 70 km from the epicenter: large quantities of sand were seen in the cracks of up to 1 m wide and 2 m deep. In some of the houses on those cracks, the ground was covered with more than 1 dm sand.

== Tourism ==
St. Augustine is one of the main attractions of the province, standing out for being a suitable place for rest, in the middle of a quiet environment at the foot of the mountains. There is also an artificial lake, where it is possible to fish and do various water sports. It is also possible to make excursions to the mountains, trekking, photo safaris, bird watching, etc. Valle Fertíl has been documented by film director Jorge Preloran.

Located at the foot of the Sierra de Valle Fertíl, with its streets disposed in a grid plan, San Augustín presents a modern infrastructure for the attention of visitors. The landscape around is mountainous with lush vegetation.

It is possible to practice fishing in the Embalse San Agustin where silversides abound. The town has the infrastructure to accommodate tourists and visitors who decide to spend a few days in the area. La Piedra Pintada, la Meseta Ritual and all the indigenous mortars, represent an additional attraction for anyone interested in the culture of the natives of the area. Traditional handcrafts in leather, fabric and wood may also be admired in the town of La Majadita, near San Agustin. From the town, it is possible to walk to several locations: the Ischigualasto Provincial Park, the Talampaya National Park and El Chiflón (in the neighboring province of La Rioja), the three mountains of Valle Fertíl, the historic olive trees of La Mesada and the Jesuits ruins of Las Tumanas.
