= Tarjados Formation =

Geologic formation in Argentina

- Stratigraphic range: Early-Mid Triassic; ~252–236 Ma
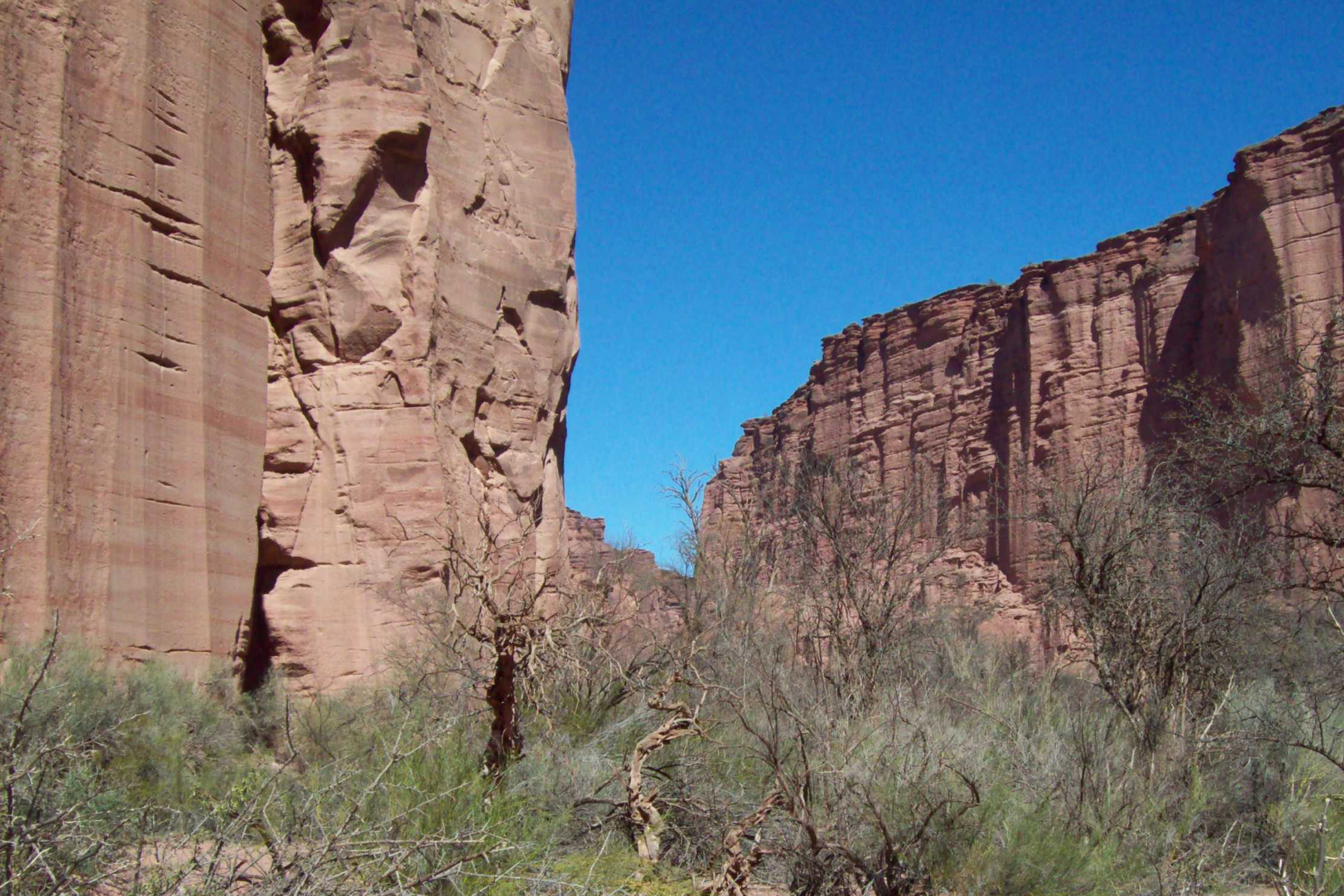
- Sandstones in Talampaya National Park
- Type: Geological formation
- Unit of: Paganzo Group
- Underlies: Chañares Formation
- Overlies: Talampaya Formation
- Thickness: Up to 250 m (820 ft)

Lithology
- Primary: Sandstone
- Other: Conglomerate

Location
- Coordinates: 29.8°S 67.8°W
- Approximate paleocoordinates: 48.0°S 38.9°W
- Region: La Rioja Province
- Country: Argentina
- Extent: Ischigualasto-Villa Unión Basin

Type section
- Named for: Sierra de Los Tarjados
- Named by: Romer & Jensen
- Year defined: 1966
- Tarjados Formation (Argentina)

The Tarjados Formation is an Early to Middle Triassic geologic formation in the Ischigualasto-Villa Unión Basin of La Rioja Province in northwestern Argentina. The red to whitish sandstones and conglomerates of the formation were deposited in an arid fluvial environment. The formation overlies the Talampaya Formation and is overlain by the Chañares Formation of the Agua de la Peña Group.

The formation has provided fossils of an archosaur and a kannemeyeriid dicynodont, both not yet placed in a dedicated genus. The formation crops out in the Talampaya National Park, which was designated a UNESCO World Heritage Site in 2000.

== Description ==
The formation was first defined by Romer and Jensen in 1966, based on a type section exposed in the Sierra de Los Tarjados. The Tarjados Formation, as the underlying Talampaya Formation, belongs to the Paganzo Group.

The formation is exposed in the Talampaya National Park of La Rioja Province. The Tarjados Formation is overlain by the Chañares Formation, separated by a regional unconformity.

The formation, reaching a maximum thickness of 250 metres (820 ft), comprises red to greenish grey sandstones, deposited in an eolian and playa-lacustrine to fluvial environment. The sediments were deposited under arid, or semi-arid conditions.

The formation has provided fossils of an archosaur and a kannemeyeriid dicynodont, both not yet placed in a dedicated genus.

== See also ==
- Santa Maria Formation, contemporaneous fossiliferous formation of the Paraná Basin in southeastern Brazil
- Katberg Formation, contemporaneous fossiliferous formation of the Karoo Basin in South Africa
- Fremouw Formation, contemporaneous fossiliferous formation of Antarctica
