= Talampaya Formation =

Geologic formation in Argentina

- Stratigraphic range: Olenekian; ~251.3–247.2 Ma
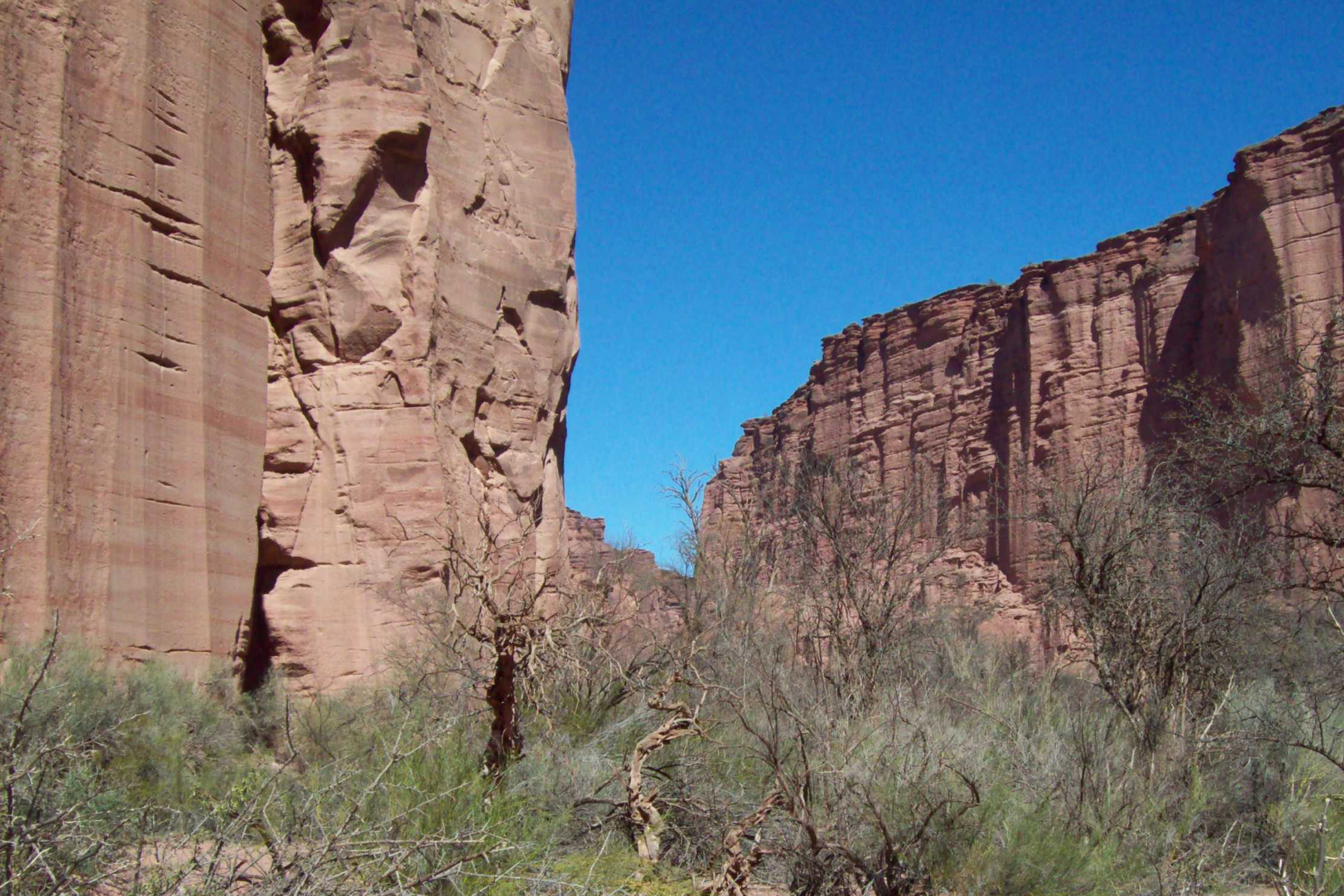
- Sandstones in Talampaya National Park
- Type: Geological formation
- Unit of: Paganzo Group
- Underlies: Tarjados Formation
- Overlies: Basement
- Thickness: Up to 400 m (1,300 ft)

Lithology
- Primary: Sandstone
- Other: Conglomerate, tuff

Location
- Coordinates: 29.6°S 68.1°W
- Approximate paleocoordinates: 46.0°S 40.2°W
- Region: La Rioja Province
- Country: Argentina
- Extent: Ischigualasto-Villa Unión Basin

Type section
- Named for: Talampaya River
- Named by: Romer & Jensen
- Year defined: 1966
- Talampaya Formation (Argentina)

The Talampaya Formation is an Early Triassic (Olenekian) geologic formation in the Ischigualasto-Villa Unión Basin of La Rioja Province in northwestern Argentina. The pink to red sandstones of the formation represent the oldest sedimentary unit in the basin, overlying basement rock and were deposited in a high-energy braided river environment. Ichnofossils, probably left by an archosaur chirotherian, were found in the formation. The formation crops out in the Talampaya National Park, which was designated a UNESCO World Heritage Site in 2000.

== Description ==
The formation was first defined by Romer and Jensen in 1966, based on a type section exposed in the Talampaya River canyon. The Talampaya Formation belongs to the Paganzo Group.

The formation represents the oldest sedimentary unit in the Ischigualasto-Villa Unión Basin in the Talampaya National Park of La Rioja Province, overlying Paleozoic basement, formed by the Tuminico Formation. The Talampaya Formation is overlain by the arid fluvial sandstones and conglomerates of the Tarjados Formation, eroding the Talampaya Formation.

The formation, reaching a maximum thickness of 400 metres (1,300 ft) with a general thickness of approximately 260 metres (850 ft), comprises pink to reddish sandstones, deposited in a fluvial environment, dominated by high-energy braided rivers producing sheet floods. The sediments were deposited under uniform climatic conditions with temperate to warm temperatures and high humidity. Other facies recognized in the formation are alluvial fan deposits with thin tuffaceous beds and conglomerates, covered by a section of basaltis and other volcanic agglomerates and eolian sandstones.

Tetrapod ichnofossils, probably belonging to a chirotherian (and possibly an archosaur), were discovered in the formation southeast of Pagancillo by Argentina paleontologist José Bonaparte in 1964.

== See also ==
- Sanga do Cabral Formation, contemporaneous fossiliferous formation of the Paraná Basin in southeastern Brazil
- Katberg Formation, contemporaneous fossiliferous formation of the Karoo Basin in South Africa
- Fremouw Formation, contemporaneous fossiliferous formation of Antarctica
