= Valle Fértil Department =

Valle Fértil Departamento Pocito
- Department
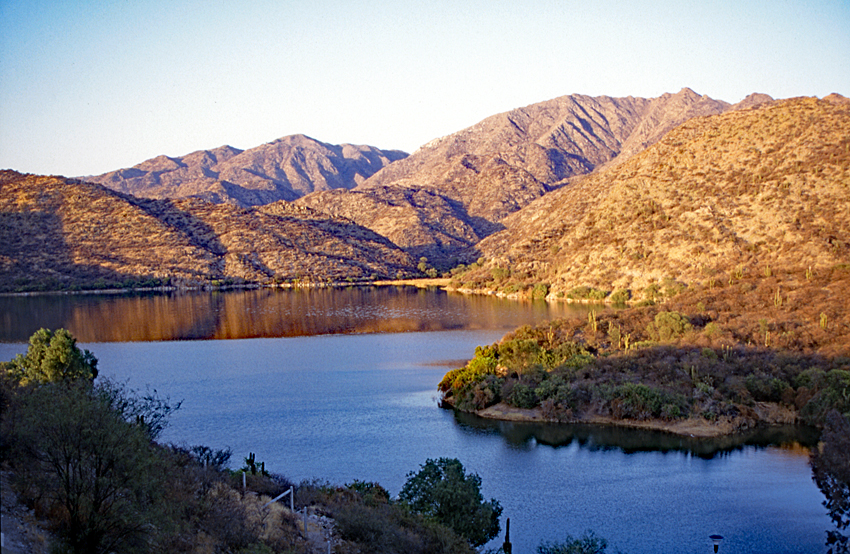
- Lago San Agustin in Valle Fértil

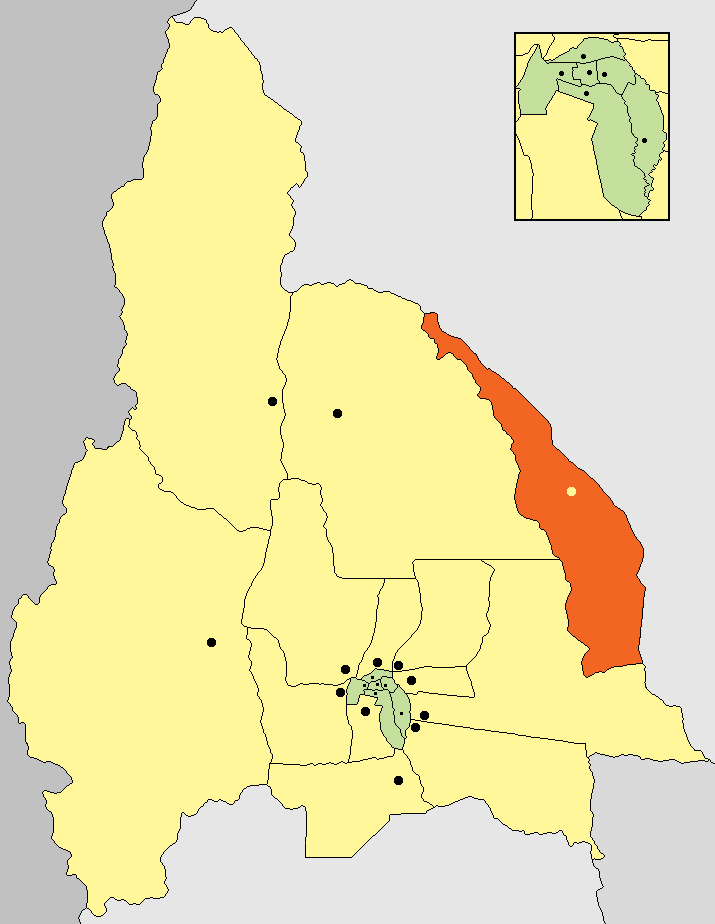
- location of Departamento Valle Fértil in San Juan Province
- Coordinates: 30°40′S 67°26′W
- Country: Argentina
- Seat: Villa San Agustín

Government
  - Intendant: Mario Riveros

Area
  - Total: 6,419 km^{2} (2,478 sq mi)

Population (2001 census [INDEC])
  - Total: 6,864
  - Density: 1.069/km^{2} (2.770/sq mi)
- Demonym: vallista
- Postal Code: 5400
- IFAM: SJU017
- Area Code: 0264
- Patron saint: San Agustín
- Website: www.munivallefertil.gov.ar

Valle Fértil is a department of the province of San Juan (Argentina). Characterized by highly fertile landscapes and contains the Ischigualasto Provincial Park, also known as the Valley of the Moon, which is visited by tourists from around the world.

== Origin of the name ==
The Spaniards, upon their arrival, found the indigenous people referred to the area as "Chaj Nai--Paj", which means "green or fertile country of many rivers".

== Tourism ==
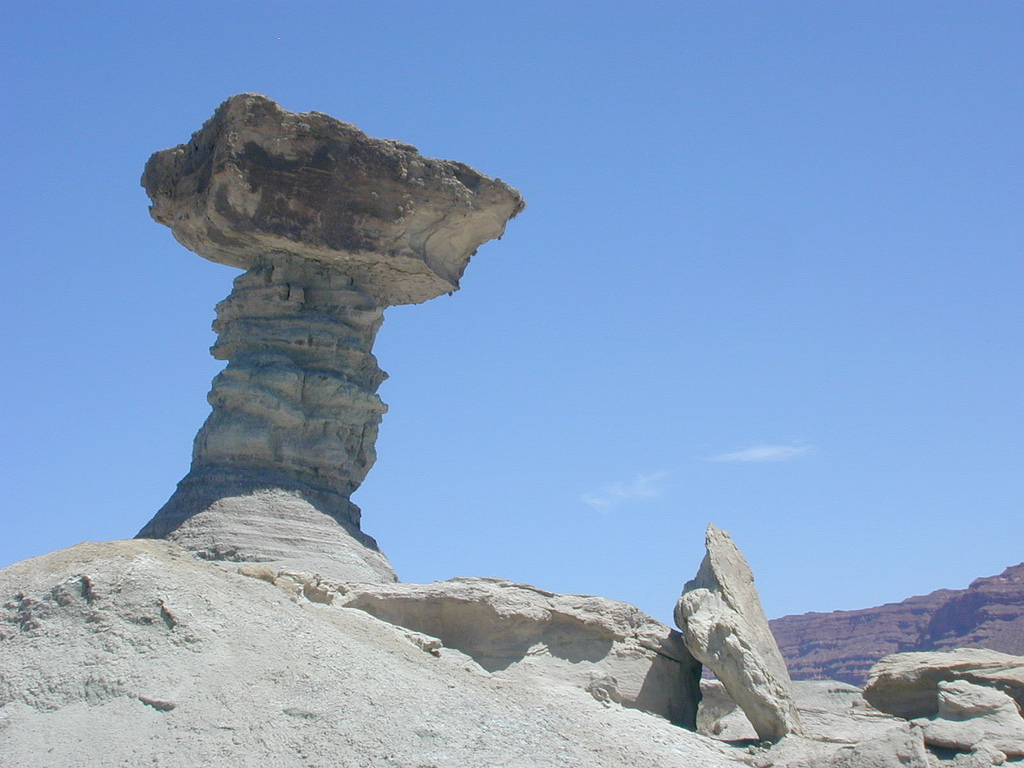
Ischigualasto

The main attraction is Ischigualasto, a strange landscape, in what may have been one of the most interesting stages of the earth's history, the Triassic period, the place known as the Valley of the Moon, for the apparent resemblance to a lunar landscape. It is a protected area for the preservation and study of strange geological formations, wildlife, flora and fossils.
