= Ischigualasto Provincial Park =

Protected area in the San Juan Province, Argentina

- Parque Provincial Ischigualasto; Valle de la Luna
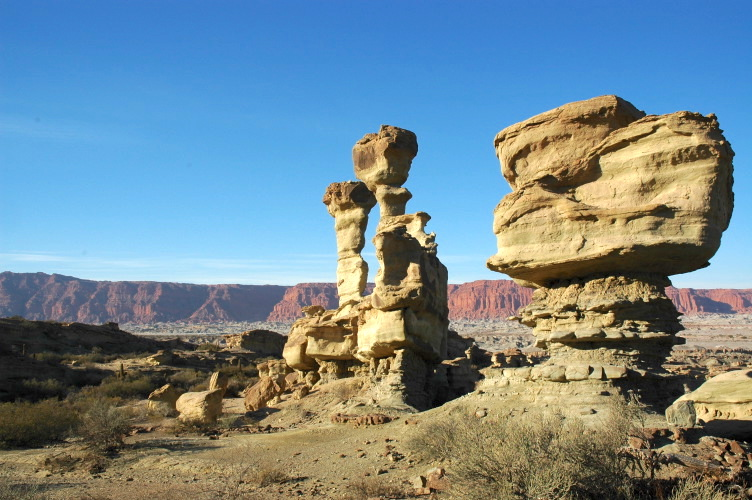
- The Submarine, wind-eroded rock formation

- Location within Argentina
- Location: San Juan Province, Argentina
- Nearest city: San José de Jáchal
- Coordinates: 30°4′S 68°0′W
- Area: 60,370 ha (233.1 sq mi)
- Established: November 3, 1971

UNESCO World Heritage Site
- Official name: Ischigualasto / Talampaya Natural Parks
- Type: Natural
- Criteria: viii
- Reference no.: 966
- Region: Latin America and the Caribbean

Ischigualasto Provincial Park (Spanish: Parque Provincial Ischigualasto), also called Valle de la Luna ("Valley of the Moon" or "Moon Valley"), due to its moon-like appearance, is a provincial protected area in the north-east of San Juan Province, north-western Argentina, limiting to the north with the Talampaya National Park, in La Rioja Province. Both areas belong to the same geological formation, the Ischigualasto Formation (sometimes called the Ischigualasto-Talampaya Formation). Established on 3 November 1971, the park has an area of 60,370 ha (603.7 km^{2}; 233.1 sq mi).

In 2000, UNESCO included Ischigualasto and Talampaya National Park among its World Heritage Sites.

== History ==
The name Ischigualasto is derived from the extinct Cacán language, spoken by an indigenous group referred to as the Diaguita by the Spanish conquistadors and means "place where the moon alights". Another hypothesis gives the name "Ischigualasto" a diaguita origin, meaning "dead land", although some scholars have proposed Huarpe roots.

The first paleontological description of Ischigualasto dates from 1930. In 1941 the area was studied in more detail, which led to the discovery of 70 species of fossil plants. The region received for the first time the name Valle de la Luna in 1943, in a publication edited by the Automobil Club Argentino. That year, Dr. Ángel Cabrera of University of La Plata described the traversodontid Exaeretodon—the first cynodont found in Ischigualasto—after samples sent by a geologist prospecting for coal on behalf of an Argentine mining company.

Academic work and geological prospecting proceeded slowly until 1958, when Dr. Alfred Sherwood Romer, a Harvard University expert in ancient mammals, discovered several rich fossil beds which he described as "extraordinary".

== Description ==
Most of the park lies within the Valle Fértil Department, with a minor part in the Jachal Department of San Juan, at an altitude of about 1,300 m (4,300 ft) amsl. The park is part of the western border of the Central Sierras, and features typical desert vegetation (bushes, cacti and some trees) which covers between 10 and 20% of the area. The climate is very dry, with rainfall mostly during the summer, and temperature extremes (minimum −10 °C or 14 °F, maximum 45 °C or 113 °F). There is a constant southern wind with a speed of 20–40 km/h (12–25 mph) after noon and until the evening, sometimes accompanied by the extremely strong Zonda wind.

Ischigualasto Provincial Park scenery

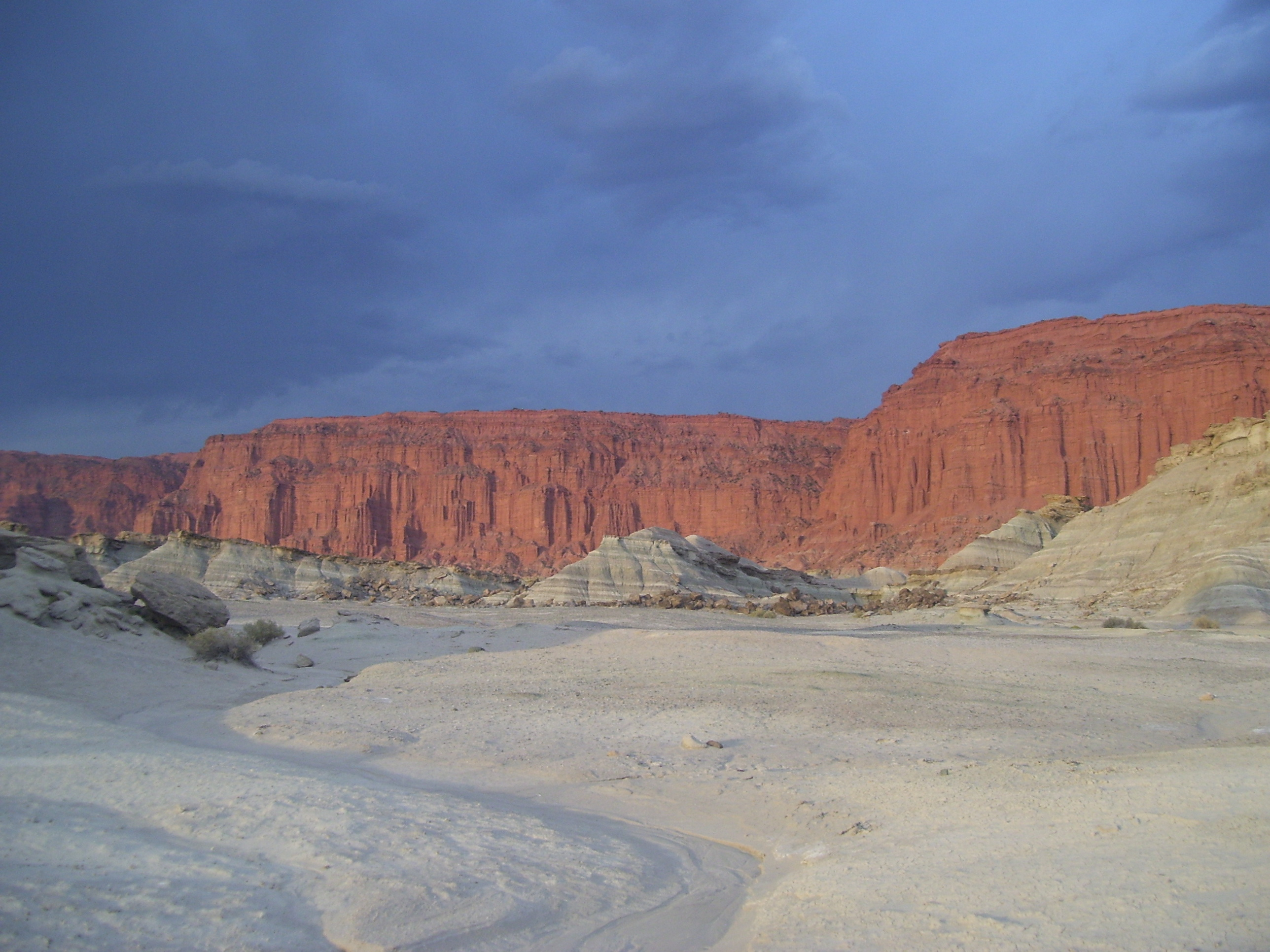
Las Coloradas cliff

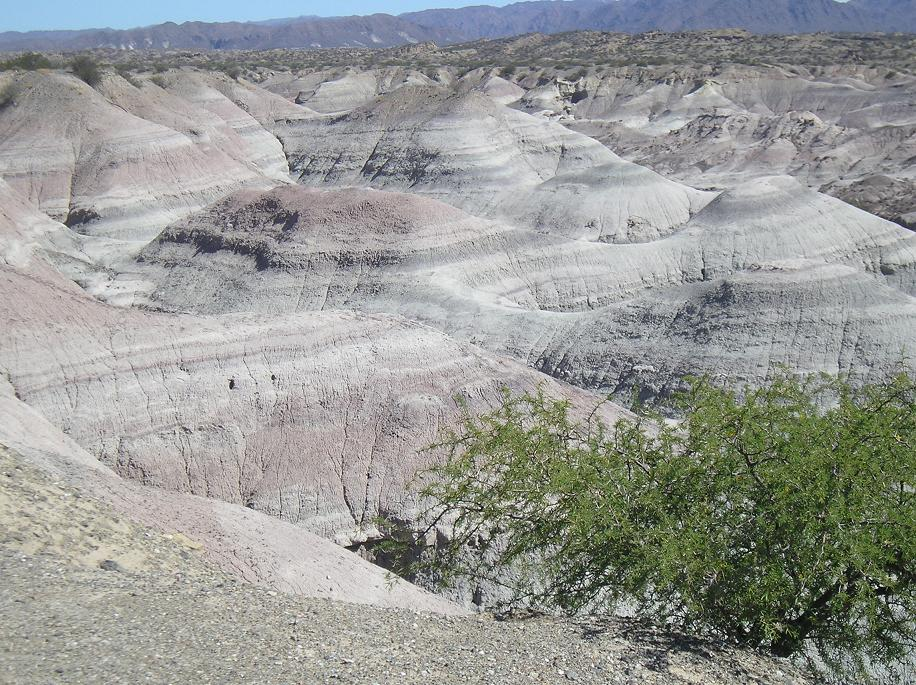
Water-eroded badlands

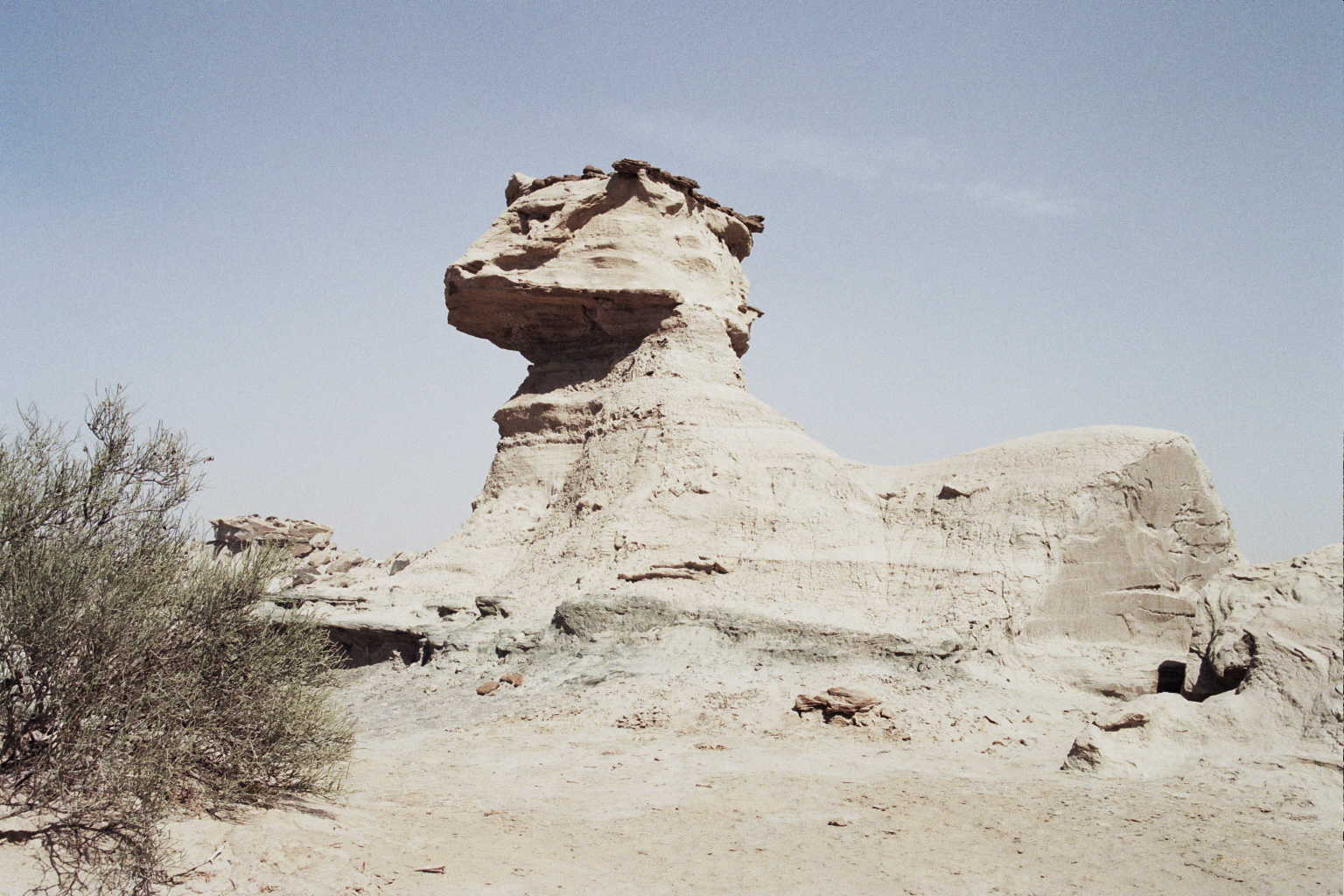
The Sphynx, wind-eroded rock formation

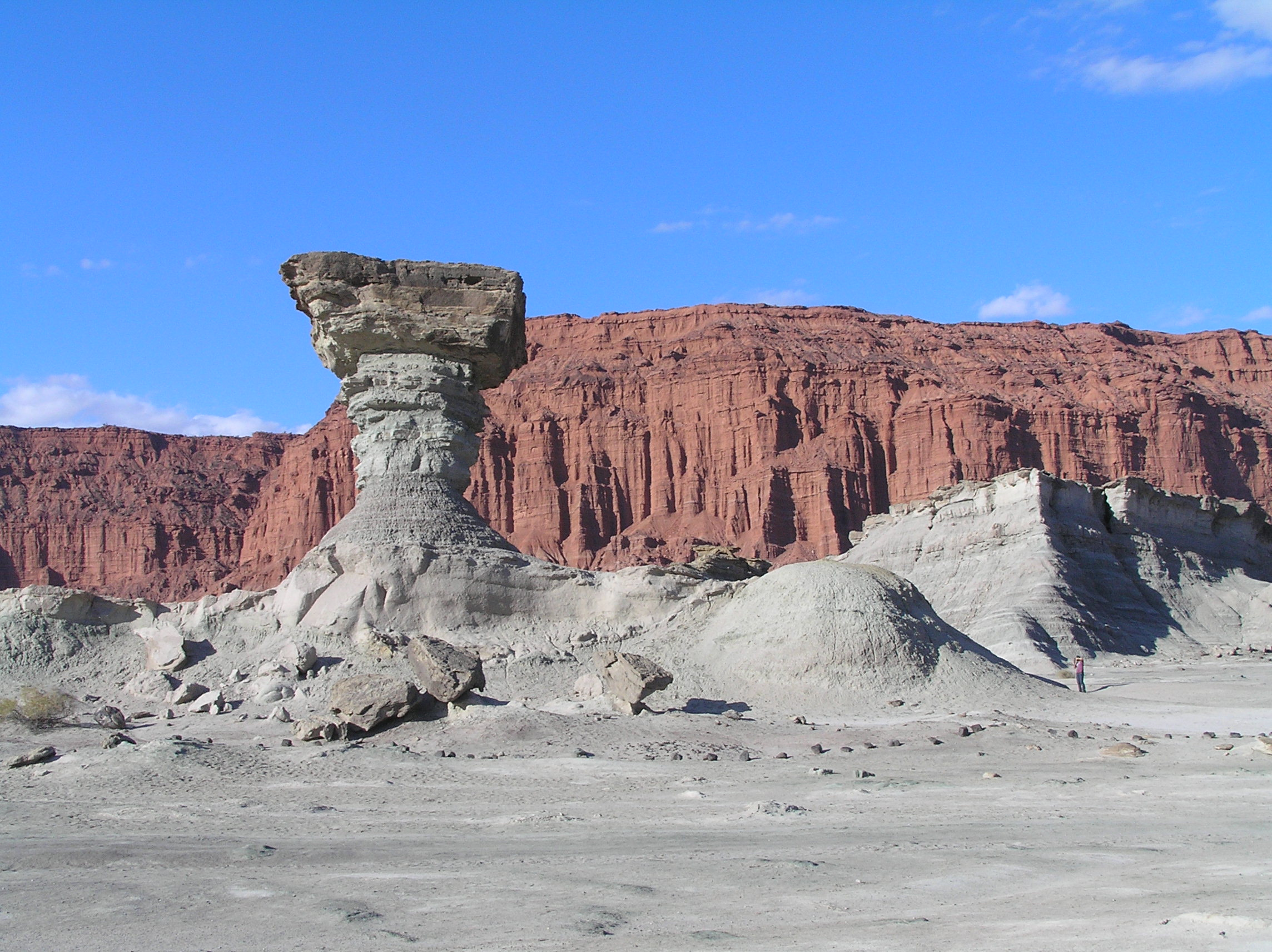
The Mushroom, wind-eroded rock formation

== Paleontology ==
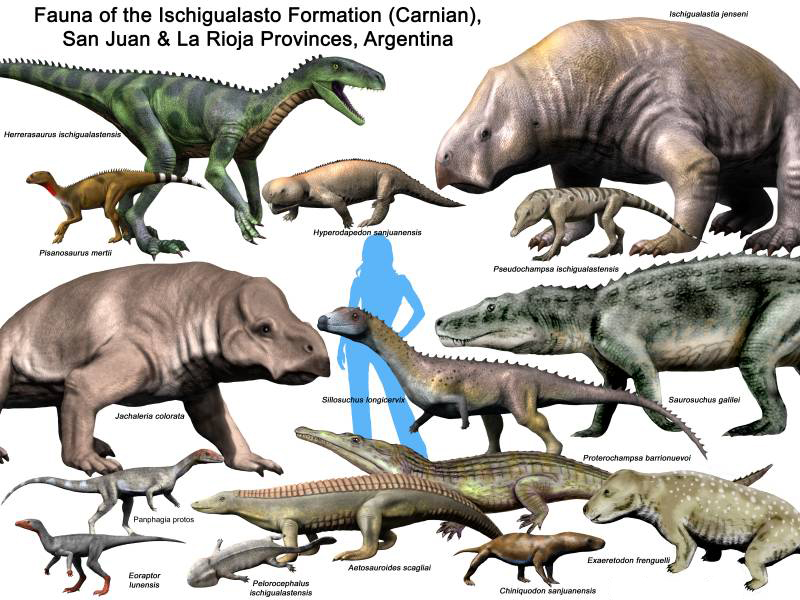
Fauna of the Ischigualasto Formation

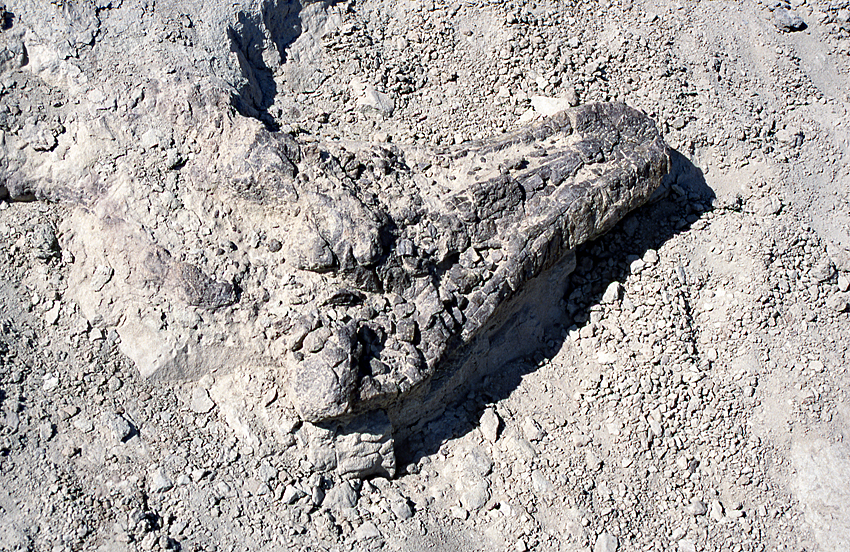
Fossil discovered in Ischigualasto National Park

The Ischigualasto Formation contains Late Triassic (Carnian) deposits (231.4 -225.9 million years before the present), with some of the oldest known dinosaur remains, which are the world's foremost with regards to quality, number and importance.

In the Carnian this area was a volcanically active floodplain dominated by rivers and had a strongly seasonal rainfall. Petrified tree trunks of Protojuniperoxylon ischigualastianus more than 40 m (130 ft) tall attest to a rich vegetation at that time. Fossil ferns and horsetails have also been found.

Rhynchosaurs and cynodonts (especially rhynchosaur Hyperodapedon and cynodont Exaeretodon) are by far the predominant findings among the tetrapod fossils in the park. A study from 1993 found dinosaur specimens to comprise only 6% of the total tetrapod sample; subsequent discoveries increased this number to approximately 11% of all findings. Carnivorous dinosaurs are the most common terrestrial carnivores of the Ischigualasto Formation, with herrerasaurids comprising 72% of all recovered terrestrial carnivores. Dinosaurs of Ischigualasto Formation include early samples of the two major lineages of dinosaurs (ornithischians and saurischians). The carnivorous archosaur Herrerasaurus is the most numerous of these dinosaur fossils. Another important putative dinosaur with primitive characteristics is Eoraptor lunensis, found in Ischigualasto in the early 1990s.

== See also ==
- List of dinosaur-bearing rock formations
