= Talampaya National Park =

National park in Argentina

- IUCN category II (national park)
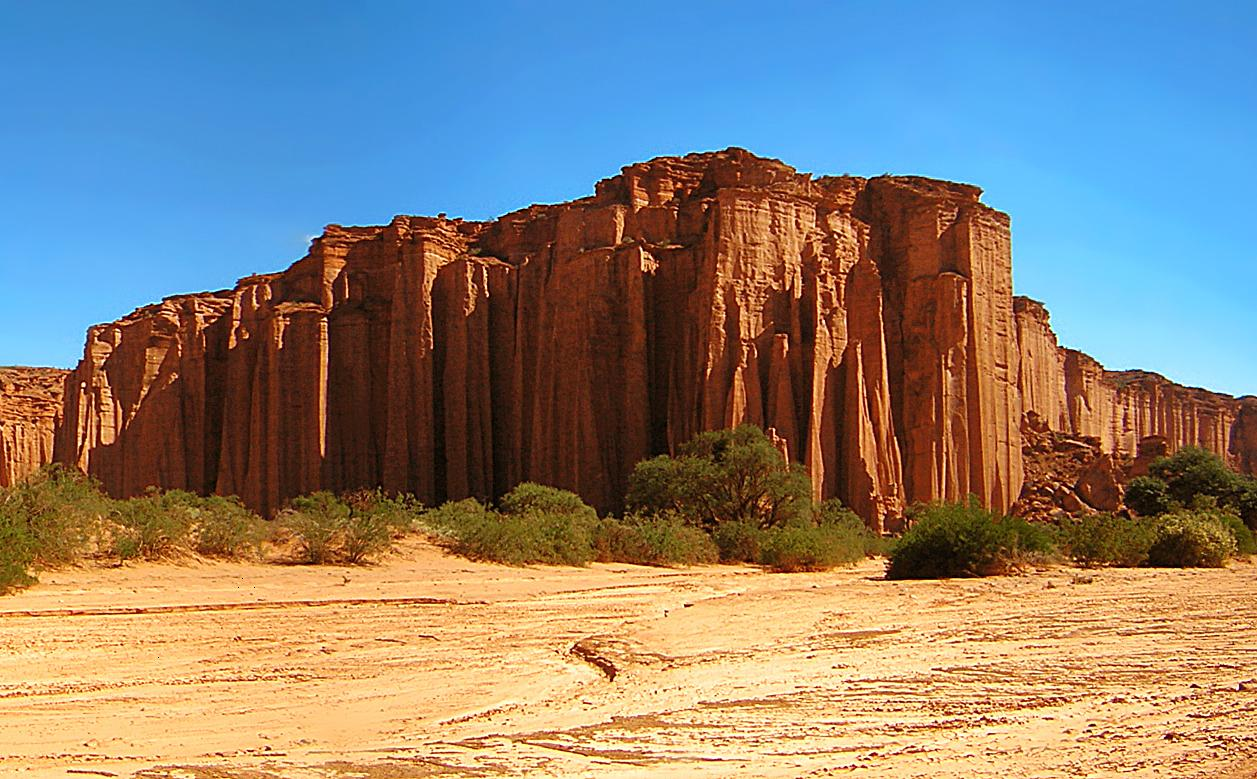
- Wall at the channel system

- Location within Argentina
- Location: La Rioja, Argentina
- Nearest city: Villa Unión
- Coordinates: 29°48′S 67°50′W
- Area: 2,150 km^{2} (830 sq mi)
- Established: 1997
- Governing body: Administración de Parques Nacionales

UNESCO World Heritage Site
- Official name: Ischigualasto and Talampaya Natural Parks
- Type: Natural
- Criteria: viii
- Designated: 2000 (24th session)
- Reference no.: 966
- Region: Latin America and the Caribbean

Talampaya National Park (Spanish: Parque Nacional Talampaya) is a national park located in the east/centre of La Rioja Province, Argentina. It was designated a provincial reserve in 1975, a national park in 1997, and a UNESCO World Heritage Site in 2000.

== Location ==
The park protects an area of the High Monte ecoregion. The park covers an area of 2,150 square kilometres (830 sq mi), at an altitude of 1,500 metres (4,921 ft) above mean sea level. Its purpose is to protect important archaeological and palaeontological sites found in the area. It has landscapes of great beauty, with flora and fauna typical of the mountain biome.

The park is in a basin between the Cerro Los Colorados to the west and the Sierra de Sañagasta to the east. The landscape is the result of erosion by water and wind in a desert climate, with large ranges in temperature - high heat by day and low temperature at night, with torrential rain in summer and strong wind in spring.

To the south, the park borders Ischigualasto Provincial Park, a provincial protected area in the north-east of Argentina's San Juan Province.

== Features ==
The park includes:

- The dry bed of the Talampaya River, where dinosaurs lived millions of years ago. Fossils, whilst not as interesting as those in the Ischigualasto park, have been found here;
- The Talampaya gorge and its rock formations with walls of the Talampaya Formation of up to 143 metres (469 ft) high, narrowing to 80 metres (262 ft) at one point;
- The remains of indigenous peoples' settlements, such as the petroglyphs of the Puerta del Cañón;
- A botanical garden of the local flora at the narrow point of the canyon;
- Regional fauna, including guanacos, hares, maras, foxes and condors.

== Gallery ==
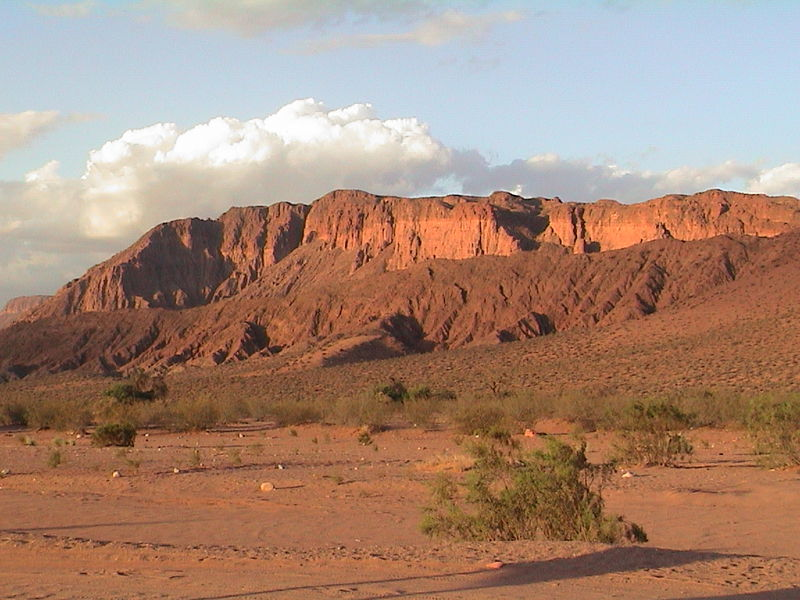
Parque Nacional de Talampaya

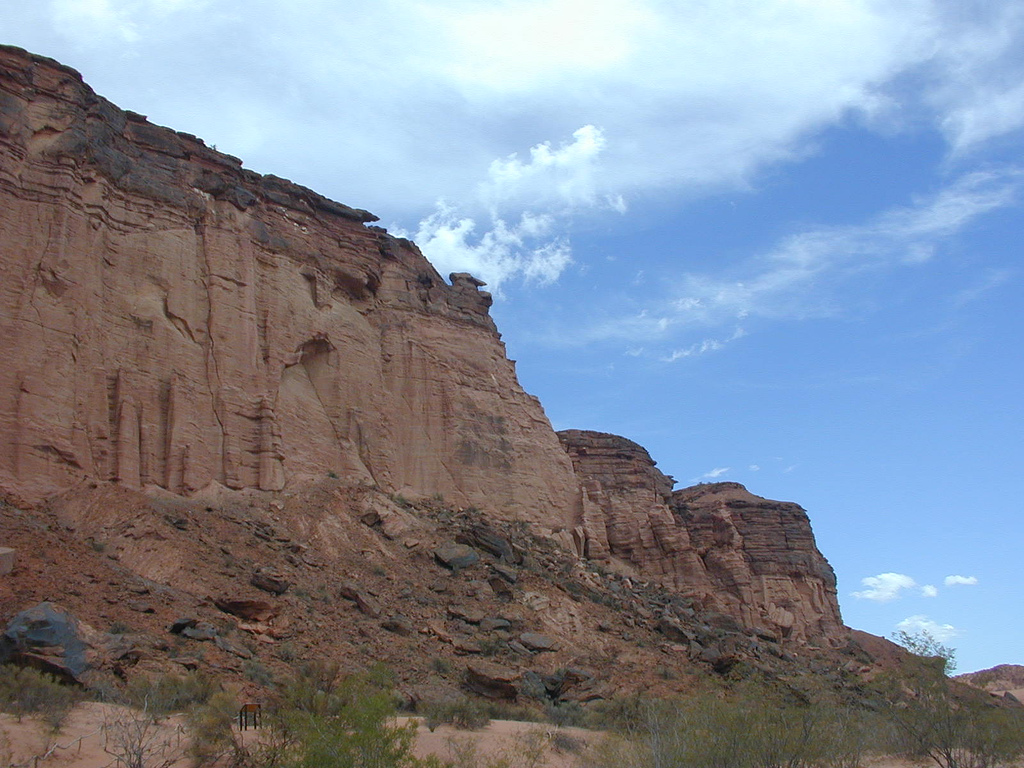
Talampaya canyon entrance

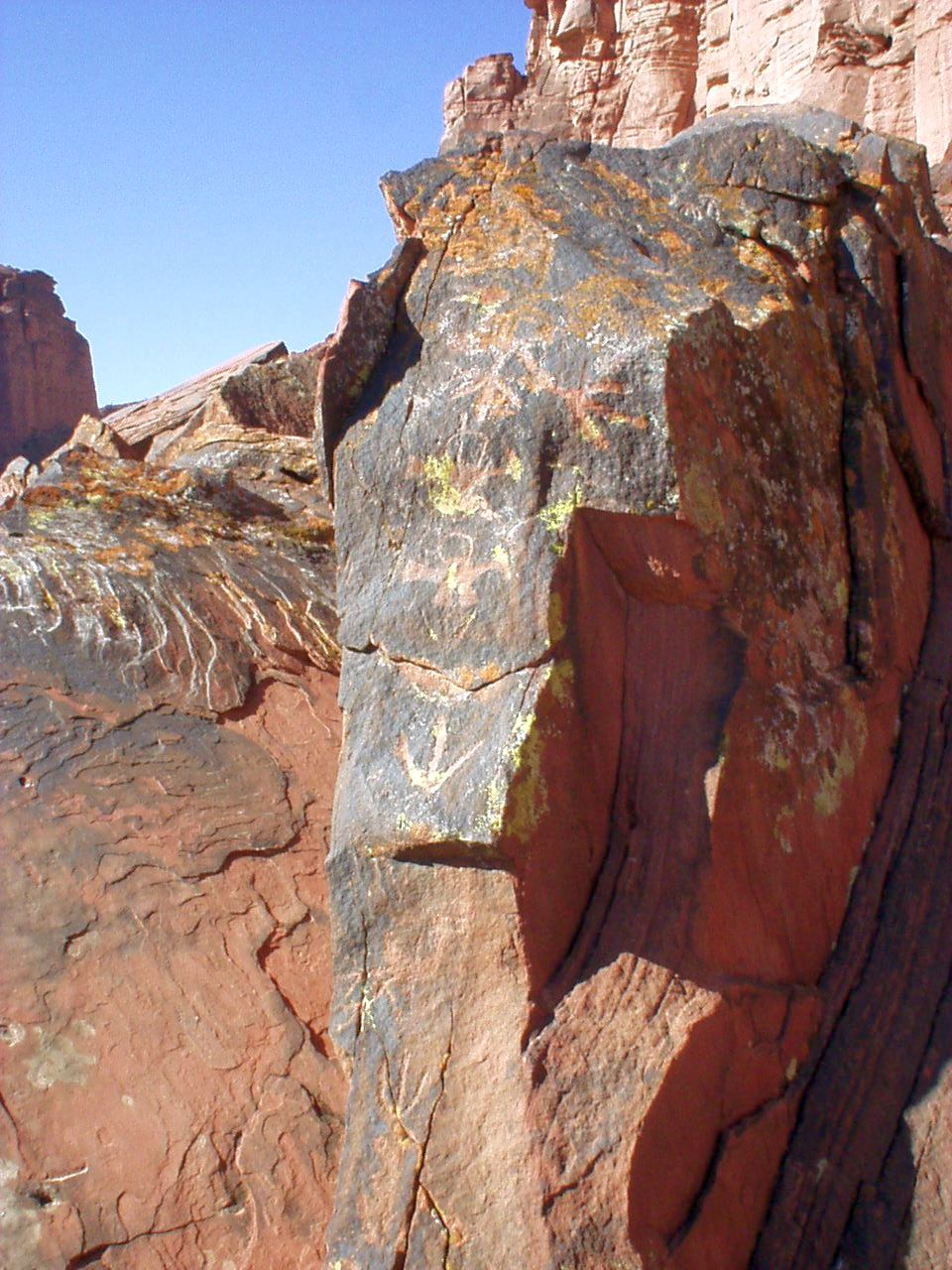
Petroglyphs

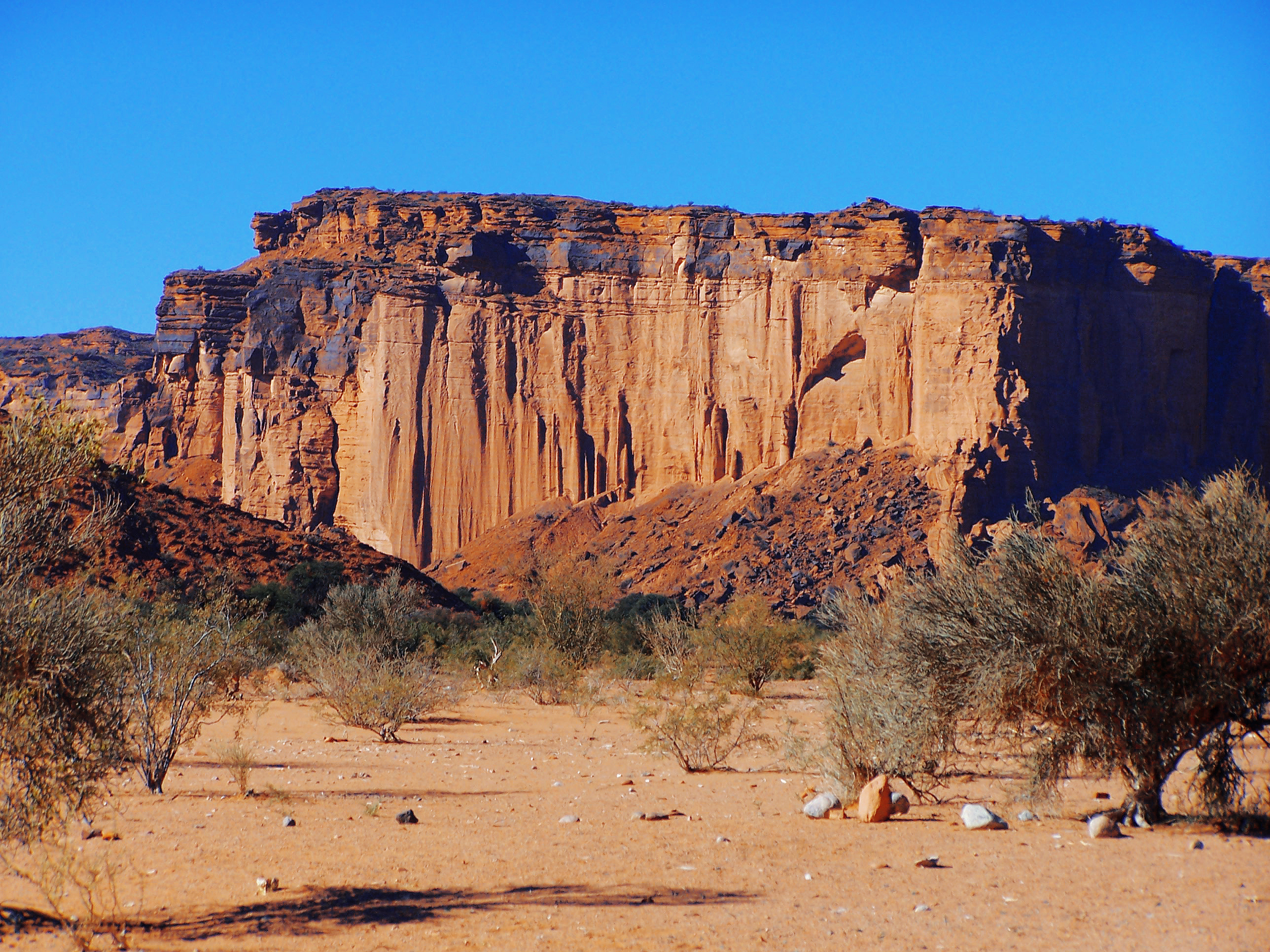
Parque Nacional Talampaya

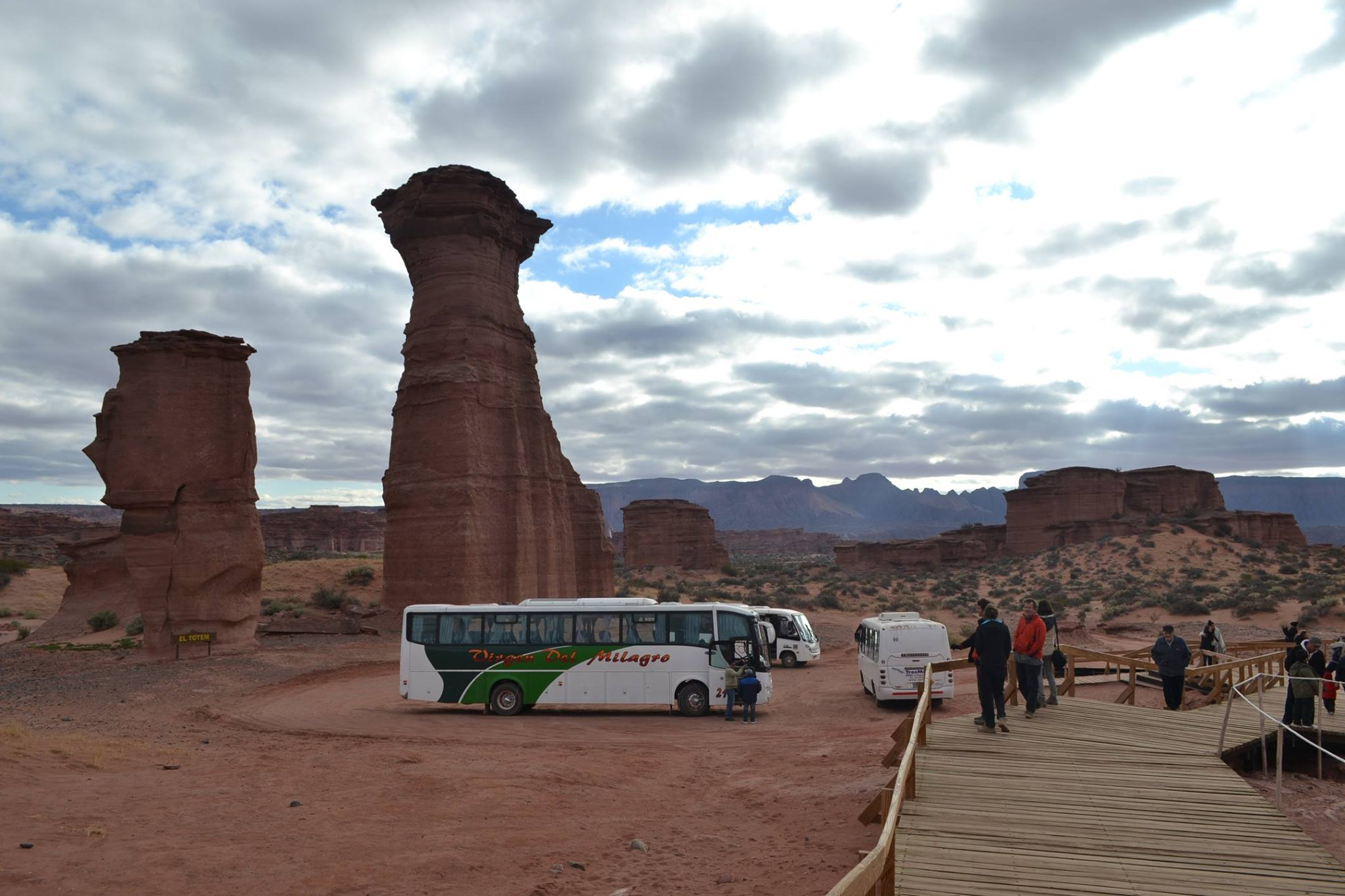
Tour buses at the park

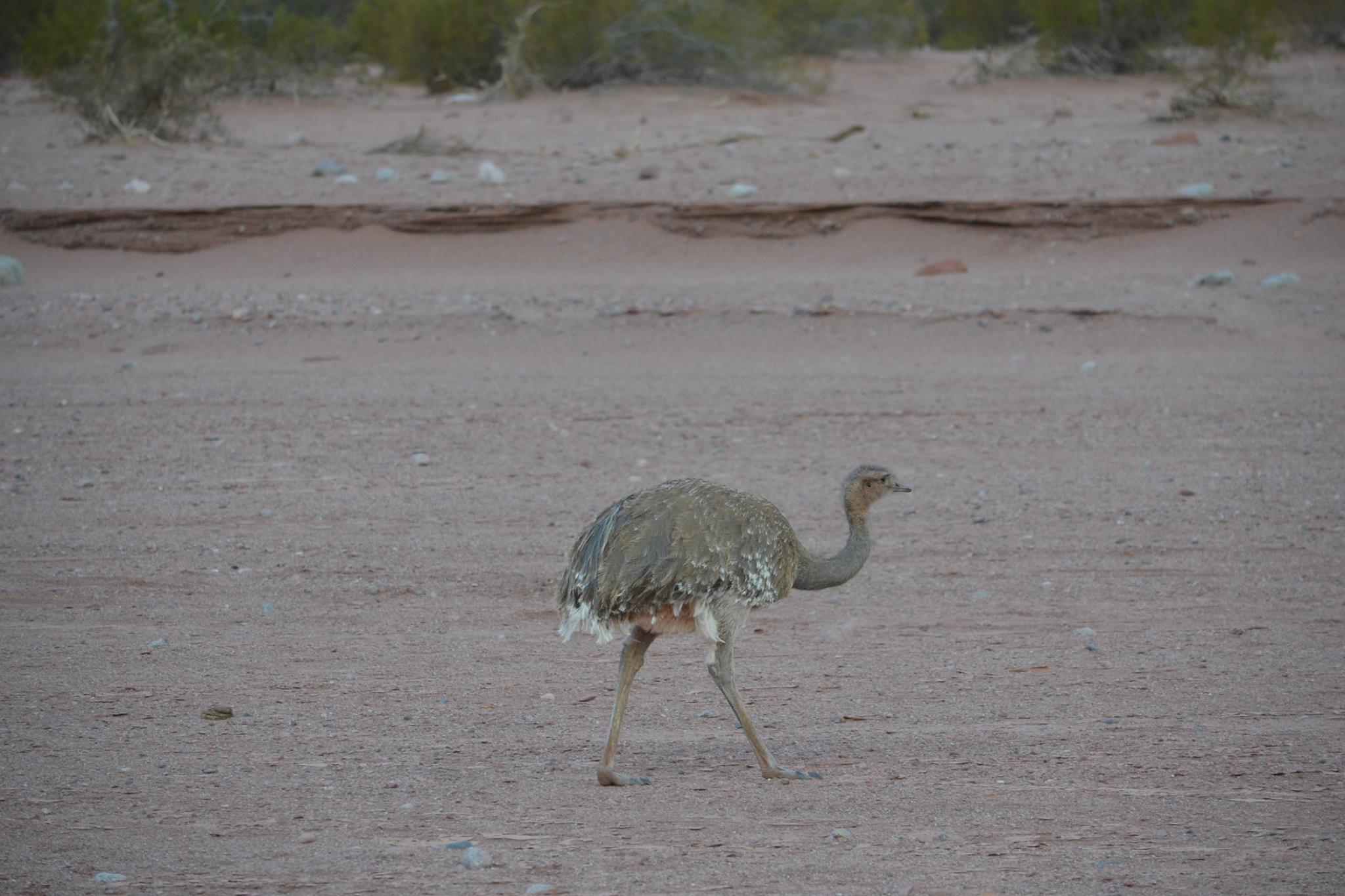
Rhea

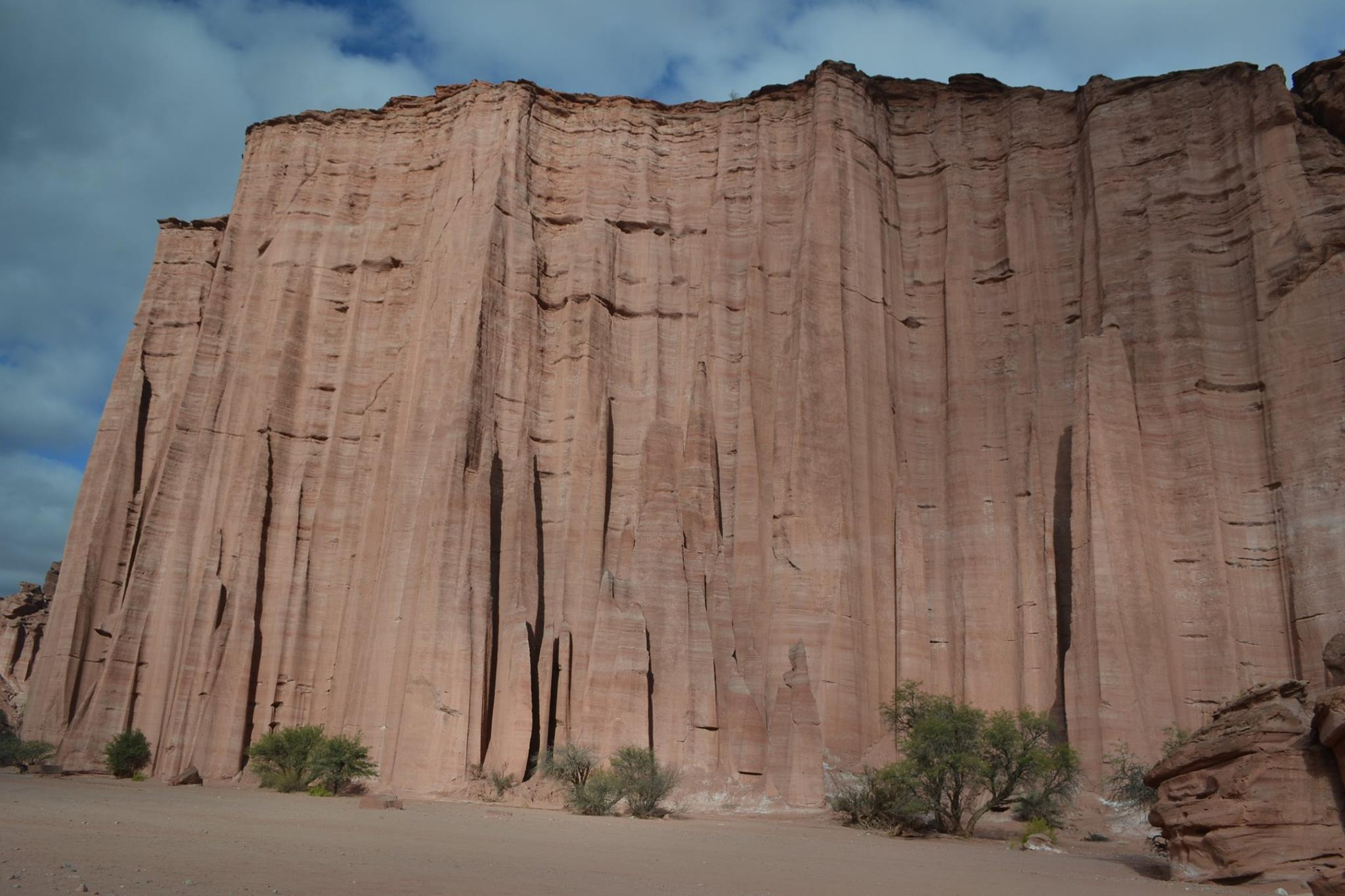
The wall
