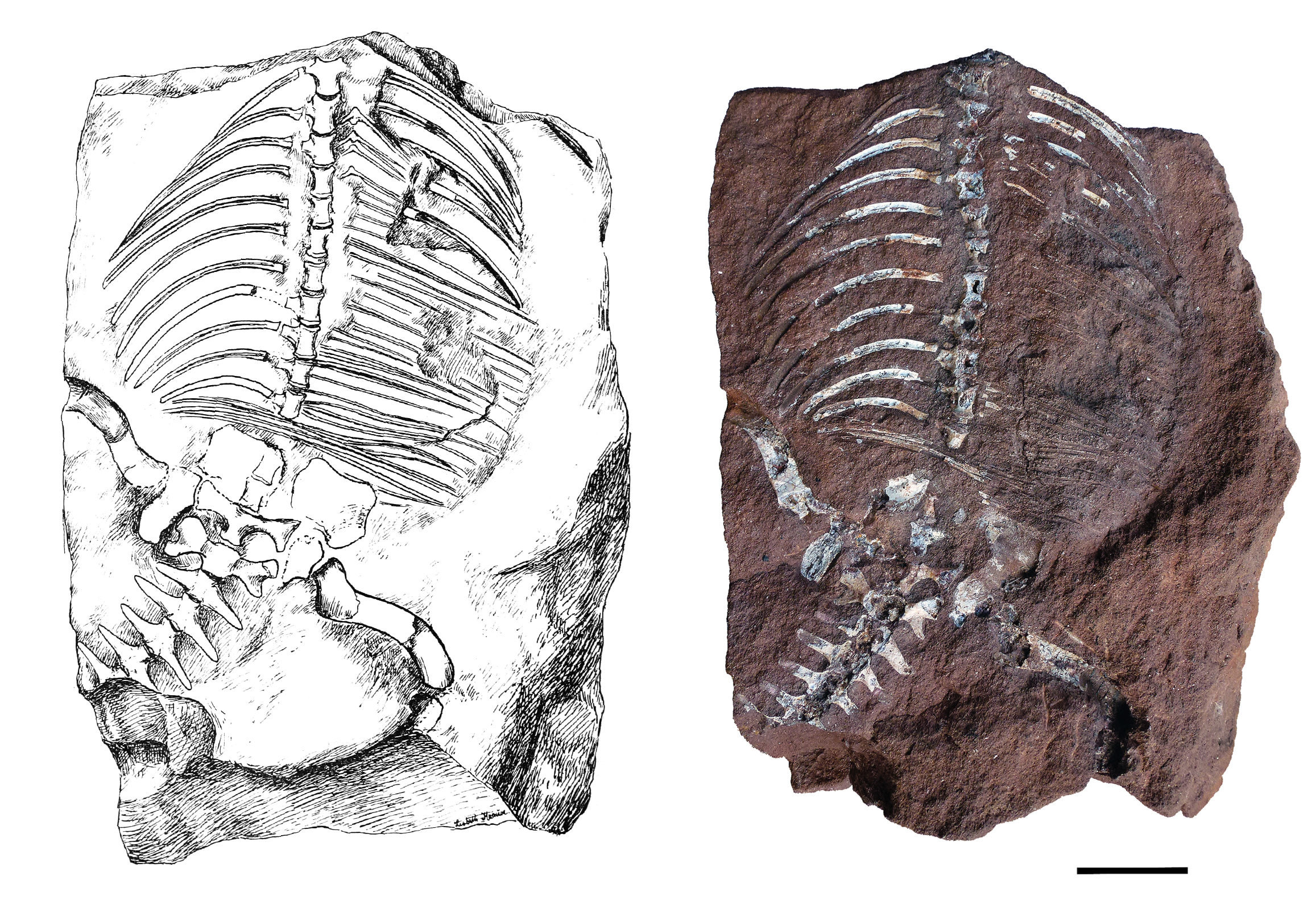
- Initial 1904 illustration (left) and modern photograph (right) of the E. triadicus holotype

Scientific classification
- Kingdom: Animalia
- Phylum: Chordata
- Class: Reptilia
- Clade: Archosauromorpha
- Clade: Crocopoda
- Order: †Rhynchosauria
- Family: †Rhynchosauridae
- Genus: †Eifelosaurus; Jaekel, 1904
- Species: †E. triadicus

Binomial name
- †Eifelosaurus triadicus Jaekel, 1904

= Eifelosaurus =

Eifelosaurus Temporal range: Middle Triassic, early Anisian

Genus of rhynchosaur reptiles

Eifelosaurus (lit. 'Eifel lizard') is an extinct genus of rhynchosaurian reptile known from the Middle Triassic (Anisian age) Röt Formation of Germany. The genus contains a single species, Eifelosaurus triadicus, known from a partial articulated skeleton including the torso, pelvis, and part of the legs and tail, preserved with the underside of the animal exposed. Eifelosaurus is a member of the family Rhynchosauridae, and indicates rhynchosaurs were already widely geographically distributed from Germany to South Africa early in their evolutionary history.

== History ==
Location of Oberbettingen, near the E. triadicus type locality

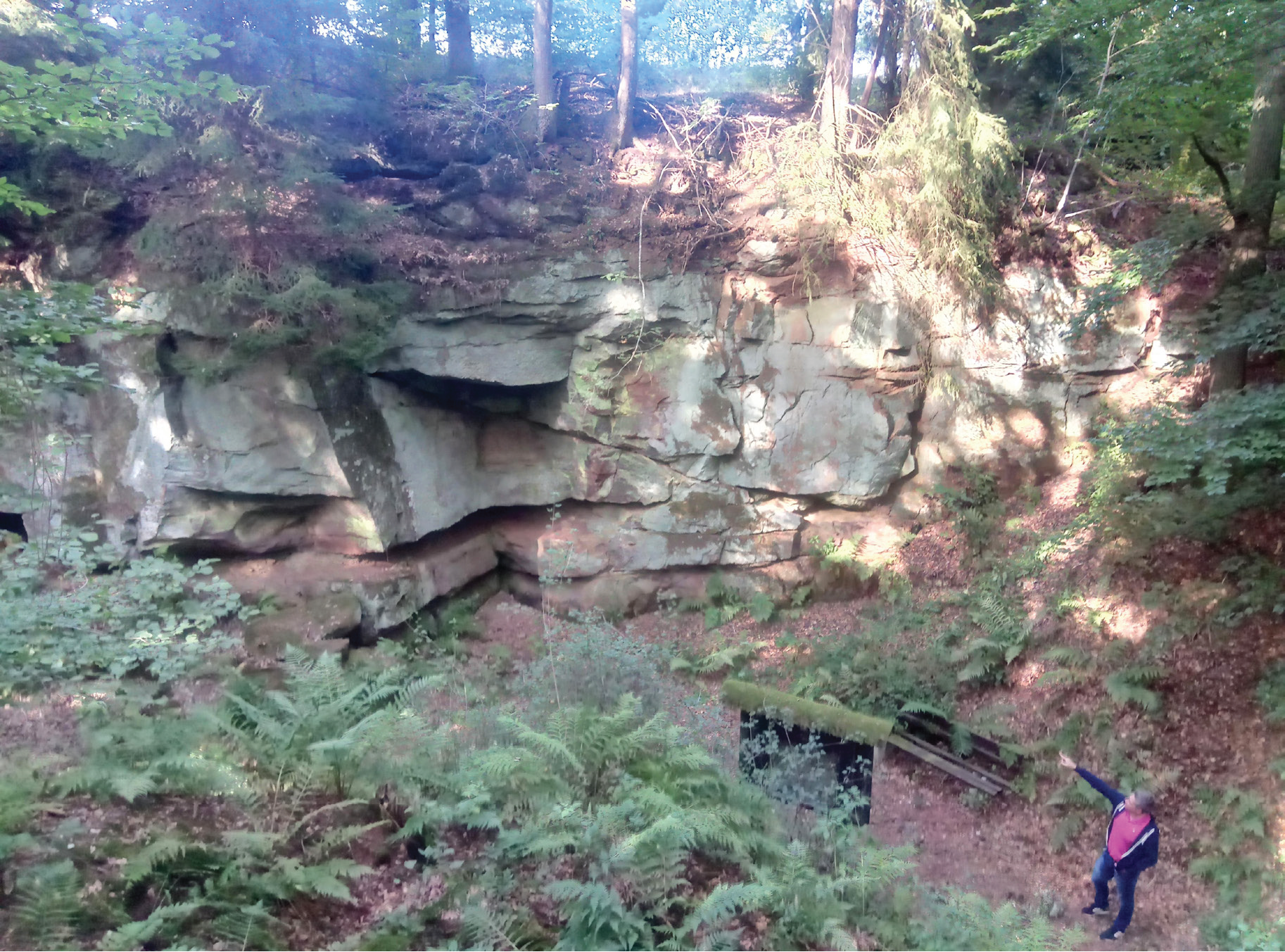
Buntsandstein quarry in Oberbettingen; possibly the E. triadicus type locality

At some point in 1903, quarrymen in Oberbettingen, Germany, discovered the partial skeleton of a fossil reptile embedded in dark sandstone. The quarrywork locality represents outcrops of the Röt Formation, part of the Upper Buntsandstein unit, which contains rocks dating to the Early–Middle Triassic. As the exact locality was never recorded, it remains unknown. Shortly thereafter, the specimen was obtained by Stefan Dohm, a local amateur fossil collector, who contacted German palaeontologist Otto Jaekel that autumn. Dohm loaned the specimen to Jaekel for study on the condition that it was only examined superficially, and no additional preparation was performed to remove excess matrix surrounding the skeleton. Upon observing the specimen, Jaekel noted that much of the preserved bone was shattered and could have been easily removed to reveal the impression left in the sediment underneath. While he refrained from doing this, he determined that this would be beneficial in better understanding the anatomy of the preserved vertebrae and pelvis. In June 1904, Jaekel published a brief description of the specimen, for which he had an illustration of the material produced. In this publication, regarding the illustration, he commented that he could not resist adding certain clarifying details as dotted lines for some broken skeletal elements. The specimen consists of a largely articulated—albeit incomplete—skeleton, preserved in ventral view (underside exposed), including most of the trunk (at least fifteen dorsal vertebrae in addition to ribs and gastralia), the sacrum (two sacral vertebrae), five caudal (tail) vertebrae, most of the pelvis, part of both femora, and the left tibia. The skull, cervical (neck) vertebrae, pectoral girdle, forelimbs, feet, and tip of the tail are not preserved. While the skeleton is flattened and broken in several regions, most of the individual bones are not crushed or distorted.

Jaekel concluded that this specimen represented a new taxon due to its lizardlike morphology and the fact that all other lizard fossils were known from younger (more recent) rock layers. As such, he proposed the new binomial name Eifelosaurus triadicus based on it, stating his desire that future preparation would reveal more of the animal's anatomy, thus elucidating its relationships with other reptiles. In 1929, Friedrich von Huene argued that Eifelosaurus was not a lizard, but a member of the Rhynchosauria. At some point following its description by Jaekel, the Eifelosaurus type specimen disappeared. In 1969, French palaeontologist Bernard Krebs claimed it was still part of Dohm's fossil collection in Gerolstein, which had been destroyed in 1944 when an allied air raid on the town resulted in much of its destruction during World War II. Fortunately, the specimen had been relocated some time prior, likely after Dohm's death in 1924, and added to the collections of the Steinmann Institute for Geology, Mineralogy, and Paleontology, part of the University of Bonn. It is now accessioned at the Goldfuß Museum at the University of Bonn as specimen IGPB JAEKEL-1.

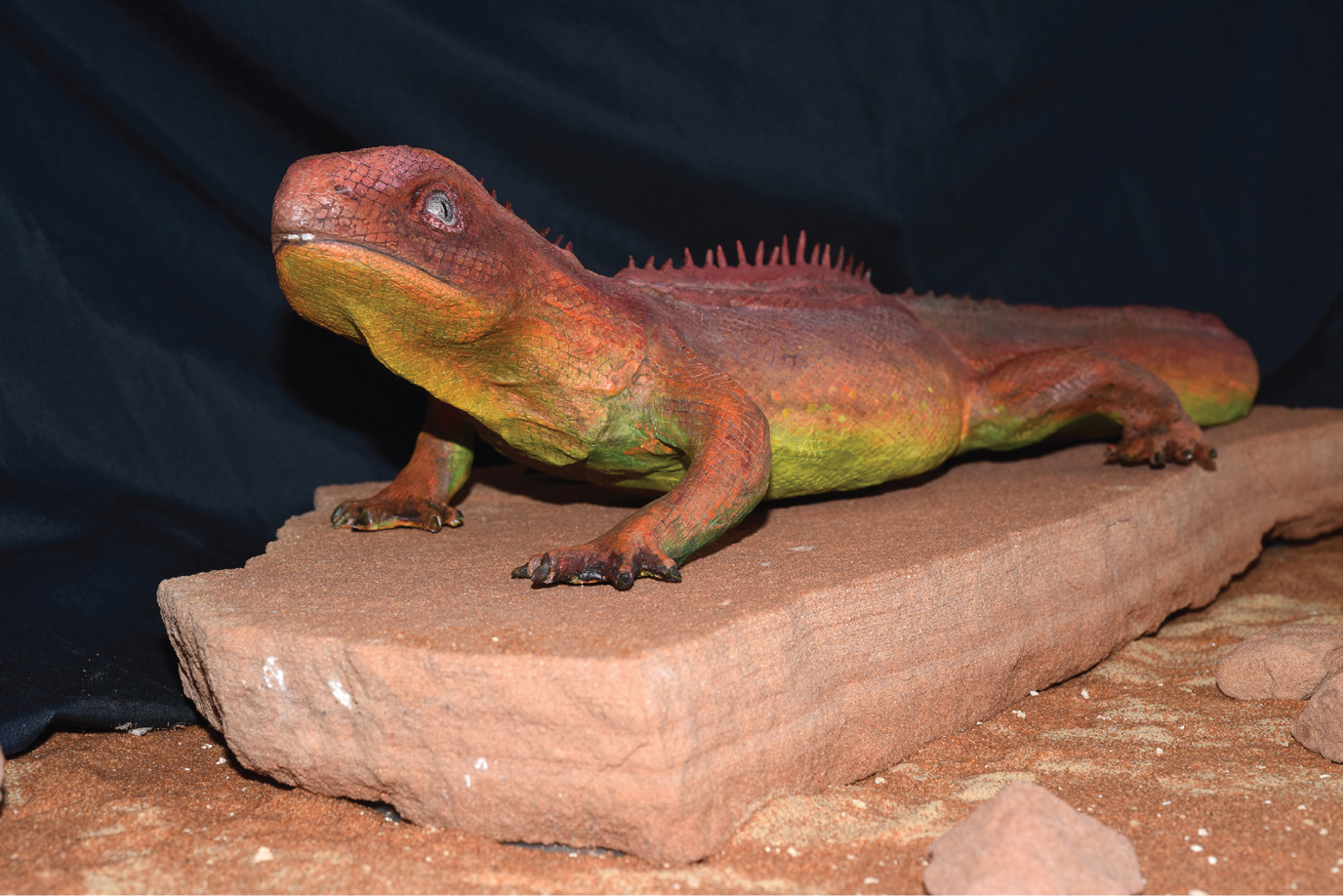
"Betti", an antiquated model of Eifelosaurus as a tuatara-like animal (Natural History Museum in Gerolstein)

In a 1984 review of the fossils of Buntsandstein, Detlef Mader claimed that the skeleton of Eifelosaurus is strikingly similar to that of the extant tuatara (Sphenodon punctatus). The tuatatara is part of the larger clade Rhynchocephalia, which is unrelated and only superficially similar to Rhynchosauria. Mader proposed that the presence of Eifelosaurus in the Triassic supported the existence of Sphenodon as a 'living fossil' due to its apparent similarities. In 1994, Martin Sander and Carole T. Gee more correctly asserted the rhynchosaurian affinities of Eifelosaurus in a subsequent updated description of the region's fossils. Eifelosaurus was not discussed in depth in most research papers in the following years. Butler et al. (2015) and Ezcurra et al. (2016) mentioned the taxon in passing as an "overlooked reptile" that had been "occasionally identified as a rhynchosaur", with both acknowledging that further research was needed on the taxon to better understand its affinities.

In 2022, Hans-Dieter Sues, Martín D. Ezcurra, and Rainer R. Schoch published the first detailed analysis of Eifelosaurus triadicus since its description in 1904. Based on rigorous anatomical observations and comparisons, the researchers concluded that, like previous authors had suggested, Eifelosaurus is a member of the Rhynchosauria. They further emphasized its significance due to its older age in comparison to other members of this clade; while the oldest and basalmost rhynchosaurs are known from South Africa, Eifelosaurus is similar in age to some of them, and is the oldest European rhynchosaur. This indicates that the Rhynchosauria had already achieved a wide paleolatitudinal distribution early in the clade's evolution. Sues and colleagues recognized that the fragmentary nature of the E. triadicus holotype restricts important comparisons with other rhynchosaurs. While it does bear any autapomorphies (distinct derived traits), the specimen does show a distinct combination of traits that distinguish it from all other taxa.

== Description ==
At around 60% complete, the holotype of Eifelosaurus measures around 20 centimetres (7.9 in), and estimates have suggested a total body length in life of around 50–60 cm (20–24 in). As a rhynchosaur, it likely would have been an herbivore with a distinctive protruding beak-like structure.

At least 15 dorsal (back) vertebrae are preserved, although it likely had 17 or 18, the number seen in many early archosauromorphs, including at least some rhynchosaurs. The vertebrae are amphicoelous, with a slight constriction in the middle, and they lack a keel on the bottom. All of the vertebral centrum lengths are effectively identical. The vertebrae bear prominent transverse processes, consistent with archosauromorphs but distinct from lepidosauromorphs (including rhynchocephalians). No intercentra are present, more similar to rhynchosaurids (i.e., Rhynchosaurus, Stenaulorhynchus, hyperodapedontines) than non-rhynchosaurid rhynchosaurs and rhynchocephalians. The dorsal ribs are transversely wide, giving Eifelosaurus a broad, barrel-shaped trunk. Most of the gastralia are preserved on the left side of the specimen, forming a 'gastral basket' that would have covered the trunk's entire ventral surface in life. The femur of Eifelosaurus is proportionately more robust than earlier and more basal rhynchosaurs (i.e., Noteosuchus, Mesosuchus, Howesia, and Rhynchosaurus).

== Classification ==
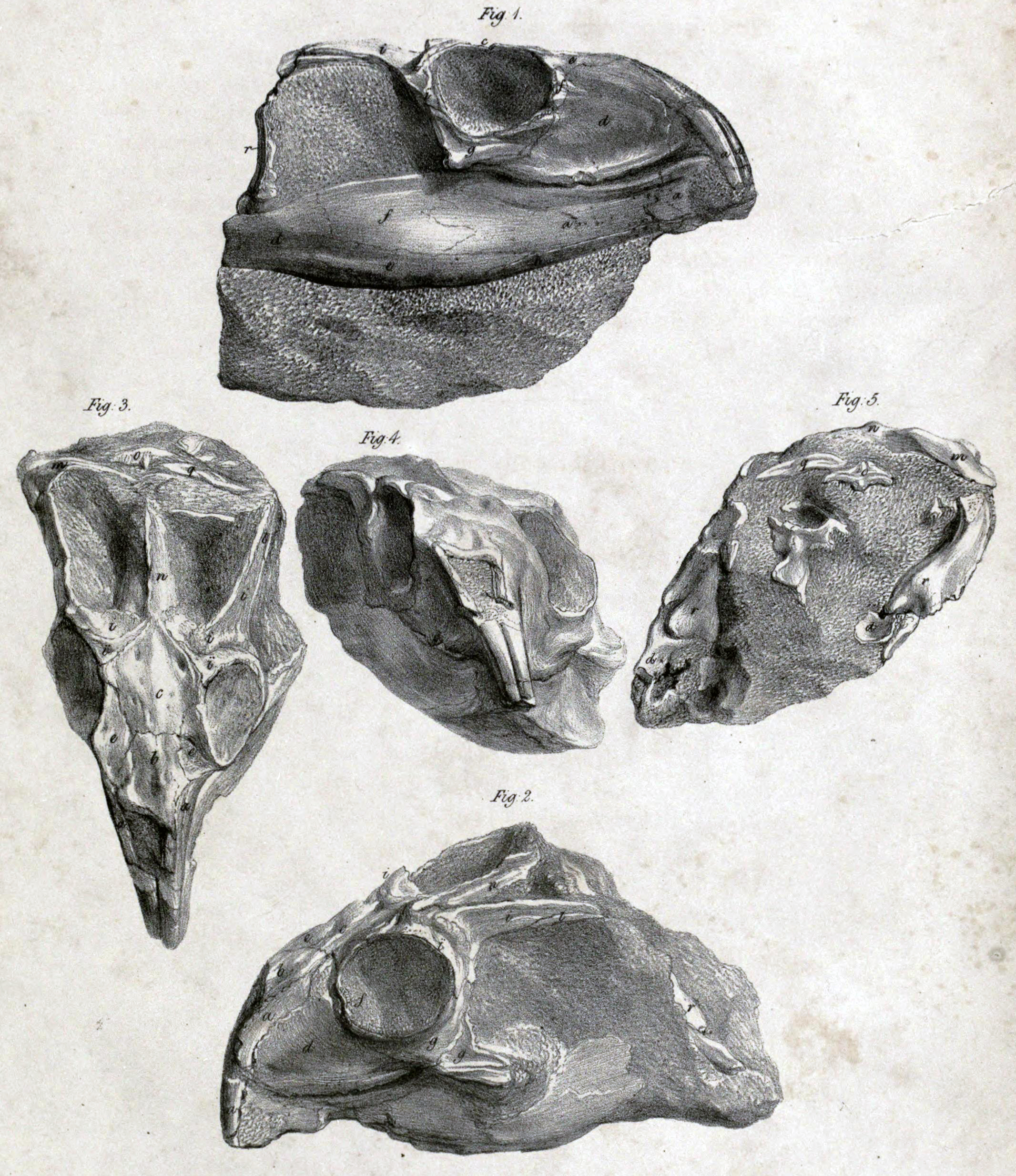
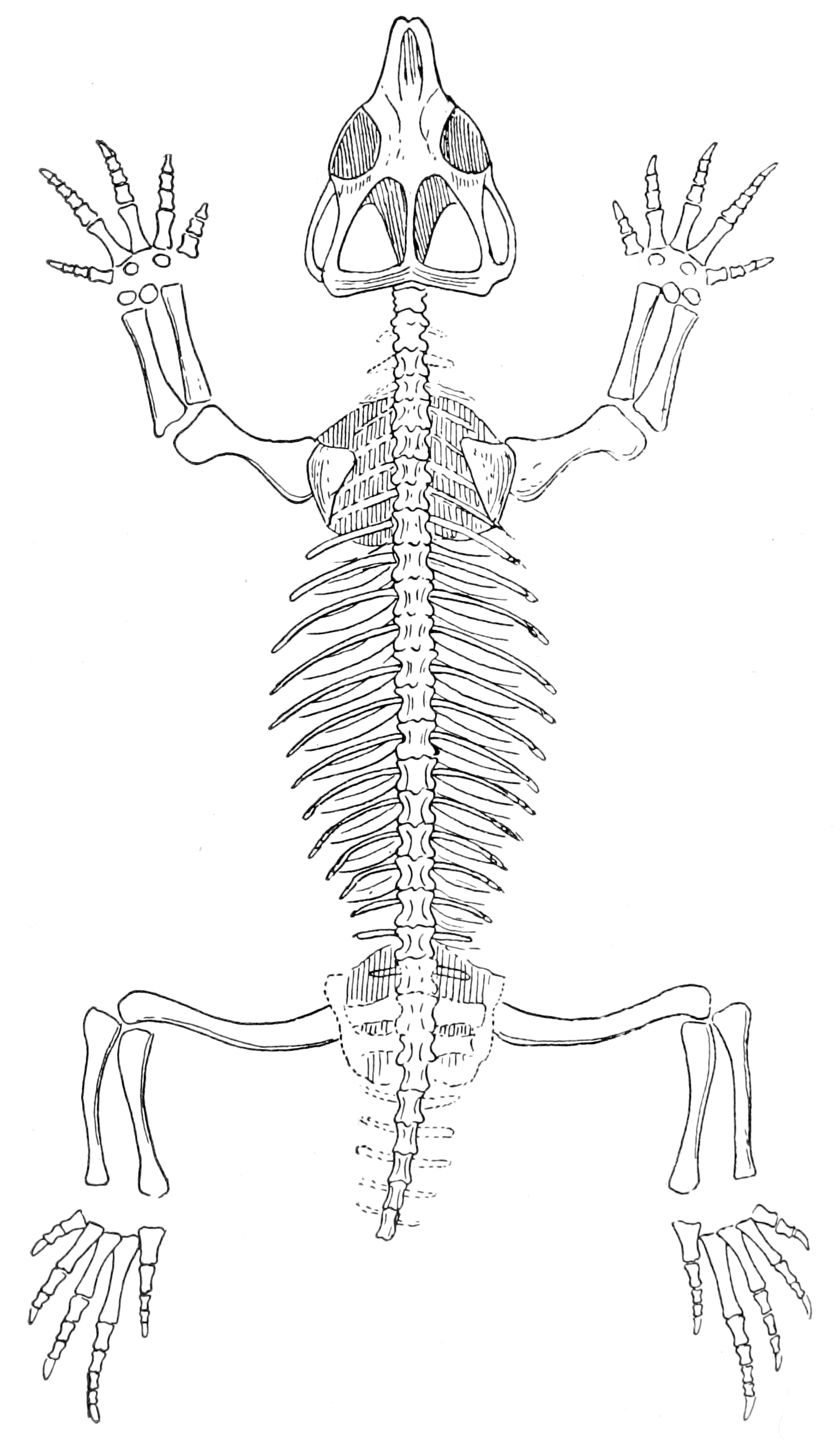
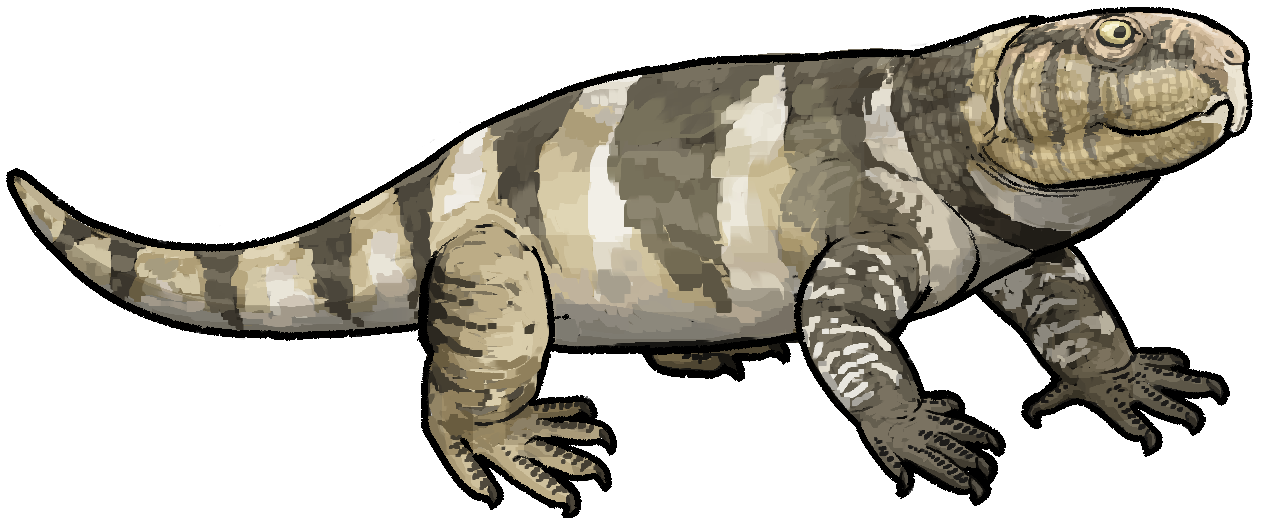
The closely related Rhynchosaurus articeps: skull (top left), reconstructed skeleton seen from above (top right), and speculative life restoration (bottom)

To determine the relationships and affinities of Eifelosaurus, Sues and colleagues (2022) included it in an updated version of the phylogenetic matrix published by Ezcurra et al. (2021). This analysis consistently recovered Eifelosaurus as a member of the Rhynchosauria, a clade within Archosauromorpha. More specifically, it was recovered as an early member of the family Rhynchosauridae, diverging after Rhynchosaurus articeps but before the clade comprising Stenaulorhynchinae and hyperodapedontine-line rhynchosaurids. Comparable results were recovered by Spiekman et al. (2026) in their reassessment of the more basal rhynchosaur Howesia. These results are displayed in the cladogram below:

- †Rhynchosauria
  - - Mesosuchus browni
    - Noteosuchus colletti
  - - Howesia browni
    - Rhynchosauridae
      - Rhynchosaurus articeps
      - - Eifelosaurus triadicus
        - - Stenaulorhynchinae
            ⊞
            - Ammorhynchus navajoi
            - - Mesodapedon kuttyi
              - - Brasinorhynchus mariantensis
                - Stenaulorhynchus stockleyi
            ⊟
          - - Bentonyx sidensis
            - - Langeronyx brodiei
              - - Fodonyx spenceri
                - Hyperodapedontinae
                  ⊞
                  - Isalorhynchus genovefae
                  - - Oryctorhynchus bairdi
                    - - - Hyperodapedon mariensis
                        - Hyperodapedon sanjuanensis
                      - - - Hyperodapedon huenei
                          - Teyumbaita sulcognathus
                        - - Hyperodapedon gordoni
                          - Hyperodapedon huxleyi
                  ⊟

Sues et al. (2022) emphasized that many phylogenetically significant characters for rhynchosaurs are focused on the skull and lower leg, regions that are not preserved in the only known Eifelosaurus specimen. Since many characters could not be scored for this taxon in their phylogenetic matrix, only one additional step was required in the analysis to shift Eifelosaurus into various other positions within Rhynchosauria, such as in a position sister to Rhynchosauridae (diverging before Rhynchosaurus), diverging before Eohyosaurus (a possible junior synonym of Howesia), any other position as a non-hyperodapedontine rhynchosaurid, or as the sister group to Rhynchosauria + all other crownward archosauromorphs. The researchers concluded that Eifelosaurus should most parsimoniously be regarded as a rhynchosaurid rhynchosaur, but cautioned that statistical support for this placement was poor due to the limited amount of observable phylogenetically significant characters.

== Palaeoenvironment ==
Eifelosaurus is known from the Röt Formation of Germany, which dates to the early Anisian age of the beginning of the mid-Triassic period. Other reptile fossils from the formation include those of Cymatosaurus (a sauropterygian), Sclerosaurus (a procolophonid), Amotosaurus (a tanystropheid), and unnamed ctenosauriscid pseudosuchians.
