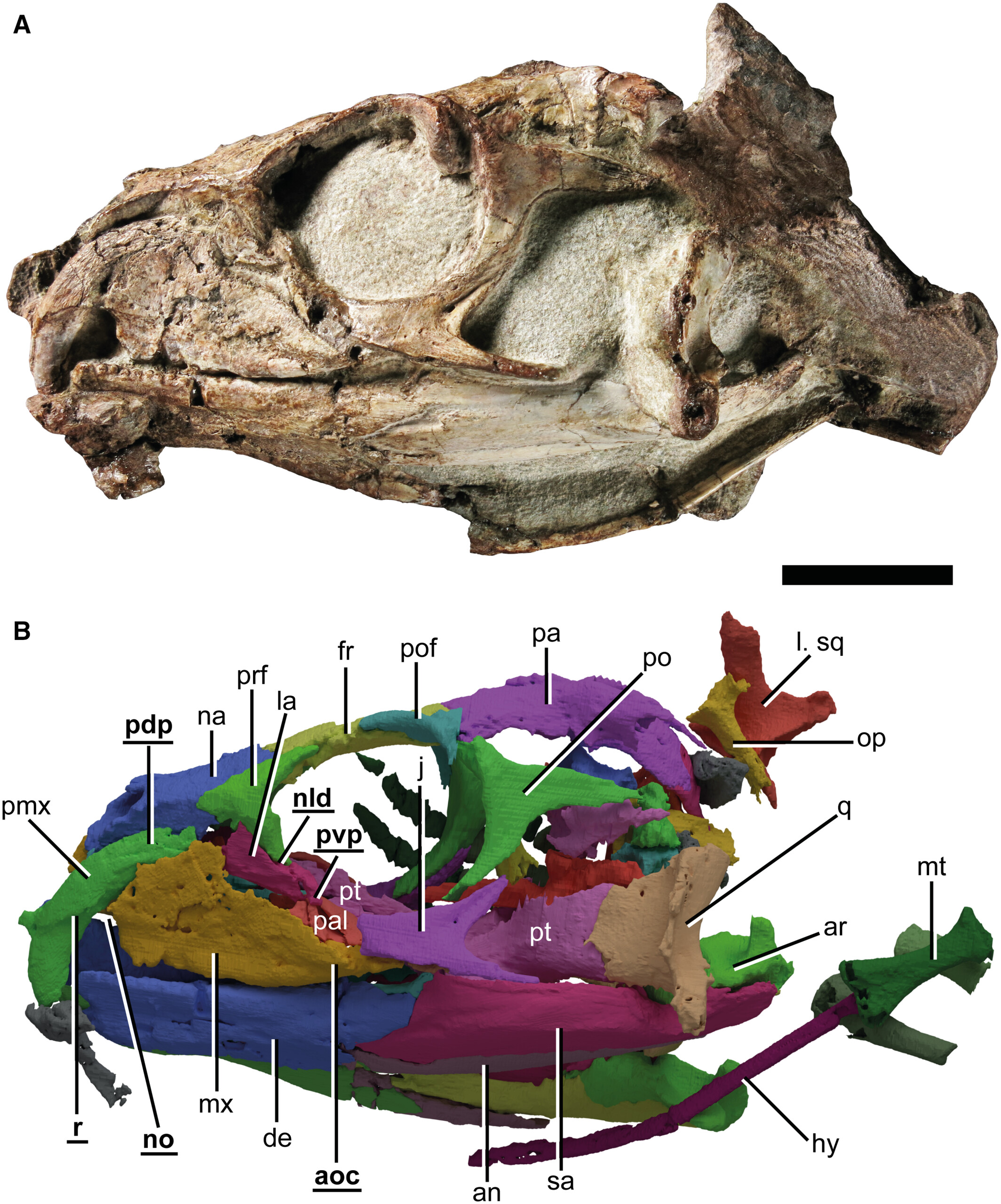
- Photograph (top) and μCT rendering (bottom) of SAM-PK-K10180, a skull of H. browni

Scientific classification
- Kingdom: Animalia
- Phylum: Chordata
- Class: Reptilia
- Order: †Rhynchosauria
- Genus: †Howesia; Broom, 1905

Species
- †H. browni Broom, 1905 (type)

= Howesia =

Howesia Temporal range: Early–Middle Triassic, Olenekian–early Anisian

Extinct genus of reptile

Howesia is an extinct genus of basal rhynchosaur from early Middle Triassic (early Anisian stage) deposits of Eastern Cape, South Africa. It is known from the holotype. SAM-PK-5884 (a partial skeleton with palate and partial lower jaws), two paratypes (SAM-PK-5885 and SAM-PK-5886). The known fossils were found in the Burgersdorp Formation of the middle deposits of the Beaufort Group (Karoo Basin) and referred to Subzone B of the Cynognathus Assemblage Zone. The genus contains a single species, Howesia browni, named by Robert Broom in 1905, after Alfred Brown. The contemporary Eohyosaurus wolvaardti (holotype SAM-PK-K10159) has been suggested to be a junior synonym of H. browni based on shared anatomical traits not recognized when the former was named in 2015.

== Classification ==
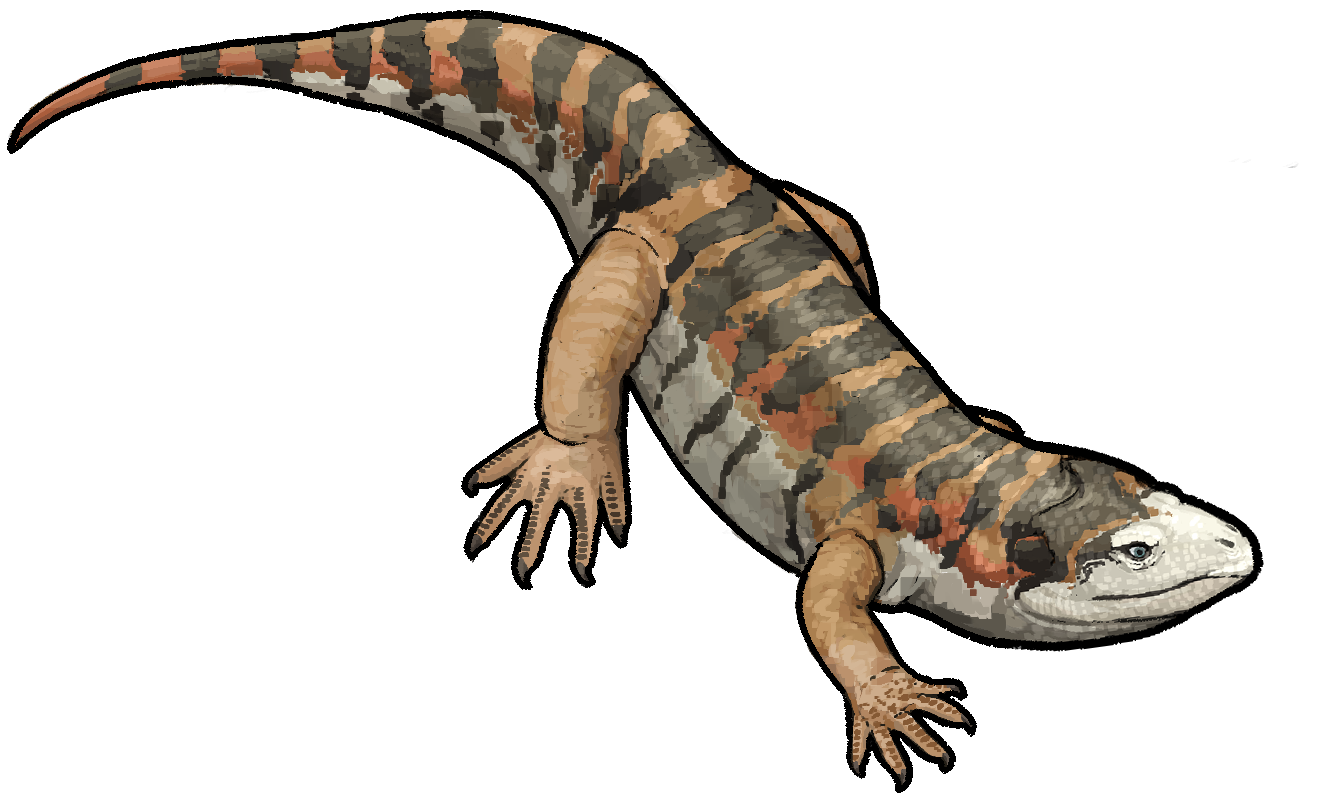
Life restoration

The placement of Howesia as a basal member of the Rhynchosauria is shown in the cladogram below, following the phylogenetic results of Spiekman et al. (2026).

- †Rhynchosauria
  - - Mesosuchus browni
    - Noteosuchus colletti
  - - Howesia browni
    - Rhynchosauridae
      - Rhynchosaurus articeps
      - - Eifelosaurus triadicus
        - - Stenaulorhynchinae
            ⊞
            - Ammorhynchus navajoi
            - - Mesodapedon kuttyi
              - - Brasinorhynchus mariantensis
                - Stenaulorhynchus stockleyi
            ⊟
          - - Bentonyx sidensis
            - - Langeronyx brodiei
              - - Fodonyx spenceri
                - Hyperodapedontinae
                  ⊞
                  - Isalorhynchus genovefae
                  - - Oryctorhynchus bairdi
                    - - - Hyperodapedon mariensis
                        - Hyperodapedon sanjuanensis
                      - - - Hyperodapedon huenei
                          - Teyumbaita sulcognathus
                        - - Hyperodapedon gordoni
                          - Hyperodapedon huxleyi
                  ⊟
