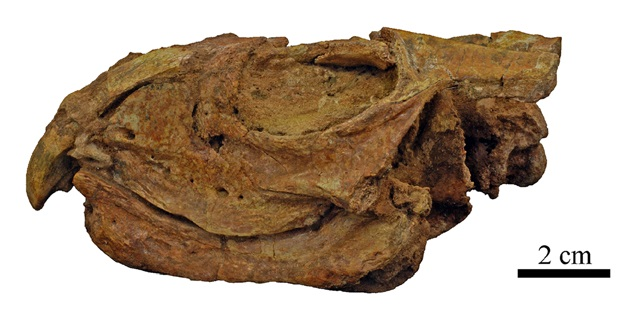
- Skull

Scientific classification
- Kingdom: Animalia
- Phylum: Chordata
- Class: Reptilia
- Order: †Rhynchosauria
- Family: †Hyperodapedontidae
- Genus: †Bentonyx; Langer et al., 2010

Species
- †B. sidensis Langer et al., 2010 (type)

= Bentonyx =

Bentonyx Temporal range: Middle Triassic, Anisian

Extinct genus of reptiles

Bentonyx (meaning "Bentons's claw") is an extinct genus of rhynchosaur from the middle Triassic epoch of Devon in England. Its fossil, a well preserved skull, BRSUG 27200, was discovered in Otter Sandstone Formation (late Anisian age) and was first assigned to Rhynchosaurus spenceri, that is known from 25 specimens. This species was reassigned to its own genus, Fodonyx, that was first described by David W. E. Hone and Michael Benton in 2008. More recently, this skull was reassigned to this genus by Max C. Langer, Felipe C. Montefeltro, David E. Hone, Robin Whatley and Cesar L. Schultz in 2010 and the type species is Bentonyx sidensis.

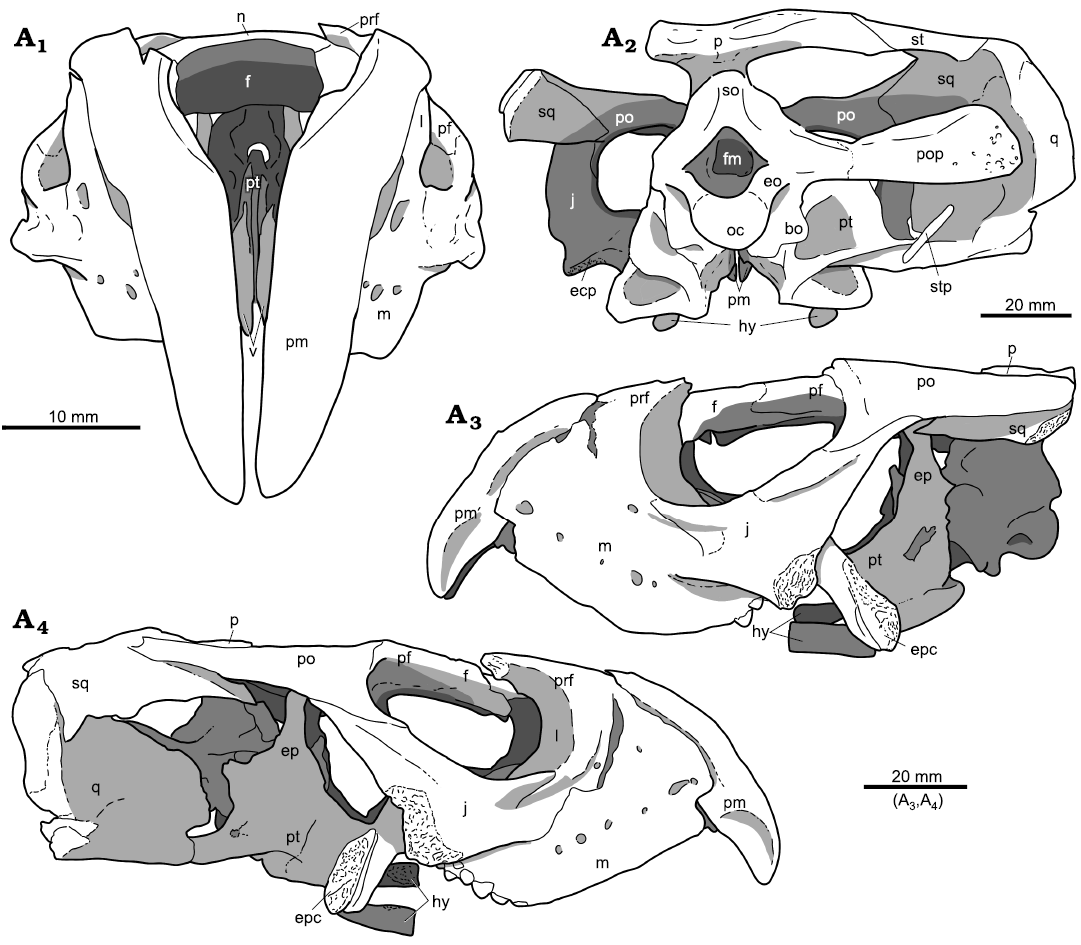
Bentonyx skull drawings in front-on (A1/top left), rear-on (A2/top right), and side on (A3+A4)

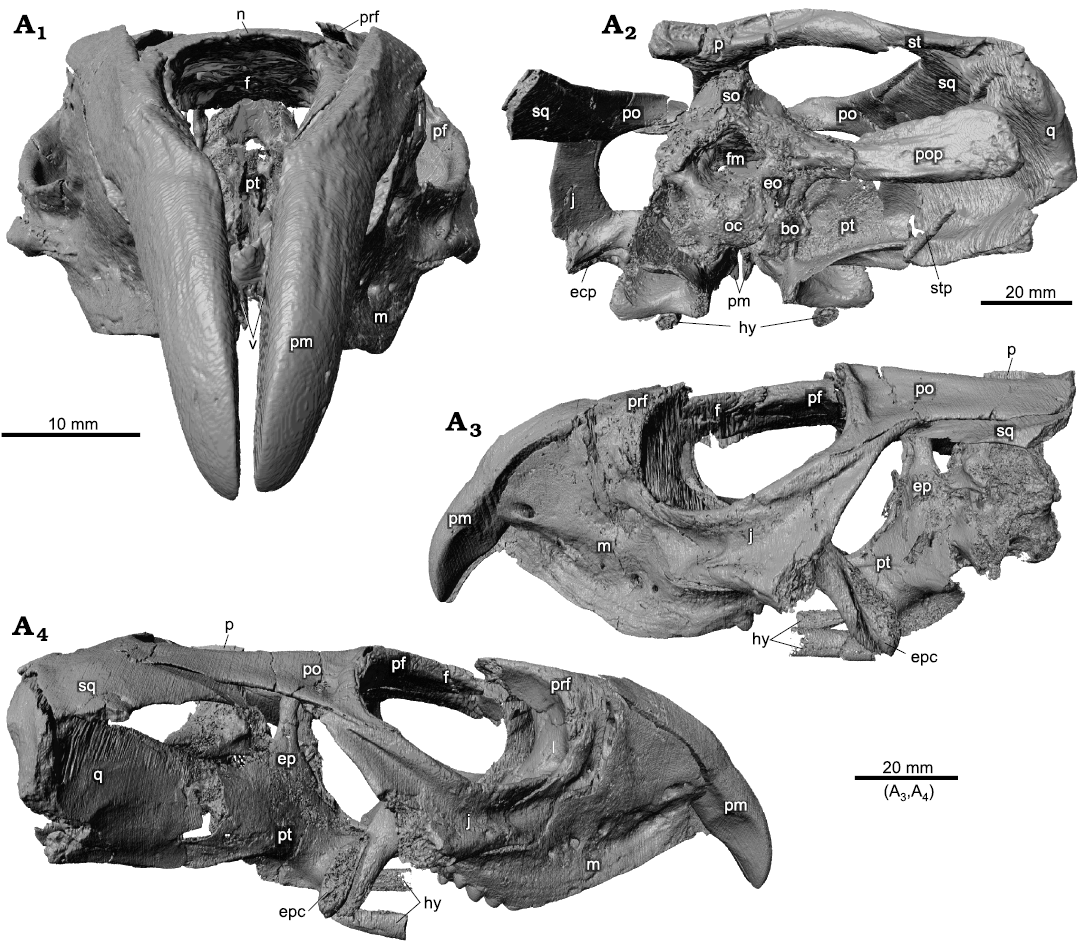
Bentonyx skull scan in front-on (A1/top left), rear-on (A2/top right), and side on (A3+A4)

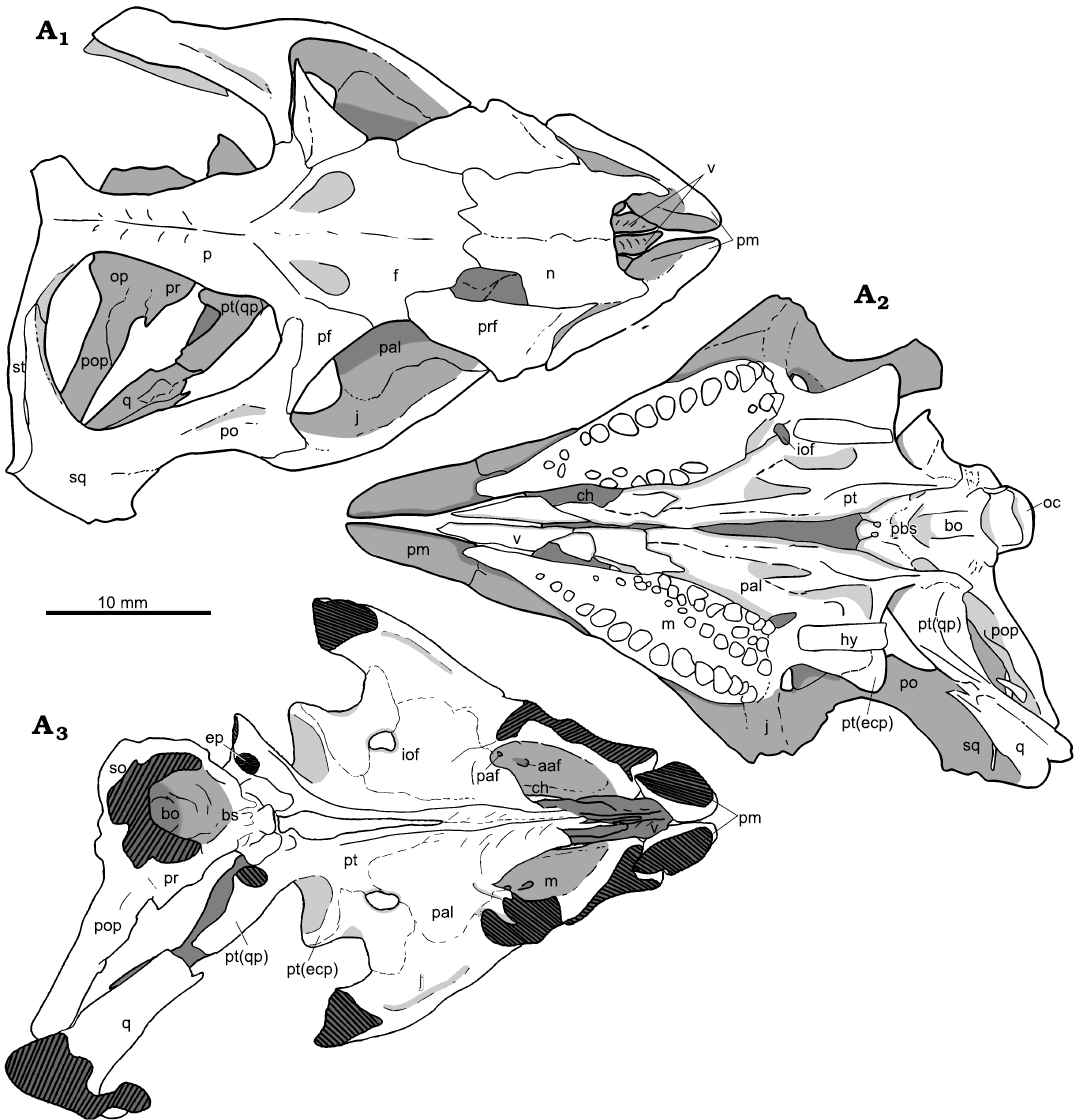
Bentonyx skull drawing in top down (A1/top), from below (A2/Middle) and palatal view without maxilla (A3/bottom)

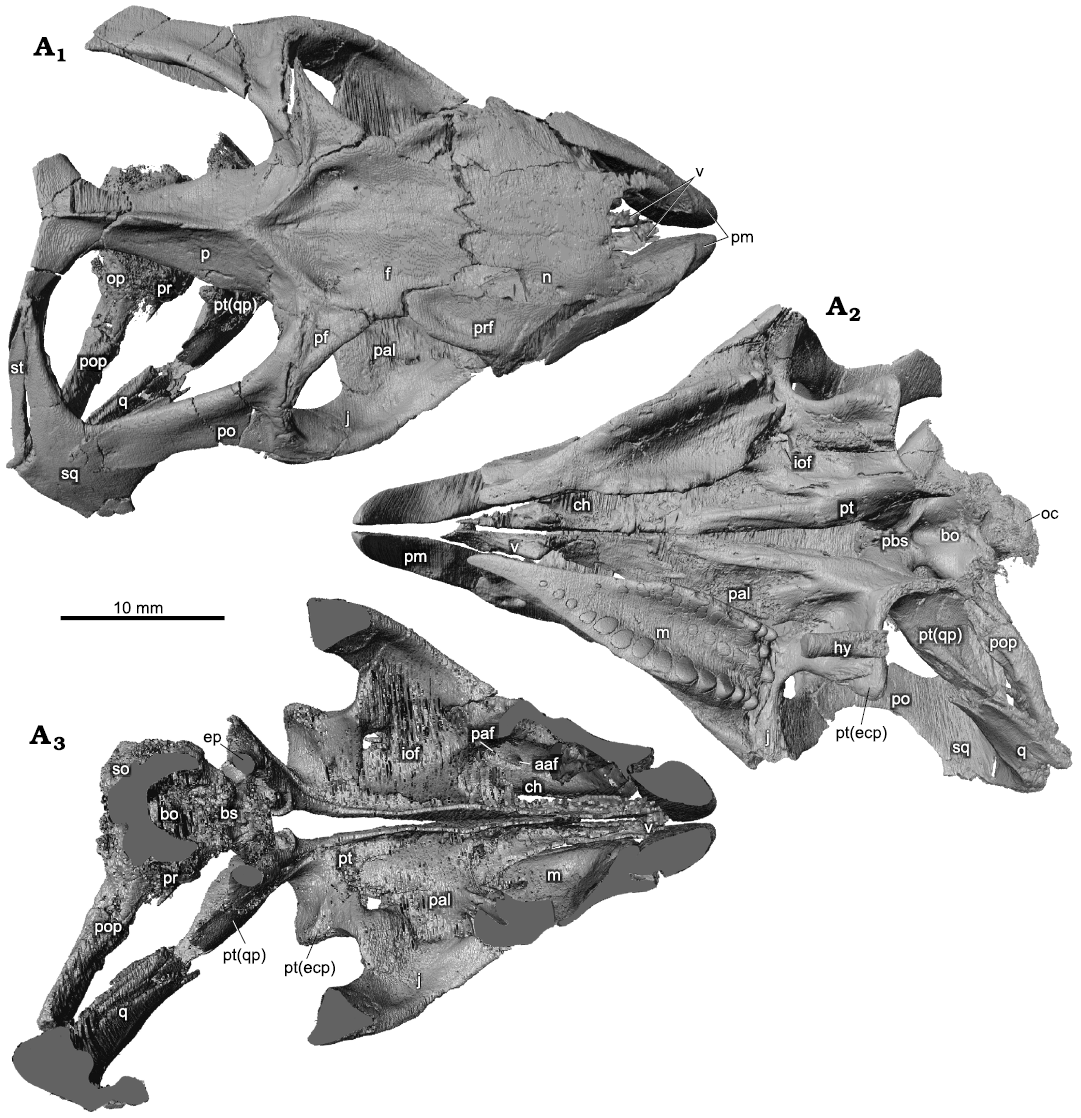
Bentonyx skull scan in top down (A1/top), from below (A2/Middle) and palatal view without maxilla (A3/bottom)

The Cladogram below is based on work by Martin Ezcurra et al.

- Rhynchosauria
  - Noteosuchus
  - Mesosuchus
  - Howesia
  - Eohyosaurus
  - Rhynchosauridae
    - Rhynchosaurus
    - - Stenaulorhynchinae
        - Mariante rhynchosaur
        - Stenaulorhynchus
      - - Langeronyx
        - - Bentonyx
          - - Fodonyx
            - Hyperodapedontinae
              - Isalorhynchus
              - - Teyumbaita
                - Hyperodapedon
