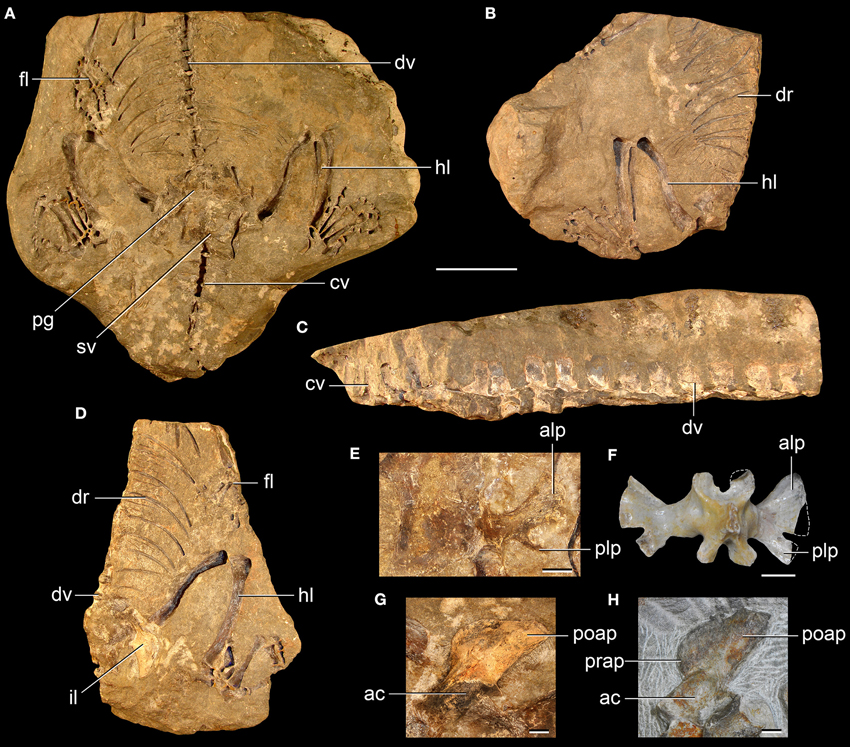
- Skeletal remains of Noteosuchus (A-E, G)

Scientific classification
- Kingdom: Animalia
- Phylum: Chordata
- Class: Reptilia
- Order: †Rhynchosauria
- Genus: †Noteosuchus; Broom, 1925

Type species
- †Noteosuchus colletti Watson, 1912

= Noteosuchus =

Noteosuchus Temporal range: Early Triassic, 250 Ma

Extinct genus of reptiles from the earliest Triassic deposits of South Africa

Noteosuchus is an extinct genus of basal rhynchosaur known from the earliest Triassic deposits of Eastern Cape Province, South Africa. It was first named by David Meredith Seares Watson in 1912 and the type species is Eosuchus colletti. The generic name Eosuchus is preoccupied by the generic name of Eosuchus lerichei Dollo, 1907, a gavialoid crocodilian known from northern France. Thus, an alternative generic name, Noteosuchus, was proposed by Robert Broom in 1925. The generic name erected by Broom (1925) is a compound, meaning "Not Eosuchus", while "Eosuchus" is derived from the name of Eos, the goddess of the dawn in Greek mythology, and suchus, Latinized from the Greek souchos, an Egyptian crocodile god, thus meaning "dawn crocodile". The specific name, colletti, honors Mr. Collett for the discovery of the holotype and only known specimen.

== Discovery ==
Noteosuchus is known solely from the holotype AM 3591, a well-preserved partial postcranial skeleton, missing the head, which is currently housed at the Albany Museum in South Africa. It was collected from a hill slope at Grassy Ridge locality, from the Katberg Formation of the Beaufort Group. This horizon belongs to the Lystrosaurus Assemblage Zone, dating to the early Induan stage of the Early Triassic period. Thus, Noteosuchus represents the geologically oldest known rhynchosaur species.

== Classification ==
David M. Dilkes (1998) suggested that Noteosuchus colletti may be a junior synonym of Mesosuchus browni, and thus this species has been widely ignored since. However, Ezcurra, Scheyer and Butler (2014) noted that this synonymy was based only on generalized rhynchosaur plesiomorphic similarities rather than autapomorphies. They found this to be unlikely because the temporal gap between the two species spans most of the Early Triassic, as Mesosuchus is otherwise known only from the Middle Triassic. Additionally, their phylogenetic analysis recovered Noteosuchus and Mesosuchus in a polytomy with Howesia browni, a result which is inconsistent with such synonymy.

Noteosuchus in a cladogram based on Ezcurra et al. (2016):

- Rhynchosauria
  - Noteosuchus
  - Mesosuchus
  - Howesia
  - Eohyosaurus
  - Rhynchosauridae
    - Rhynchosaurus
    - - Stenaulorhynchinae
        - Mariante rhynchosaur
        - Stenaulorhynchus
      - - Langeronyx
        - - Bentonyx
          - - Fodonyx
            - Hyperodapedontinae
              - Isalorhynchus
              - - Teyumbaita
                - Hyperodapedon
