= Langeronyx =

Langeronyx Temporal range: Middle Triassic, Anisian

Scientific classification
- Domain: Eukaryota
- Kingdom: Animalia
- Phylum: Chordata
- Class: Reptilia
- Clade: Archosauromorpha
- Order: †Rhynchosauria
- Family: †Rhynchosauridae
- Genus: †Langeronyx; Ezcurra et al., 2016

Type species
- †Langeronyx brodiei (Benton, 1990 [originally as Rhynchosaurus])

Extinct genus of reptiles

Langeronyx is an extinct genus of basal rhynchosaurid known from the early Middle Triassic (Anisian stage) Bromsgrove Sandstone Formation of Warwickshire, UK. It contains a single species, Langeronyx brodiei, originally included in the genus Rhynchosaurus. R. brodiei was first described and named by Michael Benton in 1990, but its redescription by Martín D. Ezcurra, Felipe Montefeltro and Richard J. Butler in 2016 recovered it as more closely related to the more advance hyperodapedontine than to the type species of Rhynchosaurus and thus it was moved to its own genus. The generic name Langeronyx honors the Brazilian paleontologist Max Cardoso Langer in recognition of his rhynchosaur research, combined with the Greek onyx (óνυξ) meaning "claw", a common suffix for rhynchosaur genera. L. brodiei is known solely from the holotype, a partial skull divided into the two specimens WARMS G6097/1 and NHMUK PV R8495, housed in the Warwickshire Museum, Warwick and Natural History Museum, London, respectively. Other specimens originally referred to R. brodiei either do not overlap with its type or can be just as likely referred to other basal rhynchosaurids (like Fodonyx spenceri and Bentonyx sidensis from the coeval Otter Sandstone Formation, UK). L. brodiei is one of two basal archosauromorphs known from the Bromsgrove Sandstone Formation, the other being the lesser known Rhombopholis scutulata.

Cladogram based on Ezcurra et al. (2016):

- Rhynchosauria
  - Noteosuchus
  - Mesosuchus
  - Howesia
  - Eohyosaurus
  - Rhynchosauridae
    - Rhynchosaurus
    - - Stenaulorhynchinae
        - Mariante rhynchosaur
        - Stenaulorhynchus
      - - Langeronyx
        - - Bentonyx
          - - Fodonyx
            - Hyperodapedontinae
              - Isalorhynchus
              - - Teyumbaita
                - Hyperodapedon

== Links ==
- 3d-fossils.ac.uk - WARMS G6097/1
- Paleobiology Database - Langeronyx
