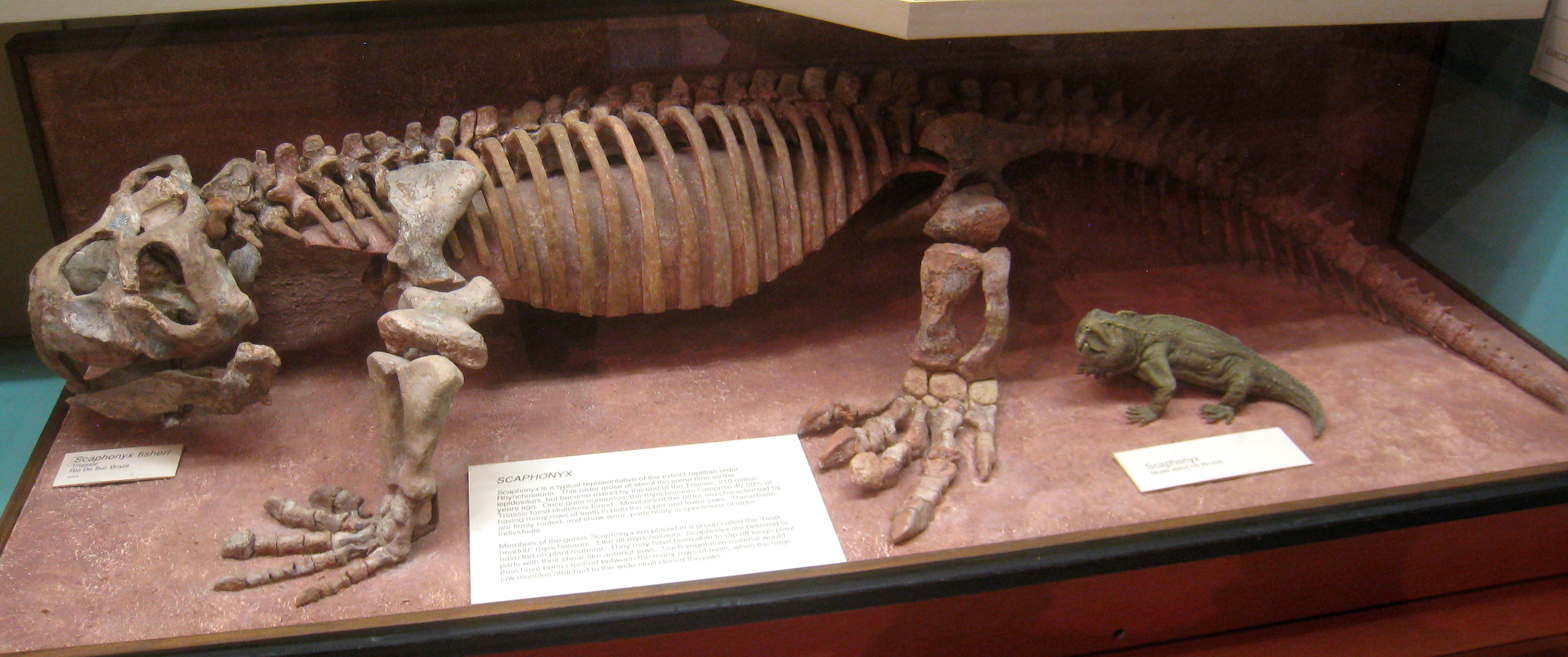
- Mounted skeleton model of Hyperodapedon sanjuanensis, from Late Triassic (Carnian) South America

Scientific classification
- Kingdom: Animalia
- Phylum: Chordata
- Class: Reptilia
- Clade: Archosauromorpha
- Clade: Crocopoda
- Order: †Rhynchosauria; Osborn 1903

Subgroups
- †Colobops?; †Eohyosaurus; †Howesia; †Mesosuchus; †Noteosuchus; †Rhynchosauridae; †Eifelosaurus; †Rhynchosaurus; †Stenaulorhynchinae; †Ammorhynchus; †Brasinorhynchus; †Elorhynchus; †Mesodapedon; †Stenaulorhynchus; †Hyperodapedontidae; †Bentonyx; †Fodonyx; †Langeronyx; †Hyperodapedontinae

Synonyms
- Gnathodontia Owen, 1859

= Rhynchosauria =

Rhynchosaurs Temporal range: Early-Late Triassic, Induan-early Norian

Extinct order of reptiles

Rhynchosaurs are a group of extinct herbivorous Triassic archosauromorph reptiles, belonging to the order Rhynchosauria. Rhynchosaurs are distinguished by their triangular skulls and elongated, beak like premaxillary bones. Rhynchosaurs first appeared in the Early Triassic, reaching their broadest abundance and a global distribution during the Carnian stage of the Late Triassic, before dying out early in the succeeding Norian stage.

== Description ==
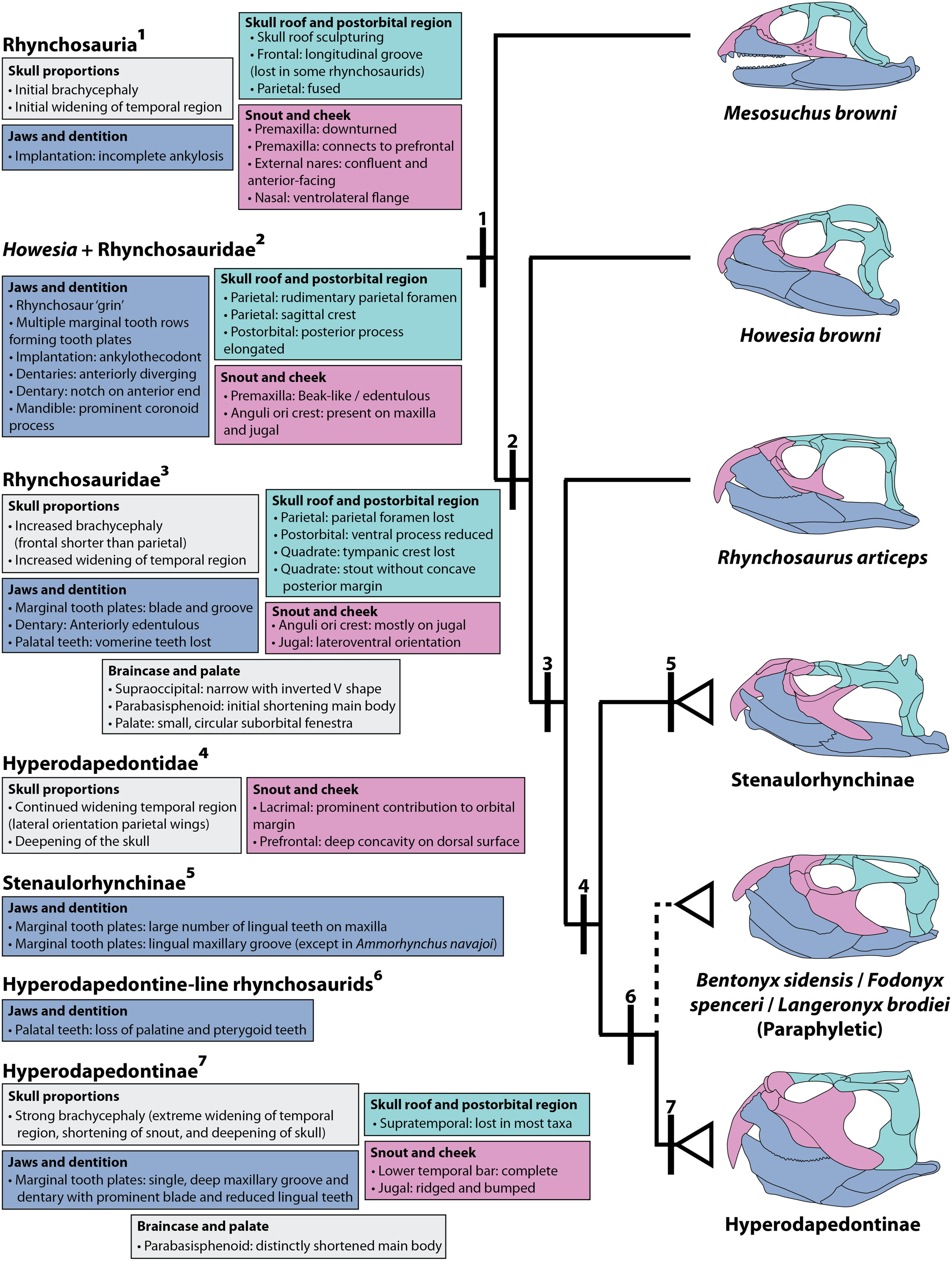
Diagram showing progressive skull evolution in rhynchosaurs

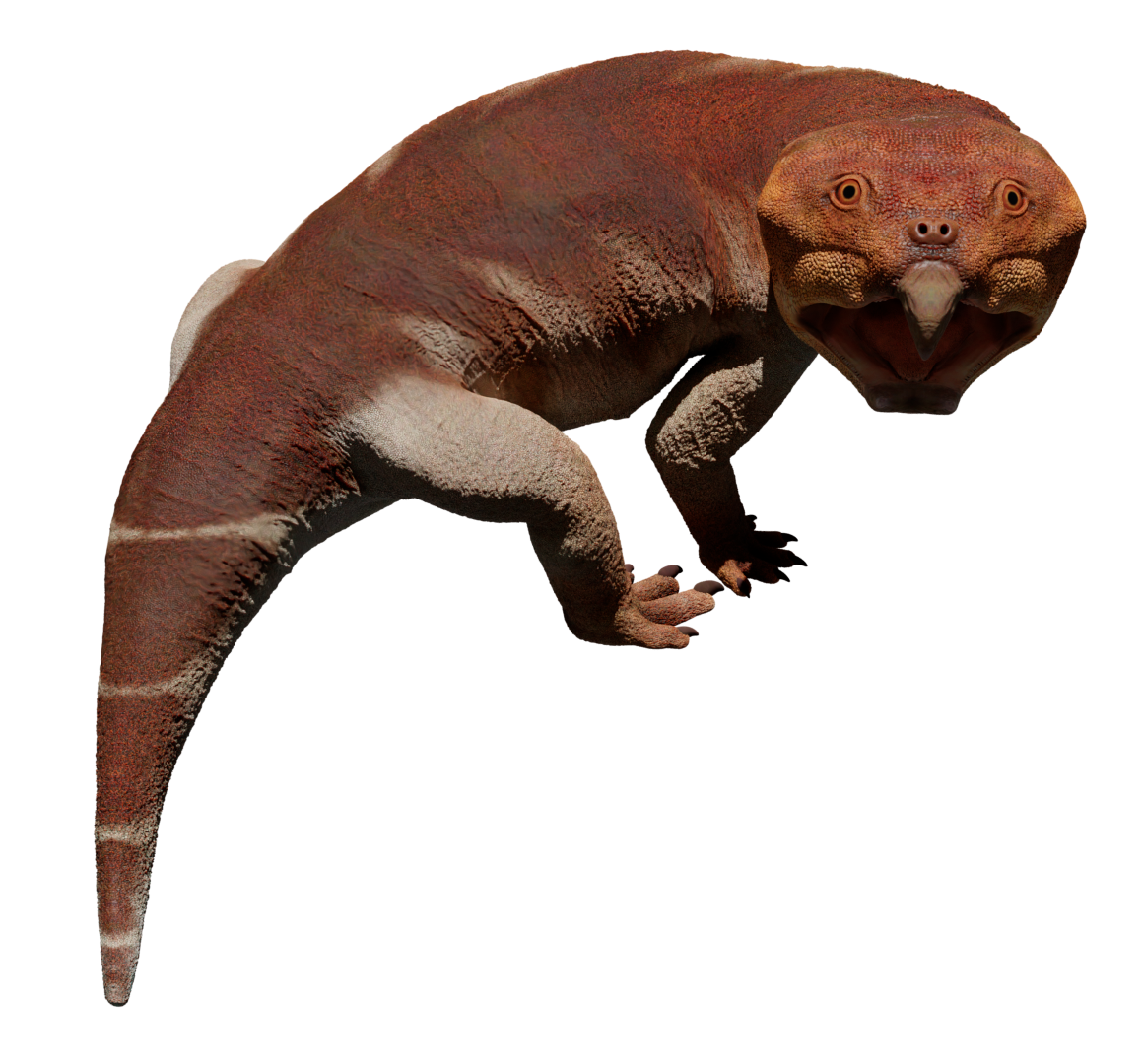
Life restoration of Hyperodapedon sanjuanensis, from Late Triassic (Carnian) South America

Rhynchosaurs were herbivores, and at times abundant (in some fossil localities accounting for 40 to 60% of specimens found), with stocky bodies and a powerful beak. Early primitive forms, like Mesosuchus and Howesia, were generally small, typically lizard-like in build, and had skulls rather similar to the early diapsid Youngina, except for the beak and a few other features. Later and more advanced genera grew upto 2.25 metres or more in length, like in the case of an articulated specimen from Lower Maleri Formation. The hind feet were equipped with massive claws, presumably for digging up roots and tubers by backwards scratching of the hind limbs. Rhynchosaurs probably had a semi-erect posture (intermediate between most reptiles, which have a sprawling posture, and dinosaurs and mammals, which acquired an erect posture with a narrow stance).

The skulls of later rhynchosaurs were short, broad, and triangular, becoming much wider than long in the most advanced forms like Hyperodapedon. The toothless premaxilla bone, at the tip of the snout, extended outwards and downwards to form the upper beak. The broad skull had a deep cheek region which would have accommodated powerful jaw muscles. The lower jaw was also deep, and when the mouth was closed it clamped firmly into the maxilla (upper edge of the jaw), like the blade of a penknife closing into its handle. This scissors-like action would have enabled rhynchosaurs to cut up tough plant material.

The teeth were unusual; those in the maxilla and palate were modified into broad tooth plates, with multiple rows of grinding teeth interspersed with grooves that shear against the lower jaw. Many rhynchosaur species can be distinguished from each other by the structure of their tooth plates. They had a fixed number of teeth, and similar to elephants, those that were further back in the jaws replaced teeth that were worn out as the animal grew in size and the teeth were worn out because of a diet of very tough plants. Rhynchosaur teeth were ankylothecodont, similar to the acrodonty of modern tuataras and some lizards, but differing in the presence of deep roots.

== Evolution ==
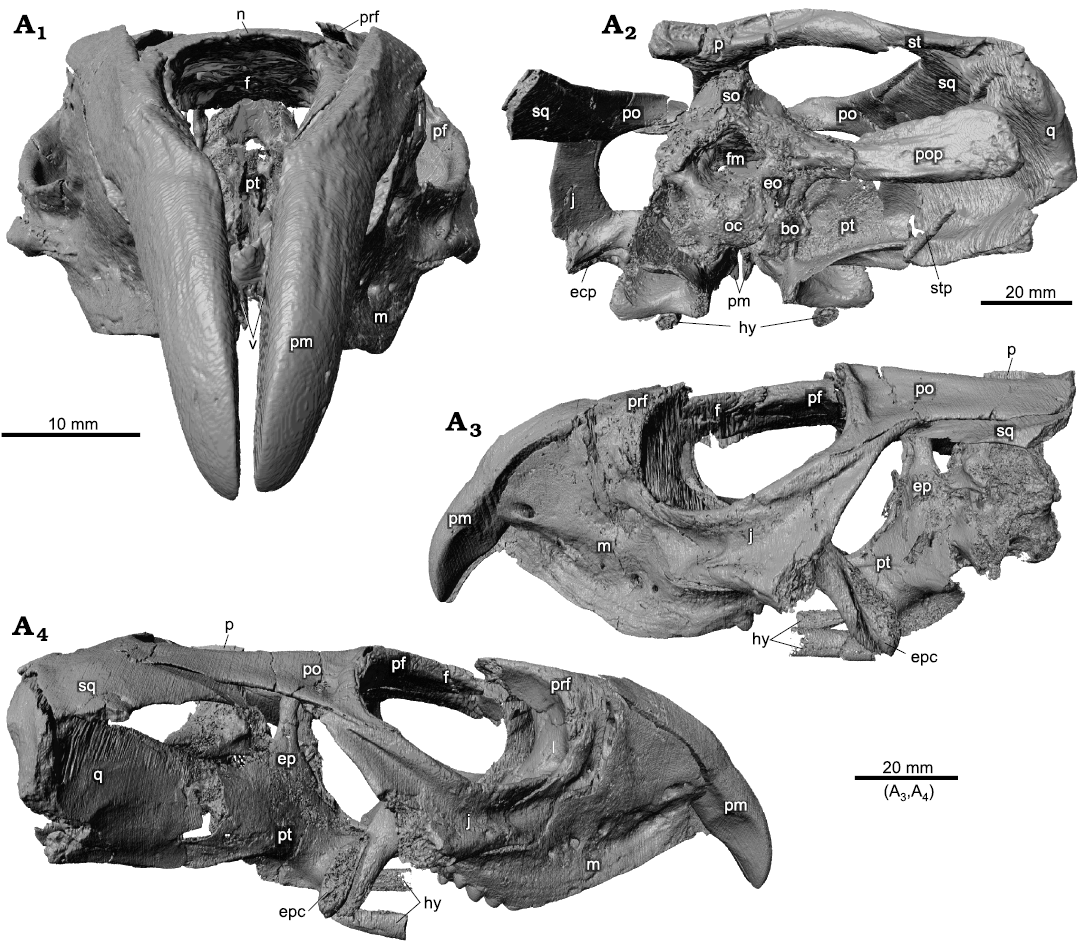
Skull of Bentonyx, from Middle Triassic England

Rhynchosaurs first appeared during the Induan, the first stage of the Triassic, appearing shortly after the end-Permian mass extinction, as part of a major diversification of reptiles during this period. Like many animals of this time, they had a worldwide distribution, being found across Pangea, being especially common in the southern Gondwanan part of Pangaea, though with records also in Europe and North America. Over their evolution, rhynchosaurs saw a progressive increase in their body size. It has been suggested that rhynchosaurs went extinct near the end of the Carnian stage during the early Late Triassic as part of an end-Carnian extinction event.

Spielmann, Lucas and Hunt (2013) described three distal ends of humeri from the Bull Canyon Formation (Norian stage) in New Mexico. They interpreted these bones as belonging to rhynchosaurs within the species Otischalkia elderae; thus, they argued that these fossils indicate that rhynchosaur survival into the Norian. However, "Otischalkia" fossils were later reinterpreted as belonging to malerisaurine azendohsaurids. Rhynchosaurs apparently still survived into the Norian in Brazil, as Teyumbaita is known from the lower part of the Norian-age Caturrita Formation.

== Classification ==
=== Relationship to other reptiles ===
Historically, rhynchosaurs were considered to be closely related to Rhynchocephalia, the clade that includes the living tuatara and its extinct relatives. Today however the two groups are considered to be unrelated: rhynchosaurs are considered to be archosauromorphs (more closely related to modern crocodilians and birds), while rhynchocephalians are lepidosauromorphs (closer to lizards). Rhynchosaurs are considered members of the archosauromorph subclade Crocopoda.

Cladogram of Archosauromorpha after Schoch et al. 2025:

- Archosauromorpha
  - †Jesairosaurus
  - - †Protorosaurus
    - - †Prolacerta
      - †Tanysauria
      - Crocopoda
        - †Allokotosauria
        - - †Rhynchosauria
          - - †Teyujagua
            - Archosauriformes

=== Ingroup relationships ===
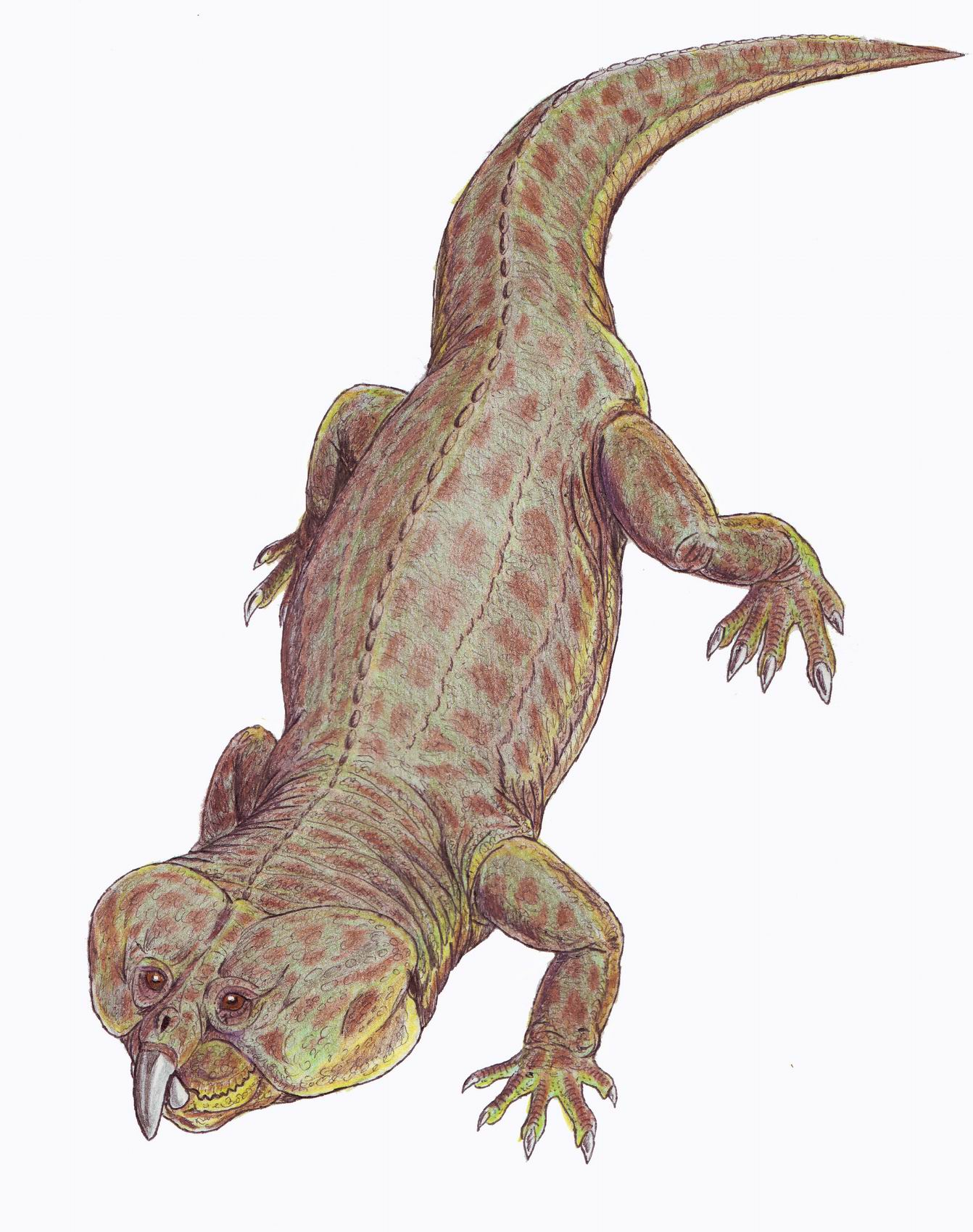
Hyperodapedon huxleyi (=Paradapedon), from Late Triassic (Carnian) India

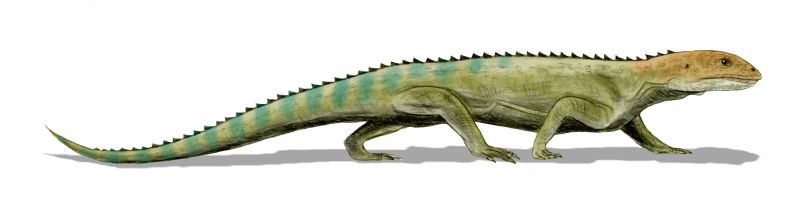
Mesosuchus browni, from Early Triassic South Africa

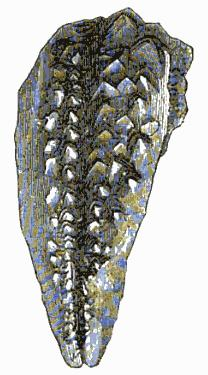
Illustration of the ventral surface of a tooth plate of Hyperodapedon.

The Rhynchosauria includes a single family, named Rhynchosauridae. All rhynchosaurs, apart from the Early and Middle Triassic genera, Eohyosaurus, Mesosuchus, Howesia and Noteosuchus, are included in this family. Hyperodapedontidae, named by Lydekker (1885), was considered its junior synonym. However, Langer et al. (2000) noted that Hyperodapedontidae was erected by Lydekker to include Hyperodapedon gordoni and H. huxleyi, clearly excluding Rhynchosaurus articeps, which was the only other rhynchosaur known at that time. Thus, they defined Hyperodapedontidae as the stem-based taxon that includes all rhynchosaurs more closely related to Hyperodapedon than to Rhynchosaurus.

Within Hyperodapedontidae, which is now a subgroup of Rhynchosauridae, two subfamilies have been named. Stenaulorhynchinae, named by Kuhn (1933), is defined sensu Langer and Schultz (2000) to include all species more closely related to Stenaulorhynchus than to Hyperodapedon. Hyperodapedontinae, named by Chatterjee (1969), was redefined by Langer et al. (2000) to include "all rhynchosaurs closer to Hyperodapedon than to "Rhynchosaurus" spenceri" (now Fodonyx).

The cladogram below shows the relationships of many named rhynchosaurs, following the results of Spiekman and colleagues (2026), who recognized Eohyosaurus as a junior synonym of Howesia.

- †Rhynchosauria
  - - Mesosuchus browni
    - Noteosuchus colletti
  - - Howesia browni
    - Rhynchosauridae
      - Rhynchosaurus articeps
      - - Eifelosaurus triadicus
        - - Stenaulorhynchinae
            - Ammorhynchus navajoi
            - - Mesodapedon kuttyi
              - - Brasinorhynchus mariantensis
                - Stenaulorhynchus stockleyi
          - - Bentonyx sidensis
            - - Langeronyx brodiei
              - - Fodonyx spenceri
                - Hyperodapedontinae
                  - Isalorhynchus genovefae
                  - - Oryctorhynchus bairdi
                    - - - Hyperodapedon mariensis
                        - Hyperodapedon sanjuanensis
                      - - - Hyperodapedon huenei
                          - Teyumbaita sulcognathus
                        - - Hyperodapedon gordoni
                          - Hyperodapedon huxleyi

=== List of genera ===
List of rhynchosaur genera
| Genus | Species | Age | Location | Unit | Notes |
|---|---|---|---|---|---|
| Ammorhynchus | A. navajoi | Anisian | US (Arizona) | Moenkopi Formation | A stenaulorhynchine |
| Beesiiwo | B. cooowuse | Carnian | US (Wyoming) | Popo Agie Formation | A hyperodapedontine previously referred to Hyperodapedon |
| Brasinorhynchus | B. mariantensis | Ladinian | Brazil | Santa Maria Formation | A stenaulorhynchine, previously known as the "Mariante Rhynchosaur" |
| Bentonyx | B. sidensis | late Anisian | UK (England) | Otter Sandstone Formation | A basal hyperodapedontid |
| Eifelosaurus | E. triadicus | early Anisian | Germany | Röt Formation | A basal rhynchosaurid |
| Elorhynchus | E. carrolli | late Ladinian? - earliest Carnian? | Argentina | Chañares Formation (Tarjadia Assemblage Zone) | A stenaulorhynchine |
| Eohyosaurus | E. wolvaardti | early Anisian | South Africa | Burgersdorp Formation (Cynognathus Assemblage Zone) | A basal (non-rhynchosaurid) rhynchosaur |
| Fodonyx | F. spenceri | late Anisian | UK (England) | Otter Sandstone Formation | A basal hyperodapedontid |
| Howesia | H. browni | early Anisian | South Africa | Burgersdorp Formation (Cynognathus Assemblage Zone) | A basal (non-rhynchosaurid) rhynchosaur |
| Hyperodapedon | H. gordoni | Carnian | UK (Scotland) | Lossiemouth Sandstone Formation | A hyperodapedontine, one of the most abundant and speciose rhynchosaur genera. Up to six valid species have been named, the most of any rhynchosaur. Some of these species are sometimes split into other genera, such as Scaphonyx (H. sanjuanensis), Paradapedon (H. huxleyi), and Macrocephalosaurus (H. mariensis). |
| Hyperodapedon | H. huenei | Carnian | Brazil | Santa Maria Formation | A hyperodapedontine, one of the most abundant and speciose rhynchosaur genera. Up to six valid species have been named, the most of any rhynchosaur. Some of these species are sometimes split into other genera, such as Scaphonyx (H. sanjuanensis), Paradapedon (H. huxleyi), and Macrocephalosaurus (H. mariensis). |
| Hyperodapedon | H. huxleyi | Carnian | India | Lower Maleri Formation | A hyperodapedontine, one of the most abundant and speciose rhynchosaur genera. Up to six valid species have been named, the most of any rhynchosaur. Some of these species are sometimes split into other genera, such as Scaphonyx (H. sanjuanensis), Paradapedon (H. huxleyi), and Macrocephalosaurus (H. mariensis). |
| Hyperodapedon | H. mariensis | Carnian | Brazil; Argentina | Santa Maria Formation; Ischigualasto Formation | A hyperodapedontine, one of the most abundant and speciose rhynchosaur genera. Up to six valid species have been named, the most of any rhynchosaur. Some of these species are sometimes split into other genera, such as Scaphonyx (H. sanjuanensis), Paradapedon (H. huxleyi), and Macrocephalosaurus (H. mariensis). |
| Hyperodapedon | H. sanjuanensis | Carnian | Argentina; Brazil | Ischigualasto Formation; Santa Maria Formation | A hyperodapedontine, one of the most abundant and speciose rhynchosaur genera. Up to six valid species have been named, the most of any rhynchosaur. Some of these species are sometimes split into other genera, such as Scaphonyx (H. sanjuanensis), Paradapedon (H. huxleyi), and Macrocephalosaurus (H. mariensis). |
| Hyperodapedon | H. tikiensis | Carnian | India | Tiki Formation | A hyperodapedontine, one of the most abundant and speciose rhynchosaur genera. Up to six valid species have been named, the most of any rhynchosaur. Some of these species are sometimes split into other genera, such as Scaphonyx (H. sanjuanensis), Paradapedon (H. huxleyi), and Macrocephalosaurus (H. mariensis). |
| Isalorhynchus | I. genovefae | Carnian | Madagascar | Makay Formation (Isalo II) | A hyperodapedontine occasionally referred to Hyperodapedon |
| Isodapedon | I. varzealis | Carnian | Brazil | Santa Maria Formation | A hyperodapedontine |
| Langeronyx | L. brodiei | Anisian | UK (England) | Bromsgrove Sandstone Formation | A basal hyperodapedontid |
| Mesodapedon | M. kuttyi | Anisian | India | Yerrapalli Formation | A stenaulorhynchine |
| Mesosuchus | M. browni | early Anisian | South Africa | Burgersdorp Formation (Cynognathus Assemblage Zone) | A basal (non-rhynchosaurid) rhynchosaur |
| Noteosuchus | N. colletti | early Induan | South Africa | Katberg Formation (Lystrosaurus Assemblage Zone) | A basal (non-rhynchosaurid) rhynchosaur; the earliest known species of rhynchosaur, and the only known Early Triassic representative |
| Oryctorhynchus | O. bairdi | latest Carnian?-earliest Norian? | Canada (Nova Scotia) | Wolfville Formation | A hyperodapedontine previously referred to Hyperodapedon |
| Rhynchosaurus | R. articeps | Anisian | UK (England) | Tarporley Siltstone Formation | A basal rhynchosaurid |
| Stenaulorhynchus | S. stockleyi | late Anisian | Tanzania | Manda Formation | A stenaulorhynchine |
| Supradapedon | S. stockleyi | Middle - Late Triassic | Tanzania | Tunduru district | A hyperodapedontine previously referred to Hyperodapedon |
| Teyumbaita | T. sulcognathus | late Carnian - early Norian | Brazil; Argentina | Caturrita Formation; Ischigualasto Formation | The latest surviving species, and the only rhynchosaur known with confidence to have survived into the Norian stage |
