= Elorhynchus =

Elorhynchus Temporal range: Mid-Late Triassic Ladinian–Carnian

Scientific classification
- Kingdom: Animalia
- Phylum: Chordata
- Class: Reptilia
- Order: †Rhynchosauria
- Family: †Rhynchosauridae
- Subfamily: †Stenaulorhynchinae
- Genus: †Elorhynchus; Ezcurra et al., 2021

Type species
- †Elorhynchus carrolli Ezcurra et al., 2021

Extinct genus of reptiles

Elorhynchus is an extinct genus of stenaulorhynchine rhynchosaur from the Mid-Late Triassic Chañares Formation of Argentina. The type species is Elorhynchus carrolli.
