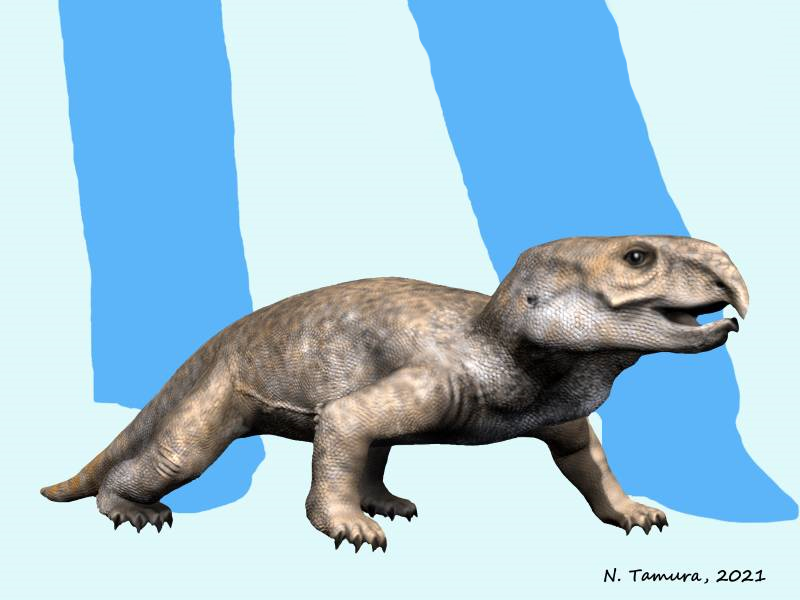
- Restoration of F. spenceri compared to a human

Scientific classification
- Domain: Eukaryota
- Kingdom: Animalia
- Phylum: Chordata
- Class: Reptilia
- Clade: Archosauromorpha
- Order: †Rhynchosauria
- Family: †Hyperodapedontidae
- Genus: †Fodonyx; Hone & Benton, 2008

Species
- †F. spenceri (Benton, 1990) (type)

= Fodonyx =

Fodonyx Temporal range: Middle Triassic, Anisian

Extinct genus of reptiles

Fodonyx (meaning "digging claw") is an extinct genus of rhynchosaur from the middle Triassic epoch of Devon in England. Its fossils (25 specimens) were discovered in Otter Sandstone Formation (late Anisian age) and were first assigned to Rhynchosaurus spenceri. This species was reassigned to its own genus, Fodonyx (the type and only species is Fodonyx spenceri) the holotype of which is EXEMS 60/1985/292, that described by David W. E. Hone and Michael J. Benton in 2008. In 2010, one skull was reassigned to the new genus Bentonyx. It is distinguished from other rhynchosaurs by a single autapomorphy, the ventral angling of the paraoccipital processes. In all other rhynchosaurs these processes angle dorsally or are horizontal. It is not known if this conferred any advantage to Fodonyx. Fodonyx was between 40 and 50 cm long.

== Features ==
=== Skull and lower jaw ===
The two premaxillae are very long and run up over the snout to meet the prefrontals at the orbit. At the anterior tip they are narrow and triangular in cross-section. They form the classic rhynchosaurian beak, and there is evidence on the fossil showing that it was probably covered by a keratinous sheath. The maxilla carries a massive tooth plate and has numerous foramina for nerves and blood vessels to reach the gums through. Many of the posterior and lateral teeth are unworn from use, unlike the more anterior teeth which have been worn smooth. The nasal bones are large, but no wider than the frontals. They form a pointed posterior tip with a strong zigzag suture. The lacrimal ducts are clearly visible next to the orbit, while the lacrimal bones form much of the interior surface of the orbit. The prefrontal forms a thick eyebrow ridge, possibly as protection from predators. The jugal is complex, with four branches, and forms the anterior and ventral margins of the lower temporal fenestra. The dorsal branch forms a strong pillar behind the orbit, which has a more pronounced crest than other rhynchosaurs. The frontals are very long, and form a dish shape posteriorly. The postfrontal is triangular and forms part of the back of the orbit. The parietals are fused and have a high narrow ridge dorsally, with lateral wings extending across the upper temporal fenestrae. The postorbitals are roughly T-shaped, with three branches. Unlike Late Triassic forms, Fodonyx has a supratemporal bone. The quadratojugal and quadrate are mainly missing. One squamosal is preserved, forming much of the posterior margin of the skull. Much of the palate is intact, although the vomeronasals are quite degraded due to their length and thinness. The palatines form most of the borders of the choana. The pterygoids are very large and have three main processes, all broad and flat. The ectopterygoids are very small and hidden in palatal view. Small fragments of the hyoids are preserved, with a circular cross section and lateral striations. The basioccipital is short and attached to the narrow basisphenoid. The occipital condyle is hemispherical. Much of the detail on the paraoccipital is hard to make out due to difficulties of preparation. Only the anterior portions of the lower jaw are well preserved, but it has the typical rhynchosaur shape, curving up to the anterior tip. Teeth are mainly obscured as the jaws are tightly shut. The splenial is narrow except at the tip where it supports the symphyseal plate.

=== Spine and vertebrae ===
Cervical and sacral vertebrae are not known, only dorsal and caudal. The dorsal vertebrae have round centra which narrow noticeably towards the centre of the bone, and are deeply amphicoelous. They lack a keel, but have a deep excavation in the floor of the neural canal. Neural arches are around 15 mm tall, with narrow pillars supporting the zygapophyses, and are attached by broad flat facets. The zygapophyses are almost circular and very flat, which would allow side-to-side movement but little up-and-down movement. Three chevrons are preserved. The dorsal elements have fused to create a triangular opening.

=== Ribs and gastralia ===
Many ribs are present, although partially fragmented, and show that the ribs were robust and the rib cage deep. They were also remarkably straight, at least at the anterior. There are also many gastralia, although these are quite jumbled together, and appear to be made of three segments. The gastral basket is almost entirely disarticulated.

=== Forelimbs and pectoral girdle ===
The scapulae have broad blades, and prominent bosses where the clavicles may have attached. Much of the front limbs are missing, but the humeri were broad and not very long, with an oval cross-section.

=== Hindlimbs and pelvic girdle ===
The pelvis is incomplete, with the ilium clearly showing growth lines. The ischium has a thick round dorsal margin and a curved blade. The femur is missing, but the remainder of the hindlimb is present. The tibia is fairly long but quite thin, with a compressed oval cross-section. It shows heavy wear, and has a distinct twist where it probably attached to the fibula. This is more slender than the tibia, but still relatively robust. All the proximal tarsals and three of the distal tarsals are present, but are worn and broken. In general, they are quite rounded. The first metatarsal is short and broad but the other four are long and flat, although they are broken so it is hard to say exactly how long. The toes have, respectively, 2,3,4,5 and 4 phalanges. These all narrow as they head towards the claws. The unguals are all very large and broad, and have rounded ends without a recurve. Each ungual bears a shallow groove along the sides, probably for locking the keratin sheath.

== Taxonomy ==
Cladogram based on Ezcurra et al. (2016):

- Rhynchosauria
  - Noteosuchus
  - Mesosuchus
  - Howesia
  - Eohyosaurus
  - Rhynchosauridae
    - Rhynchosaurus
    - - Stenaulorhynchinae
        - Mariante rhynchosaur
        - Stenaulorhynchus
      - - Langeronyx
        - - Bentonyx
          - - Fodonyx
            - Hyperodapedontinae
              - Isalorhynchus
              - - Teyumbaita
                - Hyperodapedon

== Links ==
- "EXEMS 60/1985/292". 3d-fossils.ac.uk. Archived from the original on 2018-07-08.
- "Fodonyx". Fossilworks.
