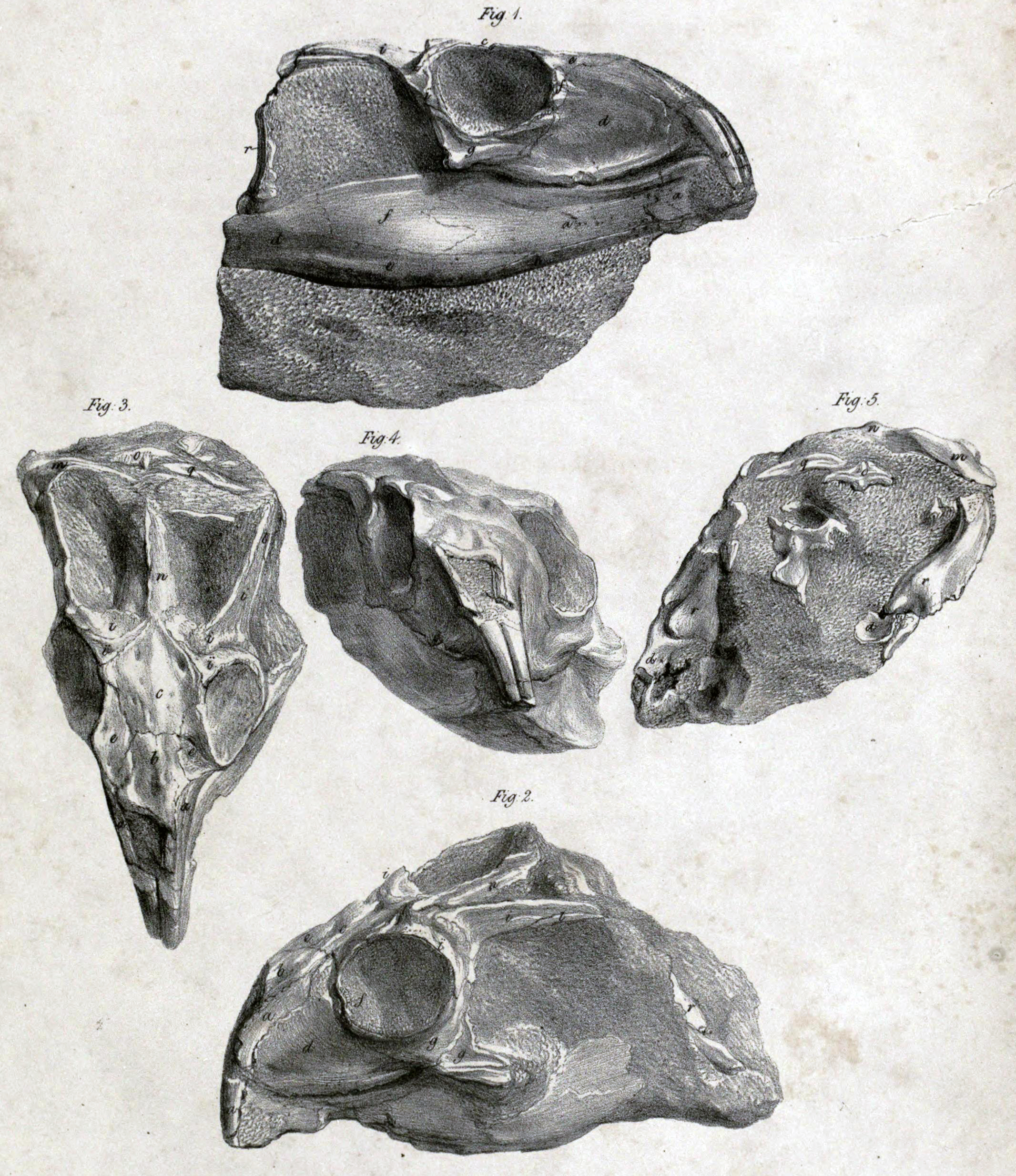
- Skull of Rhynchosaurus articeps
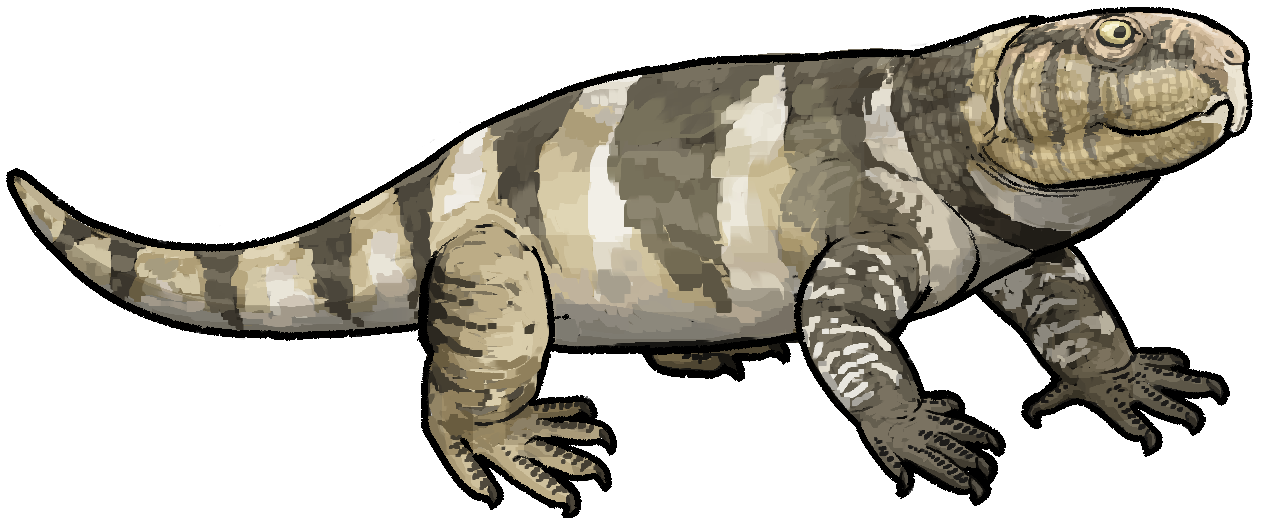
- Life Restoration

Scientific classification
- Domain: Eukaryota
- Kingdom: Animalia
- Phylum: Chordata
- Class: Reptilia
- Clade: Archosauromorpha
- Order: †Rhynchosauria
- Family: †Rhynchosauridae
- Genus: †Rhynchosaurus; Owen, 1842

Species
- †R. articeps Owen, 1842 (type)

= Rhynchosaurus =

Rhynchosaurus Temporal range: Middle Triassic (Anisian) ~247.2–242.0 Ma

Extinct genus of reptiles

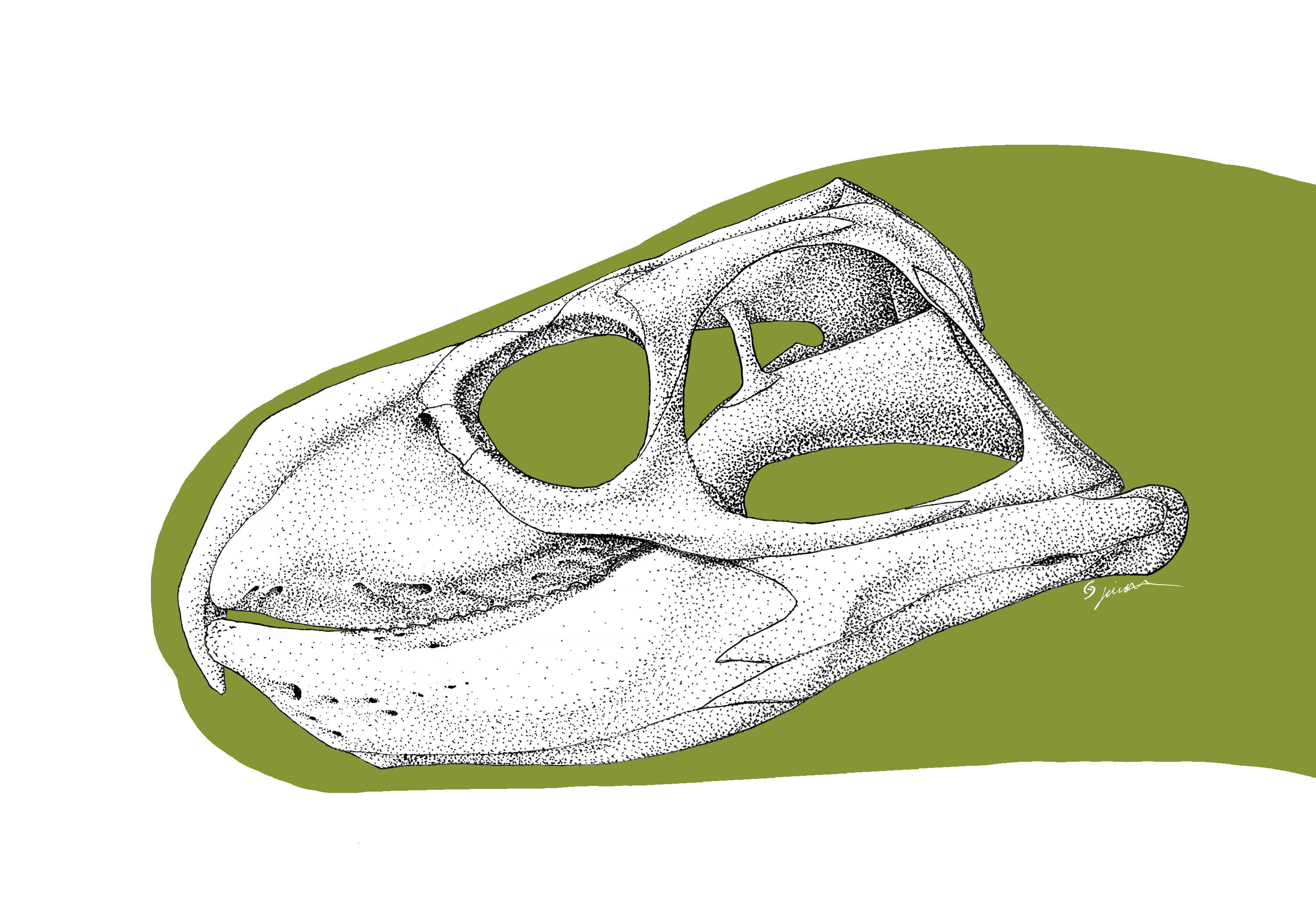
Restored skull

Rhynchosaurus (beaked lizard) is a genus of rhynchosaur that lived during the Middle Triassic period. It lived in Europe. It was related to the archosaurs, but not within that group. The type species of Rhynchosaurus is R. articeps. Michael Benton named two additional species, R. spenceri and R. brodiei, but they were subsequently renamed Fodonyx and Langeronyx respectively. Fossils of Rhynchosaurus have been found in the Tarporley Siltstone Formation (Mercia Mudstone Group) and possibly the Sherwood Sandstone Group of the United Kingdom.

== Phylogeny ==
Cladogram based on Ezcurra et al., 2016:

- Rhynchosauria
  - Noteosuchus
  - Mesosuchus
  - Howesia
  - Eohyosaurus
  - Rhynchosauridae
    - Rhynchosaurus
    - - Stenaulorhynchinae
        - Mariante rhynchosaur
        - Stenaulorhynchus
      - - Langeronyx
        - - Bentonyx
          - - Fodonyx
            - Hyperodapedontinae
              - Isalorhynchus
              - - Teyumbaita
                - Hyperodapedon
