= Eohyosaurus =

Eohyosaurus Temporal range: Middle Triassic, 246 Ma

Scientific classification
- Kingdom: Animalia
- Phylum: Chordata
- Class: Reptilia
- Order: †Rhynchosauria
- Genus: †Eohyosaurus; Butler et al., 2015

Type species
- †Eohyosaurus wolvaardti Butler et al., 2015

Extinct genus of reptiles

Eohyosaurus is an extinct genus of basal rhynchosaur known from the early Middle Triassic (early Anisian stage) Burgersdorp Formation of Free State, South Africa. It contains a single species, Eohyosaurus wolvaardti.

== Discovery and naming ==
Eohyosaurus is known solely from the holotype SAM-PK-K10159, a partial skull missing the front end, with associated incomplete lower jaws currently housed at the Iziko South African Museum, Cape Town. The specimen was discovered by Frederik Petrus Wolvaardt in December 2000, loose on boulder-strewn slopes at the base of a cliff, at Farm Lemoenfontein 44, Rouxville District of the Free State Province. It was collected from the middle deposits of the Burgersdorp Formation of the Beaufort Group. This horizon belongs to Subzone B of the Cynognathus Assemblage Zone, dating to the early Anisian stage of the early Middle Triassic period, about 246 million years ago. Farm Lemoenfontein 44 also yielded remains of the archosauriform Erythrosuchus africanus, the bauriid Microgomphodon oligocynus, the cynodont Trirachodon, the kannemeyeriid Kannemeyeria as well as unidentified procolophonid remains. All known basal rhynchosaurs came from similar deposits in the Beau fort Group, and while Howesia browni and Mesosuchus browni are also known from Subzone B of Burgersdorp Formation (from different localities), Noteosuchus colletti is known from the earliest Triassic Katberg Formation (Lystrosaurus Assemblage Zone).

Eohyosaurus was first described and named by Richard J. Butler, Martín D. Ezcurra, Felipe C. Montefeltro, Adun Samathi and Gabriela Sobral in 2015 and the type species is Eohyosaurus wolvaardti. The generic name is derived from Greek eos, meaning "early"/"dawn", hyos, meaning "pig"/"hog", and sauros meaning "lizard", in reference to Eohyosaurus being one of the earliest stratigraphically occurring rhynchosaurs, a group commonly described as "pig-like reptiles". The specific name honors Frederik Petrus Wolvaardt, who discovered the type specimen SAM-PK-K10159.

== Description ==
Due to the limited material known of Eohyosaurus, the holotype partial skull was scanned in the Museum für Naturkunde, Berlin, focusing on its tooth rows and endocranium due to being too large to be scanned completely. The computed tomography data was provided to the Iziko South African Museum to be archived along with the holotype. Eohyosaurus possesses one autapomorphy, a unique trait among Rhynchosauria, a jugal bone with an elongate dorsal portion that forms the entire front margin of the infratemporal fenestra and that articulates from the front with the entire back margin of the elongated bottom portion of the postorbital bone. Other traits that together comprise a unique combination of characters include some traits that are shared with Howesia and Rhynchosauridae, but not with Mesosuchus. Such traits include the presence of a sagittal crest on the parietal bone, maxillae and dentaries that are expanded from the middle to the sides, and teeth present on both the occlusal and lingual surfaces. However, unlike rhynchosaurids, but like both Howesia and Mesosuchus, Eohyosaurus lacks a longitudinal occlusal groove and an occlusal blade on its maxillae and dentaries, respectively. Like in Rhynchosauridae and possibly Howesia (but not Mesosuchus), the occlusal margin of its maxilla is offset to the bottom from the lower margin of the main body of the jugal bone. Unlike rhynchosaurids that possess a short anguli oris crest on the jugal, in Eohyosaurus it is present on the side surface of the maxilla, while Mesosuchus lacks it entirely, and it is unknown in Howesia. As in Howesia but not Mesosuchus and most rhynchosaurids (where it contacts the quadratojugal), the back portion of its jugal is short and ends at approximately 50% of the front-to-back length of the infratemporal fenestra. Unlike in both Howesia and Mesosuchus, but similarly to the rhynchosaurids, the elongated back portion of the postorbital ends above the front margin of the bottom portion of the squamosal. Finally, as in Mesosuchus and Rhynchosauridae (but not Howesia), the elongated bottom portion of the squamosal extends for more than 50% of the back margin of the infratemporal fenestra.

In 2026, Spiekman and colleagues recognized E. wolvaardti as a junior synonym of Howesia browni based on newly recognized shared anatomical traits not recognized when the former was named in 2015.

== Classification ==
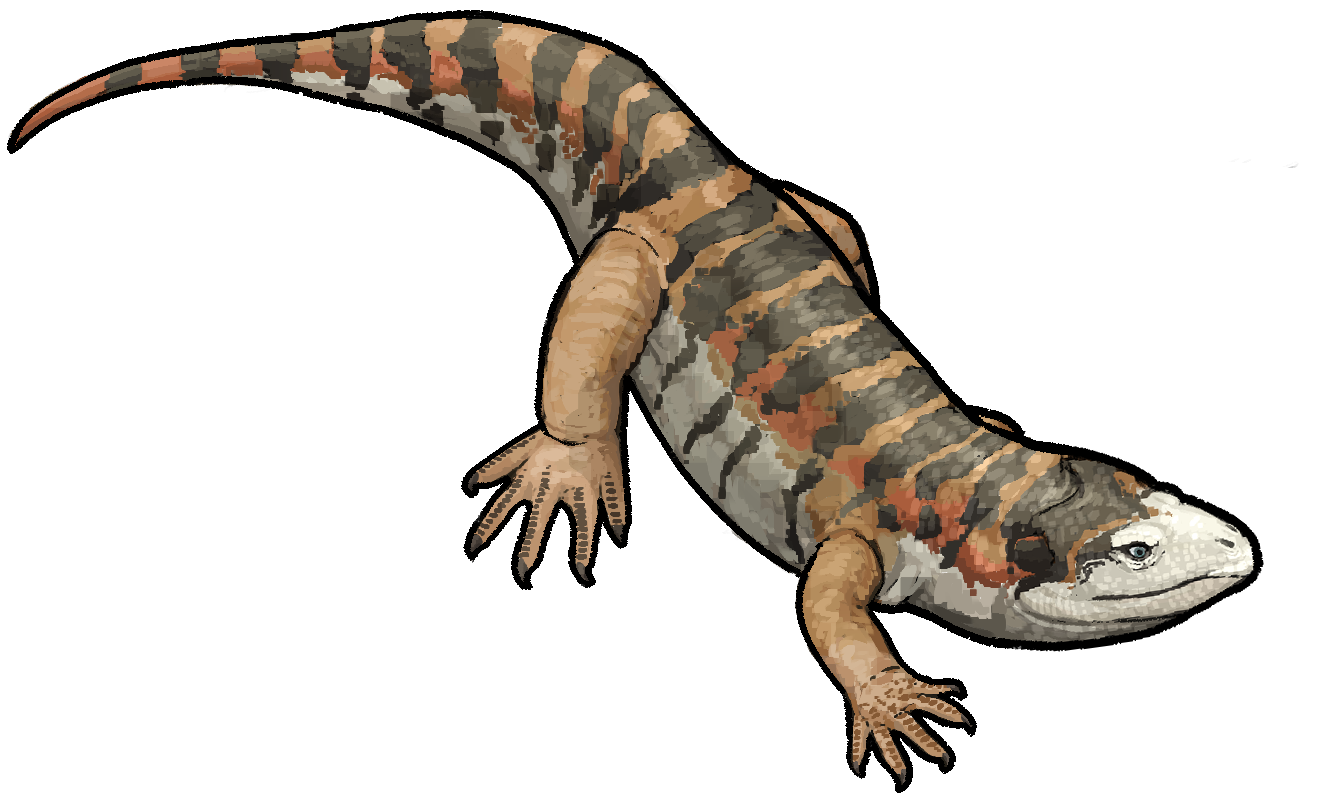
Life restoration of Howesia browni, a probable senior synonym

The following cladogram is simplified after the phylogenetic analysis of Butler et al. (2015) and shows the placement of Eohyosaurus within Rhynchosauria. Butler et al. (2015) used an updated version of Montefeltro et al. (2013), expanded specifically to better resolve basal rhynchosaurs.

- Rhynchosauria
  - Mesosuchus browni
  - - Howesia browni
    - - Eohyosaurus wolvaardti
      - Rhynchosauridae
        - Rhynchosaurus articeps
        - - "Rhynchosaurus" brodiei
          - - - Mariante rhynchosaur
              - Stenaulorhynchus stockleyi
            - - Bentonyx sidensis
              - - Fodonyx spenceri
                - Hyperodapedontinae
                  - Isalorhynchus genovefae
                  - - Teyumbaita sulcognathus
                    - Hyperodapedon spp.
