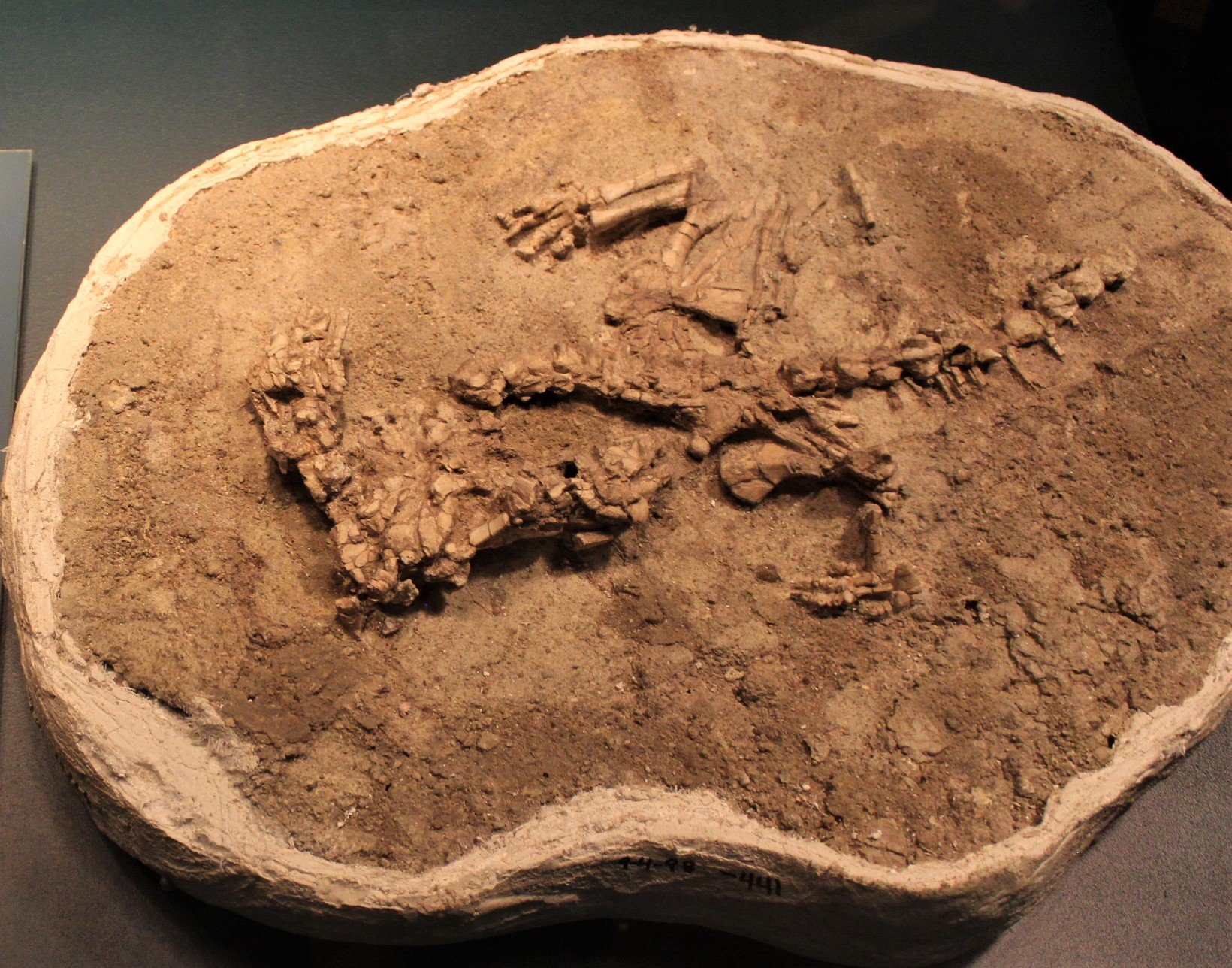
- Skeleton of Isalorhynchus genovefae in the Field Museum of Natural History.

Scientific classification
- Domain: Eukaryota
- Kingdom: Animalia
- Phylum: Chordata
- Class: Reptilia
- Clade: Archosauromorpha
- Order: †Rhynchosauria
- Family: †Rhynchosauridae
- Subfamily: †Hyperodapedontinae
- Genus: †Isalorhynchus; Buffetaut, 1983

Species
- †I. genovefae Buffetaut, 1983 (type)

Synonyms
- Hyperodapedon genovefae Langer et al., 2000

= Isalorhynchus =

Isalorhynchus Temporal range: Carnian

Extinct genus of reptiles

Isalorhynchus is an extinct genus of hyperodapedontine rhynchosaur from the late Triassic period (Carnian stage) of Toliara Province, southwestern Madagascar. It is known from the holotype MDE-R18, a nearly complete maxilla and from other specimens from the same locality, Malio River area. It was found in the Makay Formation (or Isalo II) of the Morondava Basin (or Isalo beds). It was first named by Eric Buffetaut in 1983 and the type species is Isalorhynchus genovefae. The majority of Isalorhynchus specimens are isolated jaw bones, but two nearly complete skeletons were found in 1998. Langer et al., 2000 concluded that Isalorhynchus is a synonym of Hyperodapedon and referred it to a new species of Hyperodapedon. Whatley, 2005 retained this genus as valid with a description of new materials in her PhD thesis. Montefeltro et al., 2010 and Langer et al., 2010 accepted Isalorhynchus as valid genus.

== Phylogeny ==
Isalorhynchus in a cladogram based on Ezcurra et al. (2016):

- Rhynchosauria
  - Noteosuchus
  - Mesosuchus
  - Howesia
  - Eohyosaurus
  - Rhynchosauridae
    - Rhynchosaurus
    - - Stenaulorhynchinae
        - Mariante rhynchosaur
        - Stenaulorhynchus
      - - Langeronyx
        - - Bentonyx
          - - Fodonyx
            - Hyperodapedontinae
              - Isalorhynchus
              - - Teyumbaita
                - Hyperodapedon
