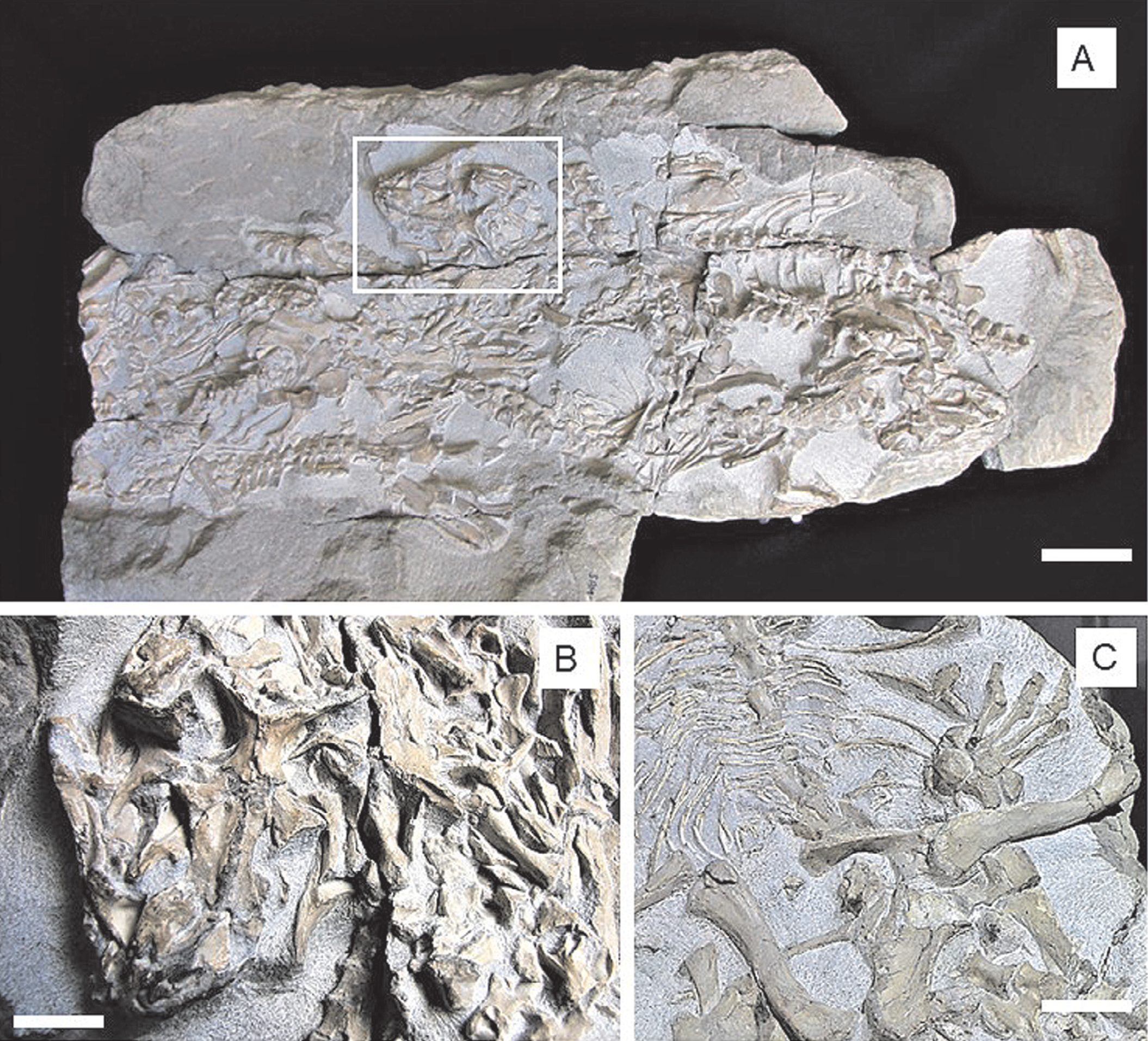
- Bonebed of Mesosuchus specimen SAM-PK-K8051 and Euparkeria

Scientific classification
- Kingdom: Animalia
- Phylum: Chordata
- Class: Reptilia
- Order: †Rhynchosauria
- Genus: †Mesosuchus; Watson, 1912

Species
- †M. browni Watson, 1912 (type)

= Mesosuchus =

Mesosuchus Temporal range: Middle Triassic, 246 Ma

Extinct genus of reptiles from early Middle Triassic of South Africa

Mesosuchus ("middle crocodile") is an extinct genus of basal rhynchosaur from early Middle Triassic (early Anisian stage) deposits of Eastern Cape, South Africa. It is known from the holotype SAM 5882, a partial skeleton, and from the paratypes SAM 6046, SAM 6536, SAM 7416 and SAM 7701 from the Aliwal North Euparkeria site. Mesosuchus is quite small, spanning around 30 cm in length. Mesosuchus was discovered and named by D. M. S. Watson in 1912.

== Discovery and naming ==
Bones of Mesosuchus were first found by David Meredith Seares Watson in 1912 after examining a block of sandstone kept in a private collection of Alfred Brown. This block was found in the middle deposits of the Burgersdorp Formation, in the Cynognathus Assemblage Zone near the town of Aliwal North in the Cape Province of South Africa. The block of sandstone contained many intermingled partial skeletons of several small reptiles, and after careful sorting, Watson considered the unidentified skeletons to belong to a single species, which he named Mesosuchus browni. As the etymology of the name suggests, Watson believed that Mesosuchus was an ancestral crocodile with close affinities to other presumed primitive crocodilians such as Proterosuchus, Erythrosuchus, and Ornithosuchus. However, in 1913, Robert Broom looked more closely at the partial skeletons and immediately determined it to be in fact skeletons of two distinct, though related, species. Broom designated an articulated skeleton with a single external naris and a pair of supposed acrodont premaxillary teeth as the type of Mesosuchus, and the remainder of the specimens were assigned to a new genus and species, Euparkeria capensis.

== Fossil specimens ==
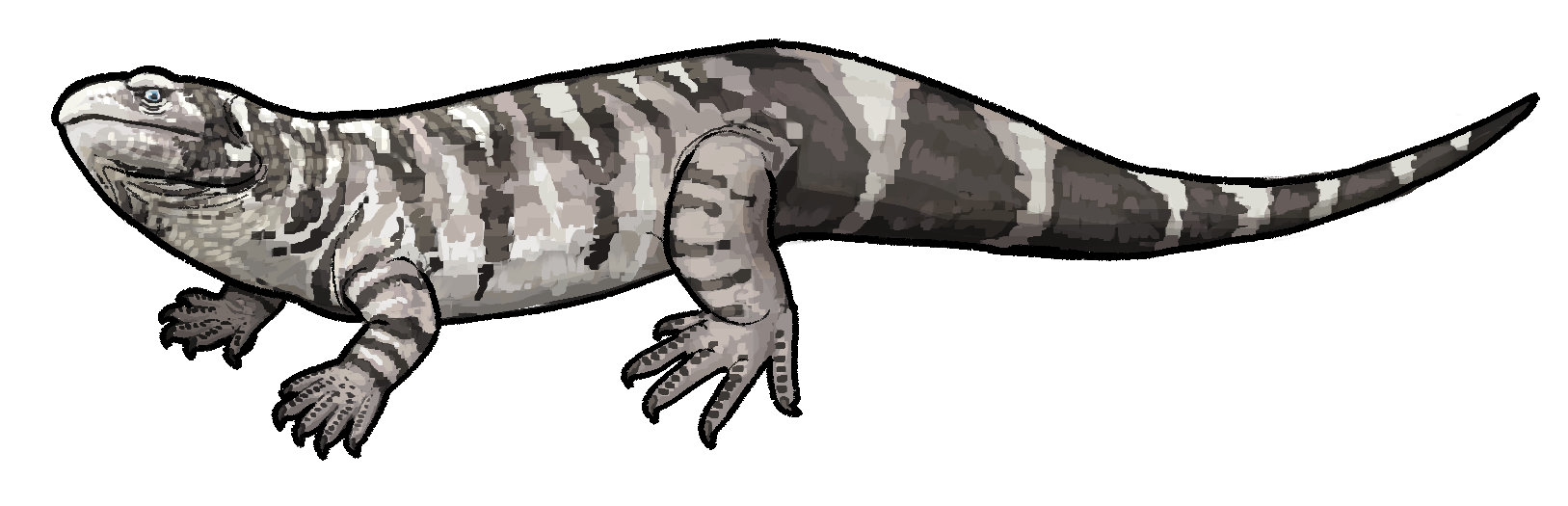
Life restoration of Mesosuchus

SAM 5882, the holotype for Mesosuchus, consists of a partial rostrum, palate, braincase, lower jaws, sections of articulated presacral vertebral column, nine articulated caudal vertebrae, portions of scapula and pelvic girdle, and partial forelimb and hindlimbs.

SAM 6046, one of the paratypes of Mesosuchus, consists of an incomplete right maxilla, an articulated series of the last ten presacrals, both sacrals, and first six caudals, partial forelimbs, left and right pelvic girdles, right hind limb, as well as element of left tarsus.

SAM 6536, another paratype, consists of a virtually complete skull with lower jaws, articulated cervical vertebrae and ribs, dorsal vertebrae and ribs, complete left scapulocoracoid and partial right scapula, interclavicle, clavicles, distal end of left humerus, and gastralia.

SAM 7416, another paratype, consists of an articulated vertebral column composed of the last dozen presacrals, both sacrals and at least the first 15 caudal vertebrae, fragments of right forelimb, pelvic girdle, complete right femur, right crus and partial left crus, and right and left tarsi and pedes.

== Description ==
=== Diagnosis ===
All diagnostic traits of Mesosuchus come from the diagnosis of Mesosuchus browni, as it is the only known species. Most of the autapomorphies used to identify Mesosuchus browni pertain to the skull due to the relatively large amount of skull material known. It was a small rhynchosaurian diapsid with multiple rows of maxillary and dentary teeth, with each row consisting of only a small number of teeth. The two premaxillary teeth are approximately twice the size of the maxillary teeth. The maxillary teeth are inset medially and project below the internal naris. There is also an occlusion between the vomerine teeth and dentary teeth with saddle-shaped vomers that overhang the dorsal side of the premaxillary symphysis. Looking at the spine, the length of the axis neural spine is greater than the length of axis centrum. It also has a craniocaudally narrow neural spine of the third cervical and a prominent midventral groove on the first two caudal centra.

=== Skull ===
The skull of Mesosuchus has a broadly triangular shape with a wide temporal region that tapers sharply along the orbits, expands abruptly at the prefrontals, and then tapers to the blunt rostrum. There is a large, median external naris located at the front of the rostrum that faces dorsally and cranially. The orbits face laterally and slightly cranially. One feature on the skull that can distinguish the Mesosuchus from all other rhynchosaurs, with possible exception of Howesia, is the presence of a beak-like rostrum, formed primarily by huge premaxillary teeth rather than by tapering, edentulous premaxillae.

The palate has a pronounced, sagittally elongated vault that is formed primarily by the vomers. The vomers contact the premaxillae at a level with the maxillary tooth margin towards the tip of the rostrum. However, it does curve strongly dorsally towards the palatines, and so we see the choanae very far above the tooth margin. To withdraw the choana further from the oral cavity, the vomerine and palatine borders of the choana are recessed dorsally.

On the maxilla, there is a distinct notch that contributes most of the border of a dorsal fenestra. It appeared to be the cranialmost of a series of maxillary foramina that extended across the lateral face of the maxilla. This most likely hinted to cutaneous blood vessels and nerves in that area. This notch is hidden by an overlap of the premaxilla by the maxilla.

The postorbital is composed of the anteroventral, posterodorsal, and dorsomedial processes in equal length. The anteroventral process does not come into contact with the ectopterygoid but it does indeed reach farther down the medial side of the jugal. The posterodorsal process forms a great portion of the smooth cranial rim of the upper temporal fenestra and contacts the parietal below the postfrontal.

Information of the lower jaw had to be put together from the pieces of the different SAM fossils as there is not one that had a complete lower jaw. When looking at the different parts however, there are indications of at least six elements present in the lower jaw of the Mesosuchus: dentary, splenial, surangular, angular, prearticular, and articular.

=== Dentition ===
Evident on SAM 5882, 6046, and 6536 was a clear line of separation between the tooth and surrounding bone indicating that the teeth are implanted in the jaw, which went against the previous idea that the marginal teeth of Mesosuchus were ankylosed to the jaws. Although there are indications of deep implantation, it is still uncertain whether the mode of attachment could be described as thecodont. Looking at the maxillary teeth, a circular cross-section is maintained throughout the teeth and the majority are worn out heavily to short, blunt pegs. This suggests that Mesosuchus is in fact an herbivore.

In 1963, M.E. Malan observed an interesting pattern in the positioning of the maxillary and dentary teeth. The middle section, where the medial expansion of the maxilla is wideset, had a zig-zag arrangement of teeth while the first and last four teeth are aligned in a row that is parallel to the maxilla. In the dentary, a simpler arrangement with only a slight zig-zag arrangement. Comparing this feature to Captorhinus aguti, which also possessed a zig-zag pattern of teeth, they hypothesized that Mesosuchus could have had multiple teeth on at least the maxilla. This hypothesis was supported when examining the erosional features on SAM 6536.

== Phylogeny ==
Mesosuchus in a cladogram based on Ezcurra et al. (2016):

- Rhynchosauria
  - Noteosuchus
  - Mesosuchus
  - Howesia
  - Eohyosaurus
  - Rhynchosauridae
    - Rhynchosaurus
    - - Stenaulorhynchinae
        - Mariante rhynchosaur
        - Stenaulorhynchus
      - - Langeronyx
        - - Bentonyx
          - - Fodonyx
            - Hyperodapedontinae
              - Isalorhynchus
              - - Teyumbaita
                - Hyperodapedon
