= Mesodapedon =

Mesodapedon Temporal range: Middle Triassic, Anisian

Scientific classification
- Domain: Eukaryota
- Kingdom: Animalia
- Phylum: Chordata
- Class: Reptilia
- Clade: Archosauromorpha
- Order: †Rhynchosauria
- Family: †Rhynchosauridae
- Subfamily: †Stenaulorhynchinae
- Genus: †Mesodapedon; Chatterjee, 1980

Species
- †M. kuttyi Chatterjee, 1980 (type)

Extinct genus of reptiles

Mesodapedon is an extinct genus of hyperodapedontid rhynchosaur from middle Triassic (Anisian stage) deposits of India. It is known from the holotype ISIR-300 and from the paratype ISIR-301 from the Yerrapalli Formation. It was first named by Sankar Chatterjee in 1980 and the type species is Mesodapedon kuttyi. It is extremely closely related to the Tanzanian Stenaulorhynchus and even was considered to be its synonym.
