= Ammorhynchus =

Ammorhynchus Temporal range: Anisian ~247.2–242.0 Ma

Scientific classification
- Kingdom: Animalia
- Phylum: Chordata
- Class: Reptilia
- Order: †Rhynchosauria
- Family: †Rhynchosauridae
- Subfamily: †Stenaulorhynchinae
- Genus: †Ammorhynchus; Nesbitt & Whatley, 2004

Species
- †A. navajoi Nesbitt & Whatley, 2004 (type)

Extinct genus of reptiles

Ammorhynchus is an extinct genus of hyperodapedontid rhynchosaur from Middle Triassic (Anisian stage) deposits of Navajo County, Arizona. It is known from the holotype MSM 02-153/P4585, a nearly complete left maxilla and from three paratypes (MSM 00-99/P4409, a partial left maxilla; MSM 00-103/P4586, other partial maxilla and MSM 02-145/P4544, dentary fragments) from the same locality. It was found in the Holbrook Member, upper Moenkopi Formation of northern Arizona. It was first named by S. J. Nesbitt and R. L. Whatley in 2004 and the type species is Ammorhynchus navajoi.
