= Teyumbaita =

Teyumbaita Temporal range: Early Norian

Scientific classification
- Kingdom: Animalia
- Phylum: Chordata
- Class: Reptilia
- Order: †Rhynchosauria
- Family: †Rhynchosauridae
- Subfamily: †Hyperodapedontinae
- Genus: †Teyumbaita; Montefeltro, Langer and Schultz, 2010

Species
- †T. sulcognathus (Azevedo & Schultz, 1987) Montefeltro et al., 2010

Synonyms
- Scaphonyx sulcognathus Azevedo & Schultz, 1987 (type)

Extinct genus of reptiles

Teyumbaita is an extinct genus of hyperodapedontine rhynchosaur from the Upper Triassic of southern Brazil. Its fossils were recovered from the early Norian-age Caturrita Formation, one of several fossiliferous formations exposed at Paleorrota Geopark in the state of Rio Grande do Sul. Teyumbaita is likely the youngest valid genus of rhynchosaur, as other members of the group likely died out before the start of the Norian.

Fossils of Teyumbaita include two nearly complete skulls and a partial skull, all of which were discovered in the lower part of the Caturrita Formation. The fossils were first named as Scaphonyx sulcognathus, a species of Scaphonyx. The genus Scaphonyx is now considered to be a nomen dubium, so S. sulcognathus was reassigned to its own genus by Felipe Chinaglia Montefeltro, Max Cardoso Langer and Cesar Leandro Schultz in 2010. This new genus name, Teyumbaita, was constructed from "lizard (teyú) and parrot (mbaitá)" in the Brazilian aborigine Tupi-Guaraní language, and the combinatio nova is Teyumbaita sulcognathus. Fossil material of a second, yet-unnamed species, is known from the Hoyada del Cerro Las Lajas site of the Ischigualasto Formation in Argentina.

The teeth of T. sulcognathus have been found to contain flutes, a feature also known from Hyperodapedon fossils in both India and Brazil.

== Phylogeny ==
Cladogram based on Montefeltro, Langer and Schultz (2010):

- Rhynchosauria
  - Mesosuchus
  - - Howesia
    - Rhynchosauridae
      - Rhynchosaurus
      - - - Rhincossauro de Mariante
          - Stenaulorhynchus
        - - Fodonyx
          - Hyperodapedontinae
            - Isalorhynchus
            - - Hyperodapedon
              - Teyumbaita

== Material ==
Many specimens of T. sulcognathus have been found to date:

- UFRGS-PV-0232T (holotype) – partial skeleton with nearly complete skull
- UFRGS-PV-0298T – partial skeleton and nearly complete skull
- UFRGS-PV-0290T – partial skeleton and skull
- UFRGS-PV-0418T – partial right mandible
- UFRGS-PV-0420T – partial right dentary and postcrania
- UFRGS-PV-0445T – partial maxilla
- MCP-683 – partial left dentary
