= Brasinorhynchus =

Brasinorhynchus Temporal range: Middle Triassic (Ladinian) ~242.0–235.0 Ma

Scientific classification
- Kingdom: Animalia
- Phylum: Chordata
- Class: Reptilia
- Order: †Rhynchosauria
- Family: †Rhynchosauridae
- Subfamily: †Stenaulorhynchinae
- Genus: †Brasinorhynchus; Schultz et al. 2016

Type species
- †Brasinorhynchus mariantensis Schultz et al. 2016

Extinct genus of reptiles

Brasinorhynchus is an extinct genus of derived rhynchosaur known from the late Middle Triassic (Ladinian stage) Santa Maria Formation of Rio Grande do Sul, Brazil. It contains a single species, Brasinorhynchus mariantensis.

== Description ==
B. mariantensis is known from two specimens, including the holotype UFRGS-PV-0168-T, a complete skull, atlas, axis and third neck vertebra and the paratype UFRGS-PV-0315-T, right maxilla and jaw, both housed at the vertebrate paleontology collection of the Universidade Federal do Rio Grande do Sul, Porto Alegre-Brazil. The specimens were collected at the same site, along road RS-240 near the town of Porto Mariante, 28 km east of Venâncio Aires, in the municipality of Bom Retiro do Sul. Since its first description by Langer & Schultz (2000) it became known in the scientific literature as the "Mariante Rhynchosaur" in reference to the town of Porto Mariante. It was finally named as a new genus and species by Cesar Leandro Schultz, Max Cardoso Langer and Felipe Chinaglia Montefeltro in 2016 as B. mariantensis. The generic name Brasinorhynchus comes from Portuguese brasino used for red horses in south Brazil in reference to the red color of the fossils and their resemblance to a horse skull, and from the Greek rhynchos meaning "beak", a common suffix for rhynchosaur genera. The specific name shares its origin with the specimens' old nickname, the "Mariante Rhynchosaur".

B. mariantensis is unique among other known rhynchosaurs by possessing a contact between the prefrontal and postfrontal bones that excludes the frontals from the eye socket. A phylogenetic analysis recovered it in an advanced position with the Stenaulorhynchinae, as the sister taxon of Stenaulorhynchus stockleyi from the late Anisian of Manda beds, Tanzania. B. mariantensis occurs in the Mariante 1 locality that yielded isolated dicynodont remains, which is near Mariante 2 that yielded more complete material referable to Dinodontosaurus, both of which belong to the Alemoa Member beds of the formation. This puts B. mariantensis in the Dinodontosaurus Assemblage Zone which is of Ladinian age, thus making it the youngest known stenaulorhynchine.
