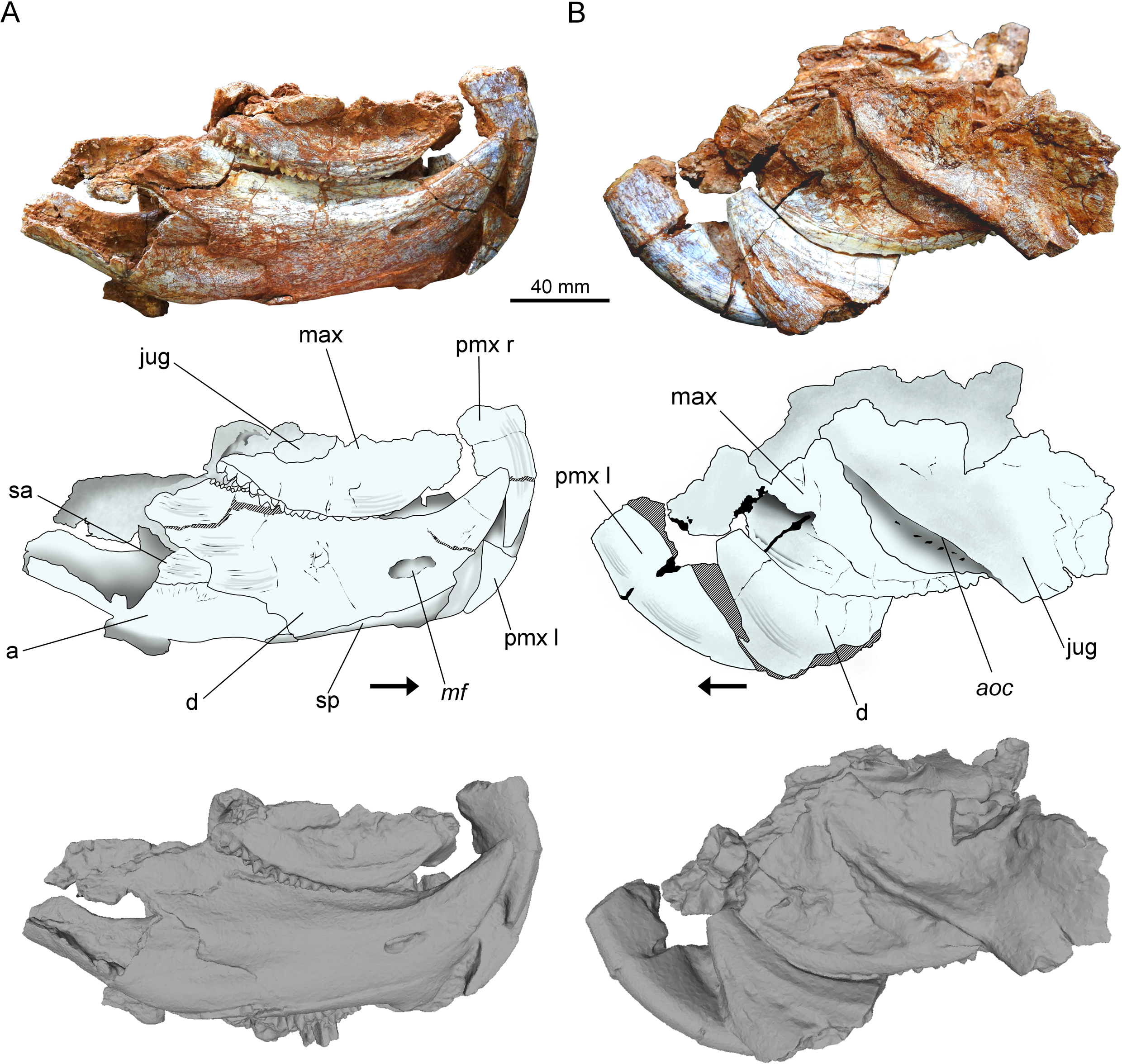
- Holotype skull

Scientific classification
- Kingdom: Animalia
- Phylum: Chordata
- Class: Reptilia
- Order: †Rhynchosauria
- Family: †Rhynchosauridae
- Subfamily: †Hyperodapedontinae
- Genus: †Isodapedon; Schiefelbein et al., 2026
- Species: †I. varzealis

Binomial name
- †Isodapedon varzealis Schiefelbein et al., 2026

= Isodapedon =

Isodapedon Temporal range: Late Triassic, late Carnian

Genus of rhynchosaur reptiles

Isodapedon is an extinct genus of rhynchosaurian reptile known from the Late Triassic (Carnian age) Santa Maria Formation of Brazil. The genus contains a single species, Isodapedon varzealis, known from a partial skull.

== Discovery and naming ==
Isodapedon type locality at Várzea do Agudo site, Brazil

The Isodapedon fossil material was discovered in the Várzea do Agudo site, representing outcrops of the Santa Maria Formation (Candelária Sequence of the Santa Maria Supersequence), about 2 kilometres (1.2 mi) west of Agudo, Rio Grande do Sul, in southern Brazil. These layers are referable to the Exaeretodon Subzone of the Hyperodapedon Assemblage Zone (AZ). It was subsequently prepared and accessioned in the collections of the Centro de Apoio à Pesquisa Paleontológica da Quarta Colônia at the Federal University of Santa Maria (UFSM) as specimen CAPPA/UFSM 0371. The specimen consists of a partial skull occluded with much of the lower jaw.

In 2026, Jeung Hee Schiefelbein and colleagues described Isodapedon varzealis as a new genus and species of rhynchosaur based on these fossil remains, establishing CAPPA/UFSM 037 as the holotype specimen. The generic name, Isodapedon, combines the Ancient Greek words ἴσος (ísos), meaning 'about the same' or 'equal', and Ancient Greek: δάπεδον dápedon, meaning 'pavement'. This references the tooth-bearing surfaces of the maxilla, which are equally wide. The specific name, varzealis, references Várzea do Agudo, the locality from which the holotype was collected.

Several fragmentary tooth-bearing bones from other localities in the Candelária Sequence may also belong to I. varzealis, given their symmetric tooth arrangements shared with the I. varzealis holotype.

== Description ==
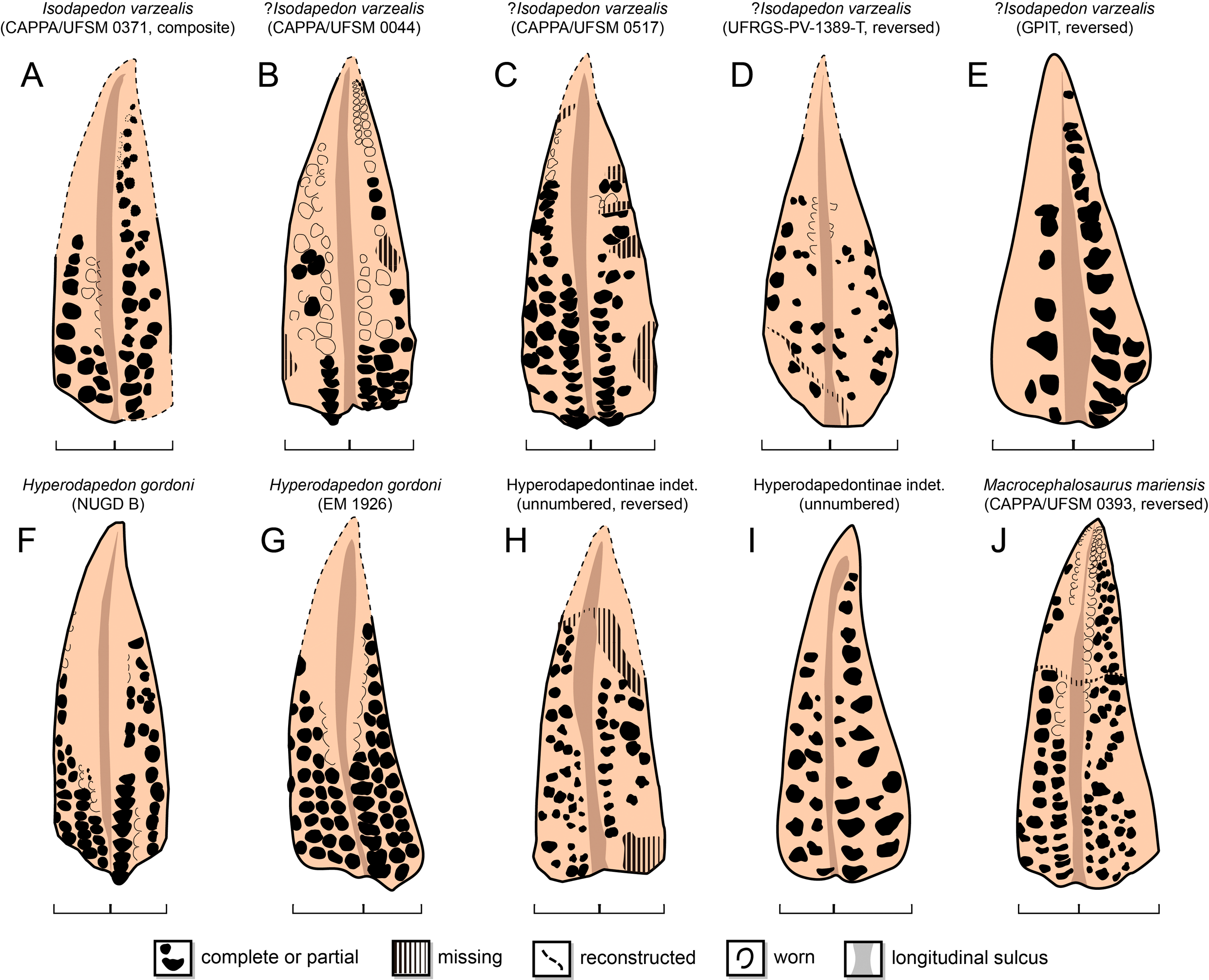
Hyperodapedontinae maxillae: A–E are referred to Isodapedon, and G, I, and J have an asymmetric morphology

As a rhynchosaur, Isodapedon was an herbivorous reptile with a specialized jaw made up of a protruding, toothless beak-like structure formed by the premaxillae. The maxillae further back in the skull bear dental batteries with dense fields of multiple tooth rows. In Isodapedon, the ventral (bottom) surface of the maxillae on both sides of the skull is divided in half from front to back by a sulcus (groove). On either side of this sulcus are three rows of teeth, characterizing the symmetric tooth arrangement for which the genus was named. Most rhynchosaurids, in contrast, have asymmetrical tooth-bearing regions, with one side broader than the other or bearing more tooth rows. Like other Late Triassic rhynchosaurs, the skull is subtriangular when seen from the top or bottom, and is wider than long.

== Classification ==
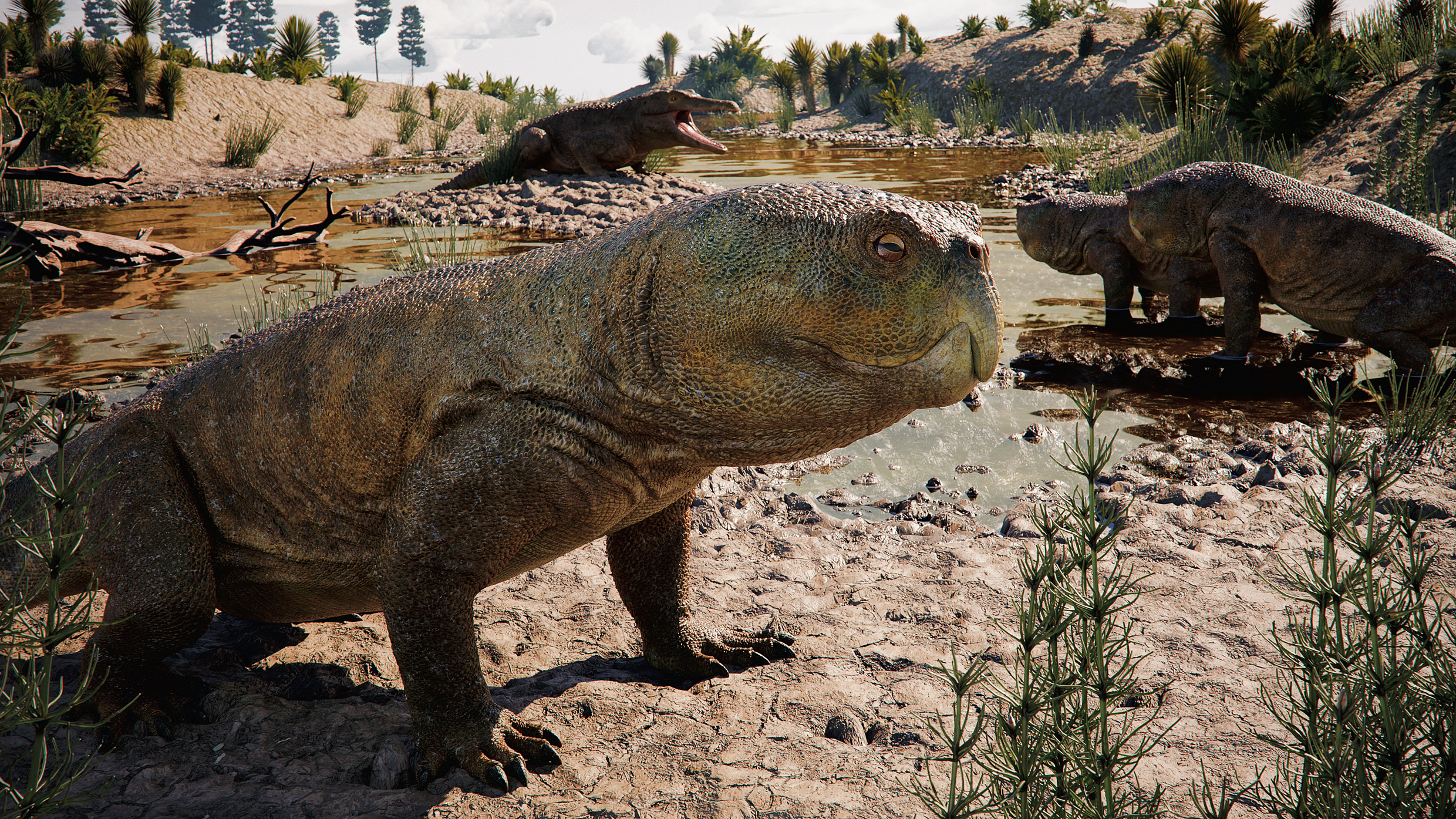
Restoration of three Isodapedon individuals (foreground and midground) and a proterochampsid (background), both components of the Hyperodapedon AZ

To test the affinities and relationships of Isodapedon, Schiefelbein and colleagues (2026) included it in an updated version of the phylogenetic matrix of Fitch et al. (2023). As in the 2023 analysis, the 2026 results recovered the genus Hyperodapedon as paraphyletic, as the species traditionally assigned to it do not form a single clade. Isodapedon was recovered as the sister taxon to Hyperodapedon gordoni, the type species of Hyperodapedon and the only species definitively belonging to it. These results are displayed in the cladogram below:

- Rhynchosauria
  - Mesosuchus browni
  - - Howesia browni
    - - Eohyosaurus wolvaardti
      - Rhynchosauridae
        - Rhynchosaurus articeps
        - - Stenaulorhynchinae
          - Hyperodapedontidae
            - Langeronyx brodiei
            - - Fodonyx spenceri
              - Hyperodapedontinae
                - Isalorhynchus genovefae
                - - - Beesiiwo cooowuse
                    - Oryctorhynchus bairdi
                  - - - Hyperodapedon gordoni
                      - Isodapedon varzealis
                    - - 'Zimbabwe form'
                      - Paradapedon huxleyi
                      - - "Hyperodapedon" tikiensis
                        - - "Hyperodapedon" sanjuanensis
                          - - Macrocephalosaurus mariensis
                            - - Supradapedon stockleyi
                              - - "Hyperodapedon" huenei
                                - Teyumbaita sulcognathus

== Paleoenvironment ==
Isodapedon is known from the 'Várzea do Agudo site' of the Santa Maria Formation, which dates to the latest Carnian age of the late Triassic period. Various other archosauromorphs are also known from this locality, including dinosaurs (Bagualosaurus, Pampadromaeus, and indeterminate specimens), the ornithosuchid pseudosuchian (crocodile-line archosaur) Dynamosuchus, and the proterochampsid Stenoscelida. Some bones referred to "Hyperodapedon sp." have been mentioned but not described in depth.
