= Macrocephalosaurus =

Macrocephalosaurus Temporal range: Late Triassic (Carnian), ~231–227 Ma
- UFRGS-PV-0149T, a skull of M. (or H.) mariensis

Scientific classification
- Kingdom: Animalia
- Phylum: Chordata
- Class: Reptilia
- Order: †Rhynchosauria
- Family: †Rhynchosauridae
- Subfamily: †Hyperodapedontinae
- Genus: †Macrocephalosaurus; Tupi Caldas, 1933

Type species
- †Macrocephalosaurus mariensis Tupi Caldas 1933

Species
- †M. mariensis Tupi Caldas, 1933 (type)

Extinct genus of reptiles

Macrocephalosaurus is a genus of rhynchosaurs (beaked, archosaur-like reptiles) from the Late Triassic period (Carnian stage) of southern Brazil. It contains a single species, Macrocephalosaurus mariensis. Although usually synonymized with Hyperodapedon (as the species Hyperodapedon mariensis), some cladistic analyses have called this synonymy into question.

== Classification ==
The type species of Macrocephalosaurus, M. mariensis, was described in 1933 by Jaci Antonio Louzada Tupi Caldas on the basis of MCN 1867, a complete specimen from the upper member of the Santa Maria Formation in Rio Grande Do Sul State, southern Brazil. The skeleton was transferred to another museum in the mid-1950s, and as of 1998 only the skull and front part of the torso have been recovered; the rest of the skeleton is presumed lost. Langer (1996, 1998) regarded Macrocephalosaurus mariensis as a probable junior synonym of Hyperodapedon huxleyi, synonymizing Macrocephalosaurus with Hyperodapedon.

Nevertheless, Langer and Schultz (2000) listed M. mariensis as a valid species within Hyperodapedon, as H. mariensis. Mukherjee and Ray (2014) followed this interpretation. In their cladistic analysis of the newly described taxon Beesiiwo, Fitch et al. (2023) recovered Macrocephalosaurus as more closely related to Supradapedon and Teyumbaita rather than Hyperodapedon gordoni (the type species of Hyperodapedon) or Oryctorhynchus. As a result, they recommended the revalidation of Macrocephalosaurus.

The following cladogram is based on the phylogenetic analysis of Hyperodapedontinae by Mukherjee & Ray (2014):

- Hyperodapedontinae
  - Isalorhynchus genovefae
  - - Teyumbaita sulcognathus
    - Hyperodapedon
      - H. huenei
      - - - H. mariensis (Macrocephalosaurus)
          - H. sanjuanensis
          - H. sp from Wolfville (Oryctorhynchus)
        - - H. sp from India
          - - H. huxleyi (Paradapedon)
            - - H. gordoni
              - - H. sp from Wyoming (Beesiiwo)
                - H. sp from Zimbabwe
                - H. tikiensis
                - Supradapedon stockleyi

Valid species that were first assigned to Scaphonyx.

The following cladogram is based on the phylogenetic analysis by Fitch et al. (2023):

- - Isalorhynchus genovefae
  - Hyperodapedontinae
    - - Beesiiwo cooowuse
      - Oryctorhynchus bairdi
    - - Hyperodapedon gordoni
      - - "Zimbabwe Form"
        - - Paradapedon huxleyi
          - - - "Scaphonyx" sanjuanensis
              - Macrocephalosaurus mariensis
            - - "Hyperodapedon" tikiensis
              - - Supradapedon stockleyi
                - - "Hyperodapedon" huenei
                  - Teyumbaita sulcognathus
