= Carnian pluvial episode =

Major climatic change and biotic turnover during the Triassic

Triassic graphical timeline
← / Triassic–Jurassic extinction event; ← / Scleractinian corals & calcified sponges; ← / Carnian pluvial episode; ← / Manicouagan impact; ← / Coals return; ← / Full recovery of woody trees; ← / Smithian–Spathian boundary event; ← / Permian-Triassic extinction event
Subdivision of the Triassic according to the ICS, as of 2024. Vertical axis scale: Millions of years ago

The Carnian pluvial episode (CPE), often called the Carnian pluvial event, was a period of major change in global climate that coincided with significant changes in Earth's biota both in the sea and on land. It occurred during the latter part of the Carnian Stage, the first subdivision of the Late Triassic Epoch, and lasted for perhaps 1–2 million years (around 234–232 million years ago). Volcanic activity off the coast of North America led to global warming and increased rainfall on land, alongside a reduction of carbonate platforms in the oceans. Pluvial means "of or relating to rain; characterized by much rain, rainy".

The CPE corresponds to a significant episode in the evolution and diversification of many taxa that are important today. The earliest dinosaurs (which include the ancestors of birds), lepidosaurs (the ancestors of modern-day lizards, snakes, and the tuatara) and potentially mammaliaforms (ancestors of mammals) all diversified during the event. In the marine realm it saw the first appearance among the microplankton of coccoliths and dinoflagellates, with the latter linked to the rapid diversification of scleractinian corals through the establishment of symbiotic zooxanthellae within them. The CPE also saw the extinction of many aquatic invertebrate species, especially among ammonoids, bryozoans, and crinoids.

Evidence for the CPE is observed in Carnian strata worldwide and in sediments of both terrestrial and marine environments. On land, the prevailing arid climate across much of the supercontinent Pangea shifted briefly to a hotter and more humid climate, with a significant increase in rainfall and runoff. In the oceans, carbonate minerals such as limestone saw reduced deposition, leaving mud-rich layers as prominent geological markers. Carbonate disruption may reflect the extinction of many carbonate-forming organisms, but may also be due to a rise in the carbonate compensation depth, below which most carbonate shells dissolve and leave few carbonate particles on the ocean floor to form sediments.

Climate change during the Carnian pluvial event is reflected in chemical changes in Carnian strata across the CPE. Major disruption to the carbon cycle and other natural systems show that global warming was prevalent at the time. This climate change was most likely linked to the eruption of extensive flood basalts and volcanic CO2 offgassing as the Wrangellia Terrane was accreted onto the northwestern end of the North American Plate.

== History and nomenclature ==
Environmental disturbance and high extinction rates were observed for sediments of the Carnian stage long before a global climate perturbation was proposed. Schlager & Schöllnberger (1974) drew attention to a dark siliciclastic layer which abruptly interrupted a long period of carbonate deposition in the Northern Limestone Alps. They termed this stratigraphic "wende" (turning point) the Reingrabener Wende, and it has also been called the Reingraben event or Raibl event. Several Carnian terrestrial formations (namely the Schilfsandstein of Germany and various members of the United Kingdom's Mercia Mudstone Group) are intervals of river sediments enriched with kaolinitic clay and plant debris, despite having been deposited between more arid strata. Humidity-adapted palynomorphs in New Brunswick, karst topography in the U.K., and a carbon isotope excursion in Israel were all reported for the middle of the Carnian prior to 1989. The Julian-Tuvalian boundary experienced high extinction rates among many marine invertebrates, while an extinction among land vertebrates was suggested to occur in the late Carnian.

In 1989, Michael J. Simms and Alastair H. Ruffell combined these disparate observations into a new hypothesis, pointing to an episode of increased rainfall synchronous with significant ecological turnover in the mid-Carnian. The paper was inspired by a conversation between Simms and Ruffell, on 10 November 1987 at Birmingham University, that connected Ruffell's research on lithological changes in the Mercia Mudstone Group to Simms's research on crinoid extinction. A key aspect of their hypothesis was that the evidence used to demonstrate the climate change was entirely independent of the evidence for biotic change; fossils were not used in any way to infer climate change. Their hypothesized climatic disturbance, which they named the Carnian pluvial episode, was tentatively considered to be a result of oceanic and/or volcanic instability related to the early rifting of Pangea, but at that time direct evidence of this possibility was lacking.

Simms and Ruffell published several more papers in subsequent years, but their hypothesis was not widely accepted. A strong critique by Visscher et al. (1994) argued that aridity-adapted pollen stayed abundant through the entire Carnian of Germany, suggesting that the Schilfsandstein was simply indicative of an invading river system rather than widespread climate change. Their critique also coined the term "Carnian pluvial event", which would eventually become among the most widespread names for the climatic disturbance.

The obscurity of Simms and Ruffell's hypothesis began to dissipate in the late 2000s, as further support accumulated from studies on Carnian sites in Italy. Interest in the hypothesis was greatly enhanced by a 2008 meeting and workshop on Triassic climate at the Museum of Nature South Tyrol in Bolzano, Italy. However, even as the global nature of the CPE became increasingly accepted, its ultimate cause was still hotly debated going into the 2010s. Even its nomenclature was not agreed upon, with various authors applying names such as the middle Carnian wet intermezzo, Carnian humid episode, Carnian pluvial phase, and Carnian crisis. Carbon and osmium isotope records published over the coming years supported a strong link between the Carnian climate disturbances and the Wrangellia large igneous province, but many questions remain unanswered. A geological workshop focusing on the CPE met in 2018 at the Hanse-Wissenschaftskolleg (HWK) Institute for Advanced Study in Delmenhorst, Germany. The workshop was intended to spur further research on the mechanisms, impact and stratigraphy of the CPE, as well as its relevance for understanding modern climate change. It also attempted to standardize the nomenclature of the CPE; rejecting descriptors such as "event" (typically applied to geological processes under a million years in duration) or "middle Carnian" (a nebulous term with no equivalent geological substage).

== Environmental disruption ==
=== Climate during the Carnian pluvial episode ===
The Carnian pluvial episode introduced markedly more humid conditions across the globe, interrupting the otherwise arid climate of the Late Triassic period. This humidity was related to increased rainfall during the CPE, evidenced by:

- Siliciclastic (high silica-content) sediment in sedimentary basins, reflecting a high level of continental weathering and runoff;
- Significant karst conduits (caves) in Palaeozoic limestone inliers beneath the Late Triassic terrestrial unconformity. The topographic context of these caves is consistent with a Carnian age, supported by radiometric dates from speleothems (stalagmites) in two of these caves. However, some researchers instead favour a Rhaetian age for formation and filling of the caves based on the localised occurrence of microfossils.
- The development of histic and spodic palaeosols, fossil soils which are typical of a tropical humid climate with more water entering through precipitation than leaving through evapotranspiration;
- Hygrophytic palynological (fossil pollen) assemblages that reflect vegetation more adapted to a humid climate;
- The widespread presence of amber.

This usually wet climate of the CPE was periodically interrupted by drier climates typical of the rest of the Late Triassic period. One climate simulation argues that the interior of Pangaea actually became drier during the CPE, even as its eastern margin and high-latitude regions became rainier. The onset of the episode may have been very rapid (~15,800 years), amplified by carbon cycle feedback effects.

==== Global warming ====
Global warming was also prevalent during the Carnian pluvial event. This is evidenced by oxygen isotope analyses performed on conodont apatite from the CPE, which show an approximately 1.5‰ negative shift in the stable isotope δ^{18}O. This result suggests global warming of at least 3–4 °C during the CPE and/or a change in seawater salinity. Wider sampling supports warming on the order of 4–8°C. This warming was almost certainly related to extensive volcanic activity at the time, evidenced by carbon isotope trends across the CPE. This volcanic activity was in turn probably related to the formation of the Wrangellia Large igneous province around the same time, which created vast quantities of igneous (volcanic) rocks that were accreted onto the northwest end of the North American Plate (now the Wrangell Mountains, Alaska, and an estimated 6km thick layer underlying most of Vancouver Island).

==== Increased weathering ====
Chemical weathering intensified during the CPE, according to Lithium isotopes in volcanic lake ash in North China. Prior to the event, lithium is found in low concentrations, mostly sourced from airborne ash in a cool and dry climate. During the CPE, river input becomes a greater influence on the system, with the hot, wet climate increasing the amount of lithium weathering out of ash beds on land. Weathering was also seen in prehistoric coastal Europe, enhancing runoff of terrestrial sediments responsible for local mud-rich marine layers. High rates of weathering continued even after the earth returned to a drier climate, suggesting that the CPE eroded enough sediment in the region to expose basement rock.

=== Effects on carbonate platforms ===
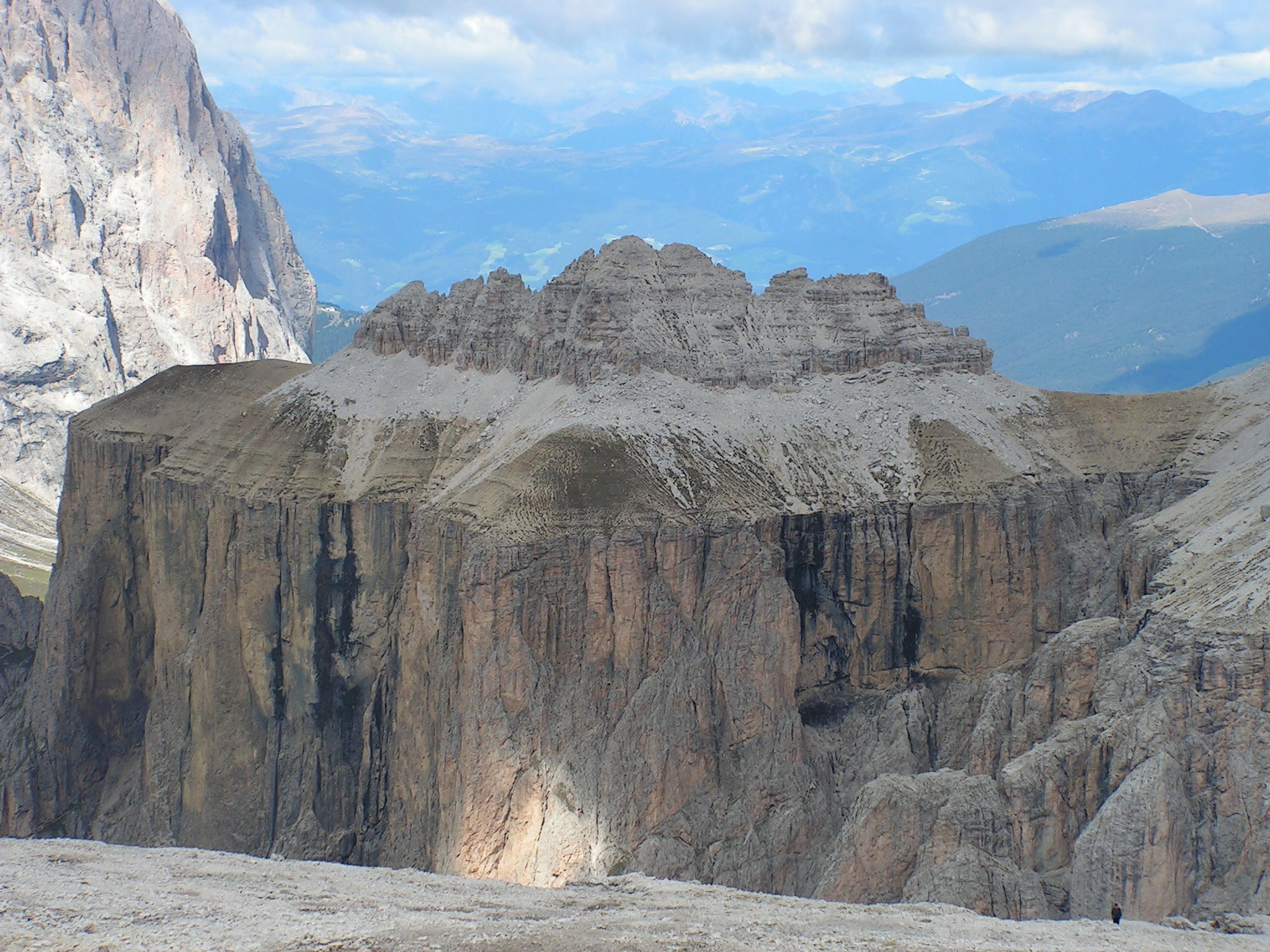
A peak in the Sella Group of the Italian Dolomites. The sloped layer represents the Carnian Pluvial Episode, a time when carbonate platforms (vertical limestone cliffs) were interrupted by an influx of more easily eroded shale and mudstone.

The onset of the CPE marks a sharp change in the shape and composition of carbonate platforms across the entire Tethys Ocean, which extended from Central Europe to East Asia. The early Carnian was characterized by high-relief, mainly isolated, small carbonate platforms surrounded by steep slopes. During the CPE, these were replaced by low-relief carbonate platforms with low-angle slopes (i.e., ramps). This turnover is related to a major change in the biological community responsible for calcium carbonate precipitation (in other words, the "carbonate factory"). High-relief platforms relied on a highly-productive biological community of carbonate-secreting microbes. When microbial carbonate declined during the CPE, a less productive animal-dominated carbonate community was left to pick of the slack, leaving skeletal grains (shell fragments) and ooids as the primary component of limestone.

In many regions, rain and river activity on land led to an increased flow of sand, silt, mud, and clay into the ocean. These terrestrial siliciclastic sediments form distinct, easily-eroded layers in areas otherwise dominated by carbonate. Carbonate deposition is eliminated altogether in rare deep marine sediments found in Southern Italy. The carbonate compensation depth (the minimum depth where calcium carbonate dissolves completely) was probably shallower during the CPE than before or after. In Turkey, which was near the equator during the Carnian, the demise of carbonate platforms was delayed compared to more northerly seas.

In the South China block, the demise of carbonate platforms is coupled with the deposition of sediments typical of anoxic environments (black shales). Thanks to low deep-water oxygen levels, animal remains were often well-preserved in sedimentary deposits called lagerstätten. These lagerstätten are rich in crinoids and reptiles such as ichthyosaurs. Some of the fossil-rich layers overlap with the Carnian Pluvial Episode, such as the transition from the Zhuganpo to Xiaowa formations. Nevertheless, black shales are not as abundant in the CPE compared to other extinctions (which typically coincide with oceanic anoxic events).

There is some evidence for seabed euxinia (no oxygen and high toxic sulfide concentrations) during the CPE. Limestones are enriched in manganese ions near the top of the Zhuganpo Formation. Manganese ions are concentrated and soluble in deep euxinic waters, but precipitate in carbonates at the base of the oxygenated zone. Increasing manganese concentrations indicate a narrowing of the oxygenated zone and a corresponding expansion of euxinic water.

== Effect on life ==
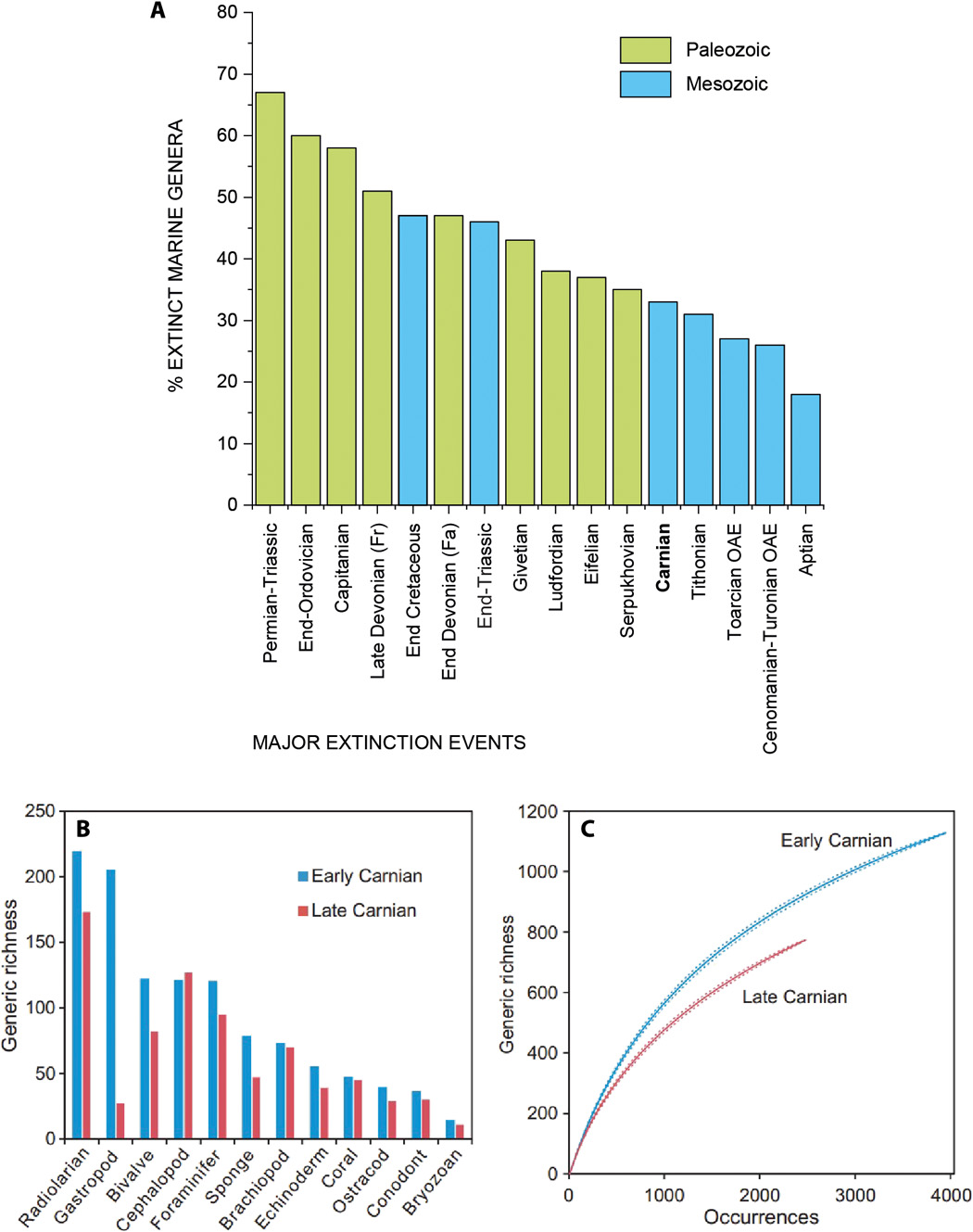
Marine extinctions

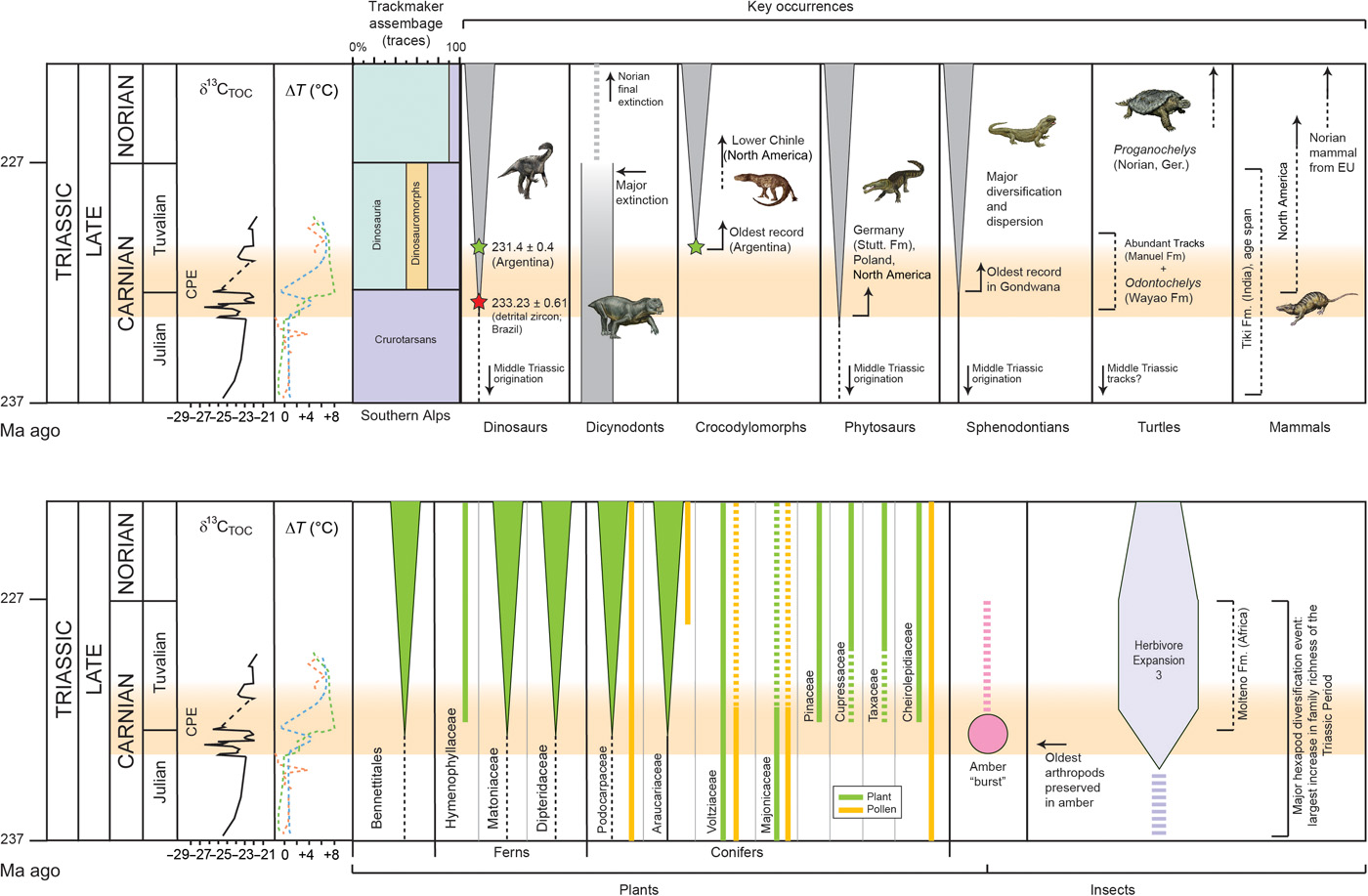
Some of the major biological changes

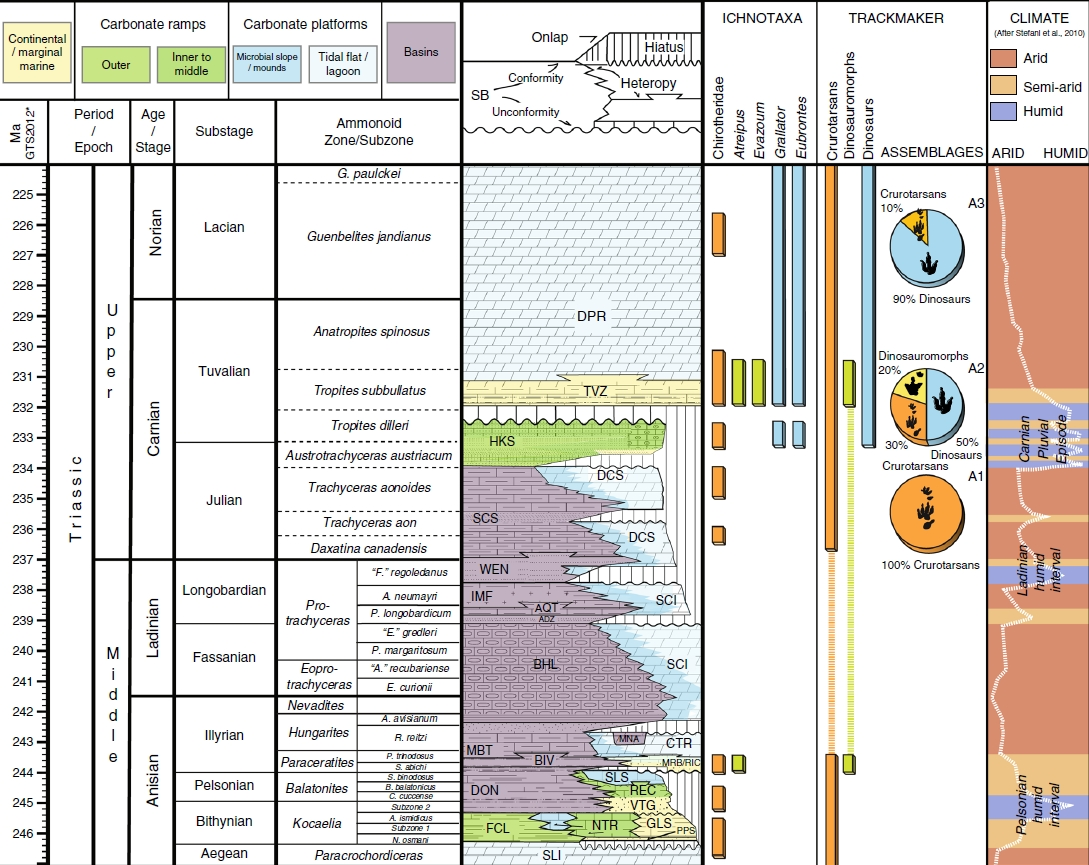
Tetrapod footprints mapped against Alpine stratigraphy, biozones, and climate in the Triassic

Conodonts, ammonoids, crinoids, bryozoa and green algae experienced high extinction rates during the CPE. Other organisms radiated and diversified during the interval, such as dinosaurs, calcareous nannofossils, corals and conifers.

=== Dinosaurs ===
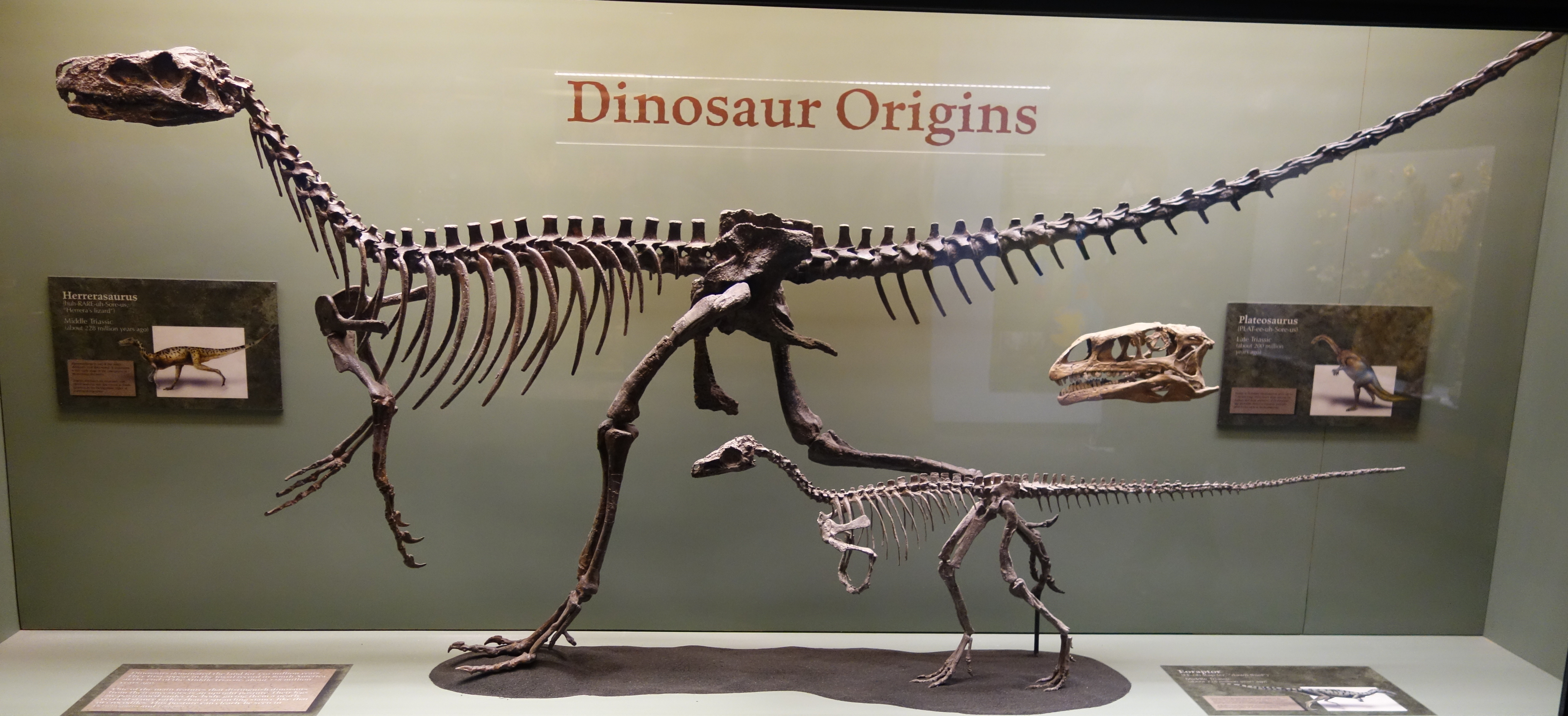
Herrerasaurus (top) and Eoraptor (bottom) were among the earliest well-preserved dinosaurs. They are from the Ischigualasto Formation of Argentina, deposited only a few million years after the CPE.

Some studies interpret the CPE as a key geobiological event allowing dinosaurs to diversify. The oldest well-constrained geological units with dinosaur fossils are the Santa Maria Formation of Brazil and the Ischigualasto Formation of Argentina. The latter's earliest dinosaur-bearing layers are radiometrically dated back to 230.3 to 231.4 million years ago. This is similar to early minimum age estimates for the CPE (≈230.9 million years ago). More recent studies place the CPE a few million years earlier, near the start of the underlying Los Rastros Formation.

Comparisons of tetrapod ichnofossils (footprints) from before, during, and after the CPE suggest an explosive increase in dinosaur abundance due to the Carnian humid phase. However, while avemetatarsalian diversity, diversification rate, and size disparity does increase through the Carnian, it increases faster in the Ladinian and Norian, suggesting that the CPE was not a major influence on the rise of dinosaurs. Precipitation has no apparent correlation with dinosaur diversity across the Late Triassic, with latitude as a better proxy instead.

=== Other tetrapods ===
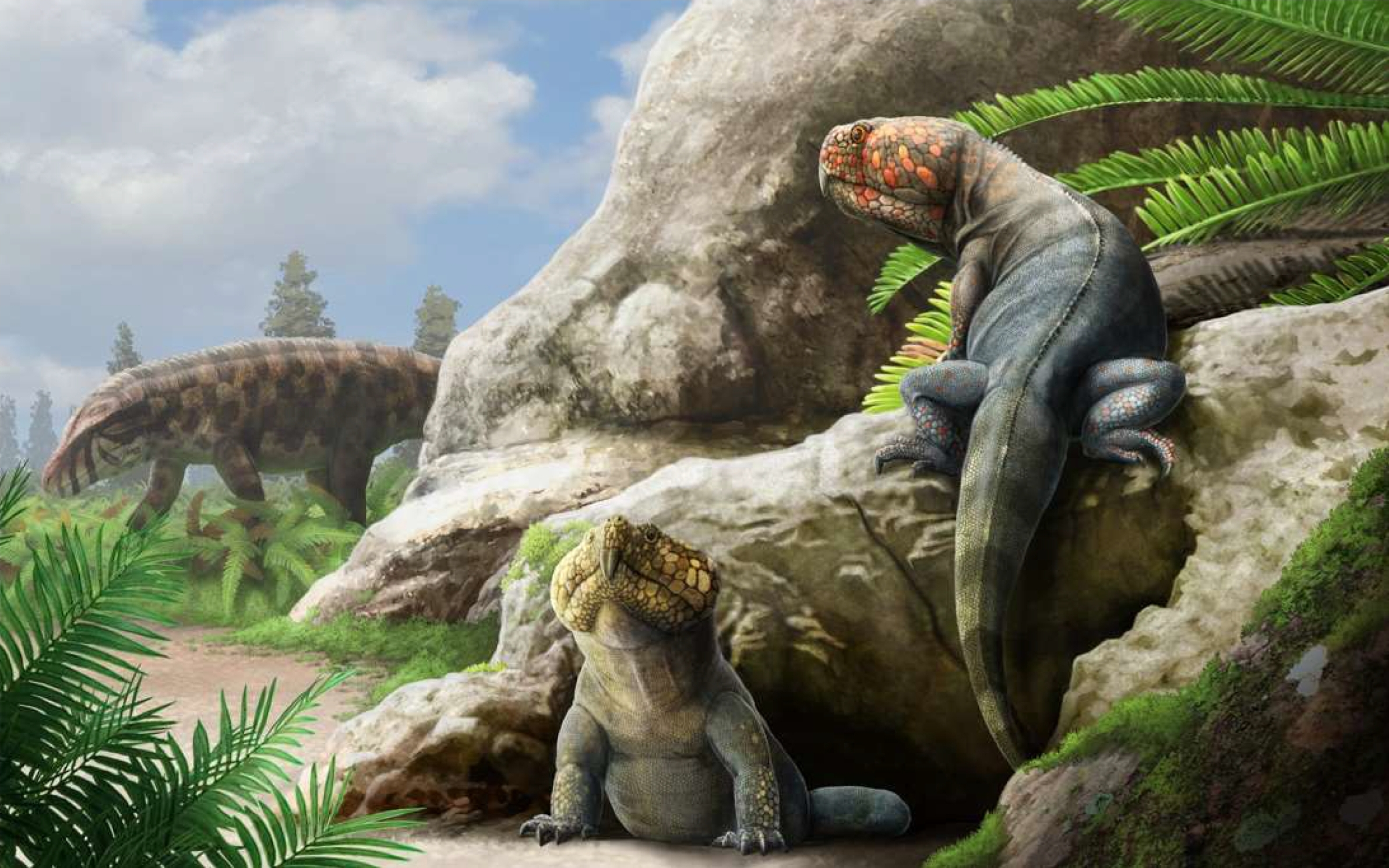
The CPE may have wiped out generalized rhynchosaurs, leaving only the specialized hyperodapedontine rhynchosaurs (such as Beesiiwo, pictured), which were vulnerable to later extinctions.

The CPE had a profound effect on the diversity and morphological disparity (shape variety) of herbivorous tetrapods. This is exemplified in rhynchosaurs, a group of reptiles with strong shearing and grinding jaws. Rhynchosaur lineages which were common in the Middle Triassic went extinct, leaving only the specialized hyperodapedontines as representatives of the group. Immediately after the CPE, hyperodapedontines were widespread and abundant in the late Carnian world, suggesting that they benefited from the climate fluctuations or floral turnover. Hyperodapedontine abundance was not sustained for long, and they too would die out in the early Norian. By cutting rhynchosaurs off from more generalized niches, the CPE would have reduced their versatility and increased their long-term vulnerability to extinction. Similar trends are observed in dicynodonts, though they would survive until much later in the Triassic. Conversely, more versatile and generalist herbivores such as aetosaurs and sauropodomorph dinosaurs would diversify after the CPE.

Some studies argued that mammals originated during the CPE. More precisely, "mammal" refers to mammaliaforms (extremely mammal-like cynodonts, appearing prior to the common ancestor of modern mammals). The oldest claimed mammaliaforms are Tikitherium (from India) and Adelobasileus (from Texas). However, both are likely younger than the Carnian: Tikitherium appears to be a misidentified Cenozoic shrew, while Adelobasileus is "no older than 225 Ma". Mammaliaforms and their closest relatives, the buck-toothed tritylodonts, together make up the group Mammaliamorpha. Mammaliamorphs were the first fully endothermic cynodonts, and their ancestry can be traced back to the CPE. In the subsequent Norian stage, unambiguous mammaliaforms appeared on the scene, with morganucodonts, haramiyids, and other forms throughout Europe and Greenland.

Rhynchocephalians (relatives of the modern tuatara) achieved a worldwide distribution by the end of the Carnian. Crocodylomorphs, phytosaurs, and turtles also began to diversify after the CPE. There is some ambiguity regarding a cause-and-effect relationship between the CPE and terrestrial diversification events, many of which were prolonged processes through the Middle and Late Triassic.

=== Plants ===
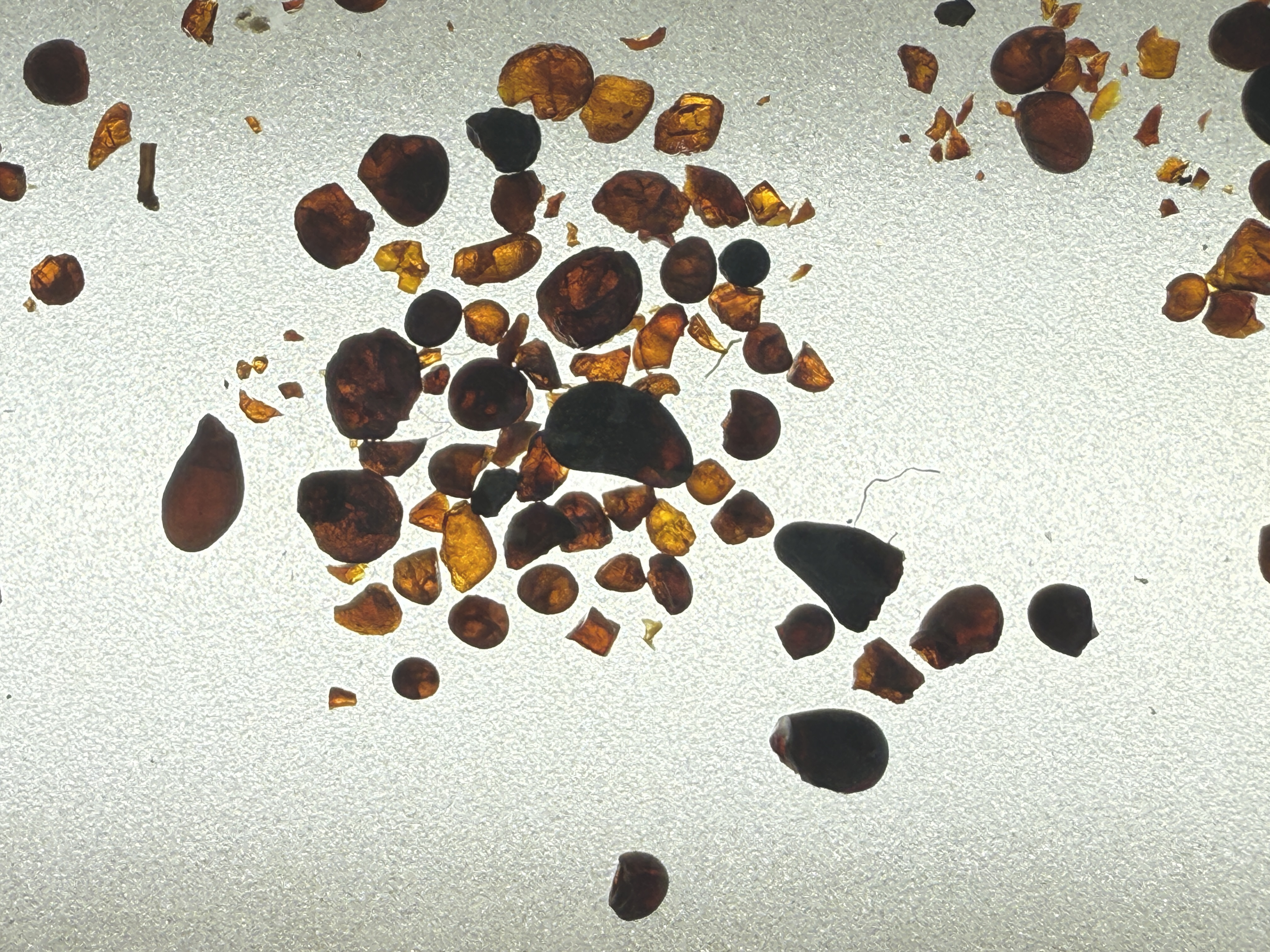
Triassic amber from Italy

Conifers, ferns, and the now-extinct bennettitaleans all diversified greatly during and after the CPE, establishing themselves as mainstays of Mesozoic flora. Most regions show a higher proportion of hygrophytic (moisture-loving) plants during the episode compared to earlier parts of the Triassic. Spores of ferns and freshwater algae are frequently abundant in palynological samples. The Carnian saw the reestablishment of large inland lakes and peat swamps, ending the Early-Middle Triassic "coal gap" caused by the Permian-Triassic mass extinction. Increased plant growth and coal burial probably helped to draw down CO_{2}, returning the atmosphere to a more normal state after the CPE.

Though tiny amber traces can be found in rocks as old as the Carboniferous, the earliest widespread amber deposits date back to the CPE. Carnian amber droplets from Italian paleosols are the oldest amber deposits known to preserve arthropods and microorganisms. Amber would not reappear in the fossil record until the Late Jurassic, though it would take until the Early Cretaceous for amber to occur in concentrations equivalent to or exceeding Carnian amber.

=== Marine life ===
Radiolarians increased in their diversity, likely as a result of increased continental weathering amidst the warmth and humidity of the CPE. The first planktonic calcifiers occurred just after the CPE and might have been calcareous dinocysts, i.e., calcareous cysts of dinoflagellates. Foraminifera saw no global extinction across the CPE, apart from a localized decline in the Paleotethys.

Coastal ostracod communities in Hungary experienced major changes across the CPE. Through Julian 2, land-based sediments isolated and filled in marine basins, replacing carbonate-specialists such as bairdiids and healdiids with Bektasia, a platycopid tolerant of shallow siliciclastic seas. Further shallowing across the Julian-Tuvalian boundary left only a few aberrant limnocytherids (Renngartenella, Simeonella) and cytherurids (Kerocythere) which could manage severe salinity fluctuations in the restricted coastal basins. Bairdiids returned in force at the end of the crisis when the basins deepened, reacquiring carbonate and better ventilation.

== Possible causes and influences ==
=== Eruption of Wrangellia flood basalts ===
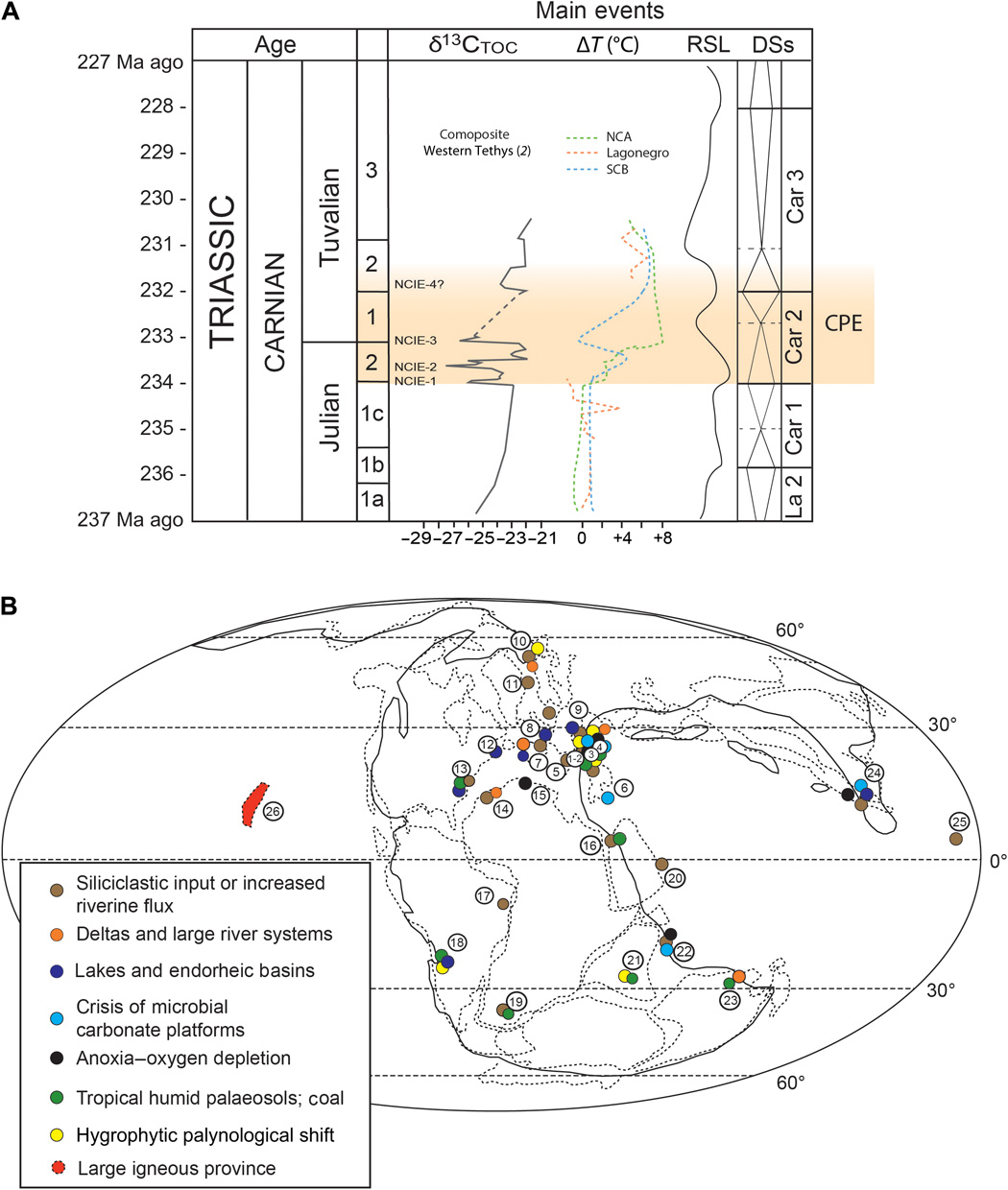
Timeline and map of the CPE, showing its effects on global ecosystems, δ^{13}C, and temperature (△T). The Wrangellia Large Igneous Province is the red patch at 26.

The consensus cause of the Carnian Pluvial Episode is the Wrangellia Large Igneous Province (LIP), a large patch of volcanic activity in the Panthalassan Ocean. In the present day, these volcanic rocks have been accreted onto Alaska and British Columbia. The recent discovery of a prominent δ^{13}C negative shift in higher plants' n-alkanes suggests a massive CO_{2} injection in the atmosphere-ocean system at the base of the CPE. The minimum radiometric age of the CPE (≈230.9 Ma) is similar in age to the basalts of the Wrangellia LIP. In the geological record, LIP volcanism is often correlated to episodes of major climate changes and extinctions, which may be caused by pollution of ecosystems with massive release of volcanic gases such as CO_{2} and SO_{2}. Conodont biostratigraphy and magnetostratigraphy clarifies the timing even further to a start around 234.5 Ma.

Large release of CO_{2} in the atmosphere-ocean system by Wrangellia can explain the increased supply of siliciclastic material into basins, as observed during the CPE. The increase of CO_{2} in the atmosphere could have resulted in global warming and consequent acceleration of the hydrological cycle, thus strongly enhancing the continental weathering. Moreover, if rapid enough, a sudden rise of pCO_{2} levels could have resulted in acidification of seawater with the consequent rise of the carbonate compensation depth (CCD) and a crisis of carbonate precipitation (e.g. demise of carbonate platforms in the western Tethys). On top of all that, the global warming brought on by the flood basalt event was likely exacerbated by the release of methane clathrates.

==== Geochemical traces for volcanic activity ====
The CPE is marked by disruptions to geochemical cycles, most notably the carbon cycle. Sediments corresponding to the base of the episode show a prominent −2 to −4‰ δ^{13}C excursion, indicating the release of a lightweight carbon isotope, carbon-12, into the atmosphere. This excursion was first mentioned for carbonates in Israel, and was later reported in more detail from fragments of carbonized wood in the Dolomites. It has been confirmed in various carbon-based sediments throughout Europe and Asia.

More precise stratigraphic evaluation of European outcrops has resolved this excursion into three or possibly four major pulses, spanning the late Julian and early Tuvalian. Each pulse can be equated with an interval of abnormal sedimentation on land and sea. The third excursion, at the Julian-Tuvalian boundary, is correlated with major ammonoid and conodont extinctions. A four-pulse episode is also strongly supported in terrestrial systems, particularly lake and river sediments in North China.

Norwegian shale and Japanese chert from the Ladinian-Carnian boundary show a marked change in the ratio of seawater osmium isotopes. The relative abundance of osmium-187 over osmium-188 declines strongly through most of the Julian before rebounding and stabilizing in the Tuvalian. The decline is attributed to early phases of the Wrangellia large igneous province enriching the ocean with osmium-188. Osmium-188 is preferentially sourced directly from the mantle, while osmium-187 is a radiogenic isotope supplied from eroded land.

In the Alps, moderate to high concentrations of mercury occur alongside carbon cycle disruptions, just prior to the sediment disruption which marks the CPE. These mercury spikes occur in well-oxygenated mudstones, meaning that they are not a consequence of redox fluctuations. The ratio of mercury to organic carbon is stronger and occurs earlier in areas corresponding to open marine environments. Although the mercury spikes do not correlate with any indicators of terrestrial runoff, runoff could help maintain high mercury concentrations in the ocean through the CPE. The most parsimonious explanation is that the mercury was initially derived from a pulse of volcanic activity, particularly the Wrangellia LIP. This further supports a volcanic cause of the Carnian pluvial episode. Mercury spikes are also found simultaneous to carbon cycle disruptions in both marine and lake sediments in China, and marine strata in Japan. These mercury spikes have no trace of mass-independent fractionation, meaning that their isotope distribution is most consistent with fallout from volcanic eruptions.

=== Uplift during the Cimmerian orogeny ===
According to an alternative hypothesis, the Carnian pluvial episode was a regional climatic perturbation mostly visible in the western Tethys and related to the uplift of a new mountain range, the Cimmerian orogen, which resulted from the closing of a Tethyan northern branch, east of the present European continent.

The new mountain range was forming on the southern side of Laurasia, and acted then as the Himalayas and Asia do today for the Indian Ocean, maintaining a strong pressure gradient between the ocean and continent, and thus generating a monsoon. Summer monsoonal winds were thus intercepted by the Cimmerian mountain range and generated strong rain, thus explaining the switch to humid climate recognized in western Tethys sediments.

Conversely, erosion of mountain ranges in central Pangaea may have allowed more moisture to reach the interior of the continent.

=== Influence from orbital cycles ===
In marine sediments of Tibet, a periodic pattern emerges from carbon isotope fluctuations, sea level highstand layers, and marine crises during the CPE. Astrochronology finds a strong link to a 1.2-million year obliquity modulation cycle (the wobble in the tilt of Earth's axis). This Milankovitch cycle may have enhanced biotic turnovers in the marine realm. In the Junggar Basin, 405-kyr eccentricity cycles (Earth's distance from the Sun) mark environmental fluctuations on land, similar to warm-cold climate cycles during the Oligocene and Miocene. Eccentricity cycles are also apparent in the Jiyuan Basin of North China, with four evenly-spaced spikes of carbon and mercury isotope disruption over the course of 1.65 million years. The primary driver of the CPE would have been four pulses of volcanic activity in the Wrangellia LIP, with orbital forcing helping to amplify each pulse.

=== Coal swamp recovery ===
Coal swamps recovered in the early Carnian, about 15 million years after their demise in the Permian-Triassic mass extinction. Prior to the recovery, the Early and Middle Triassic was a time of low biological productivity. Global temperature, atmospheric CO2 levels, erosion, and soil oxidation were all very high. The return of the forests reversed the paradigm, establishing a productive pathway for sequestering CO2 into stable soils. According to one model, an early Carnian drop in global CO2 would increase the relative severity of the CPE. This is because CO2 has a logarithmic influence on earth's climate, so any new spike in CO2 levels (such as during the Wrangellia eruptions) would have a greater effect if it is preceded by lower background levels in the atmosphere.
