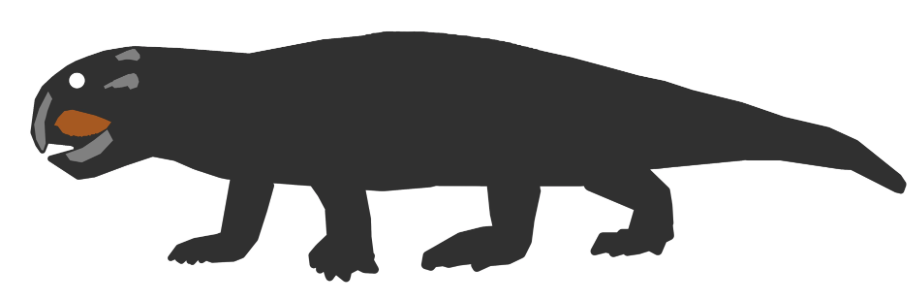
- Skeletal reconstruction of O. bairdi

Scientific classification
- Kingdom: Animalia
- Phylum: Chordata
- Class: Reptilia
- Order: †Rhynchosauria
- Family: †Rhynchosauridae
- Subfamily: †Hyperodapedontinae
- Genus: †Oryctorhynchus; Sues, Fitch & Whatley, 2020

Type species
- †Oryctorhynchus bairdi Sues, Fitch & Whatley, 2020

= Oryctorhynchus =

Oryctorhynchus Temporal range: Late Triassic, ~235–222 Ma

Extinct genus of reptiles

Oryctorhynchus is an extinct genus of rhynchosaur from the Late Triassic (Carnian-Norian)-aged Wolfville Formation of Nova Scotia, Canada. The type species, Oryctorhynchus bairdi, was named and described in 2020. It was likely a close relative of Beesiiwo, the two genera forming an endemic North American rhynchosaur clade. The Oryctorhynchus fossils were originally referred to the Hyperodapedon until 2020.

== Discovery and naming ==
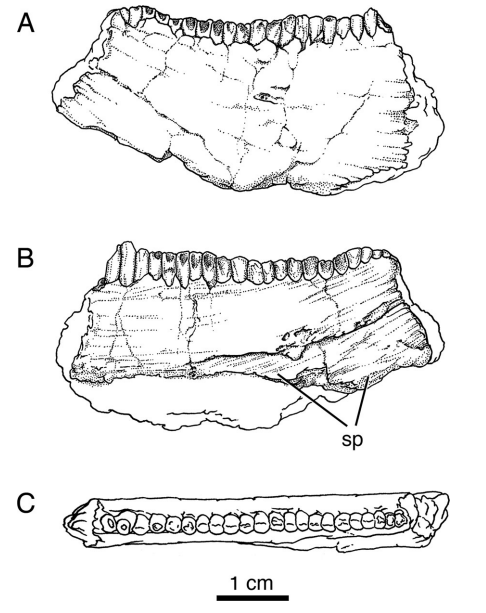
Left dentary of O. bairdi in A, lateral, B, medial, and C, dorsal views

The O. bairdi holotype was discovered in the Wolfville Formation by Donald Baird sometime between 1958 and 1963; its earliest known mention is by Baird (1963). Shortly after, it was informally named the "Nova Scotia Hyperodapedon" (H. sp.) by Robin Whatley in a 1984 paper published by J. A. Hopson. It was briefly described by Michael Benton (1983) also as a species of Hyperodapedon. It was then assigned to cf. "Hyperodapedon" sanjuanensis by Lucas et al., (2002). The specimen was not recognised as belonging to a distinct taxon until it was redescribed in 2020.

The holotype, NSM018GF009.012, consists of a partial jaw and several skull fragments, including the rostrum and skull roof.

Specimen NSM018GFF009.003 was initially referred to O. bairdi, but Fitch et al. (2023) later noted that the anatomical characters observed are more consistent with Beesiiwo cooowuse.

=== Etymology ===
The genus name consists of the orycto prefix, which means burrow, and the rhynchus suffix, meaning snout; the full genus name means burrowed snout. The epithet honours David Baird, for his work on Triassic tetrapods from Nova Scotia.

== Classification ==
Sues et al. (2020) placed Oryctorhynchus as the sister species to Hyperodapedon and an unnamed hyperodapedontine taxon from Wyoming, later named Beesiiwo.

== Paleoecology ==
Oryctorhynchus is known from the Wolfville Formation (Upper Wolfville Member; Fundy Basin), which probably corresponds to the Popo Agie Formation. The age of the Upper Wolfville Member is unclear; it either dates from the latest Carnian?–earliest Norian? or the late Carnian (~230 million years ago).

It would have coexisted with Acadiella, Arctotraversodon, Arctosuchus buceros (?), Haligonia, Scoloparia and Teraterpeton.
