= Wolfville Formation =

Geologic formation in Nova Scotia, Canada

- Stratigraphic range: Carnian-Norian; ~235–222 Ma
- Type: Geological formation
- Underlies: Blomidon Formation
- Thickness: 833 m (2,733 ft) in outcrop

Location
- Region: Nova Scotia
- Country: Canada

The Wolfville Formation is a Triassic geologic formation of Nova Scotia. The formation is of Carnian to early Norian age. Fossils of small land vertebrates have been found in the formation, including procolophonid and early archosauromorph reptiles and cynodonts. Dinosaur remains are among the fossils that have been recovered from the formation, although none have yet been referred to a specific genus.

== Vertebrate fauna ==
=== Synapsids ===
Synapsids of the Wolfville Formation
Genus	Species	Member	Abundance	Notes	Images
Arctotraversodon	A. plemmyridon				

=== Archosauromorphs ===
Archosauromorphs of the Wolfville Formation
Genus	Species	Member	Abundance	Notes	Images
Teraterpeton	T. hrynewichorum				Teraterpeton hrynewichorum
Oryctorhynchus	O. bairdi				

=== Procolophonids ===
Procolophonids of the Wolfville Formation
Genus	Species	Member	Abundance	Notes	Images
Acadiella	A. psalidodon				
Haligonia	H. bolodon				
?Scoloparia	S. glyphanodon				

Color key: Taxon / Reclassified taxon / Taxon falsely reported as present / Dubious taxon or junior synonym / Ichnotaxon / Ootaxon / Morphotaxon	Notes; Uncertain or tentative taxa are in small text; ~~crossed out~~ taxa are discredited.

== See also ==
- List of dinosaur-bearing rock formations
  - List of stratigraphic units with indeterminate dinosaur fossils
