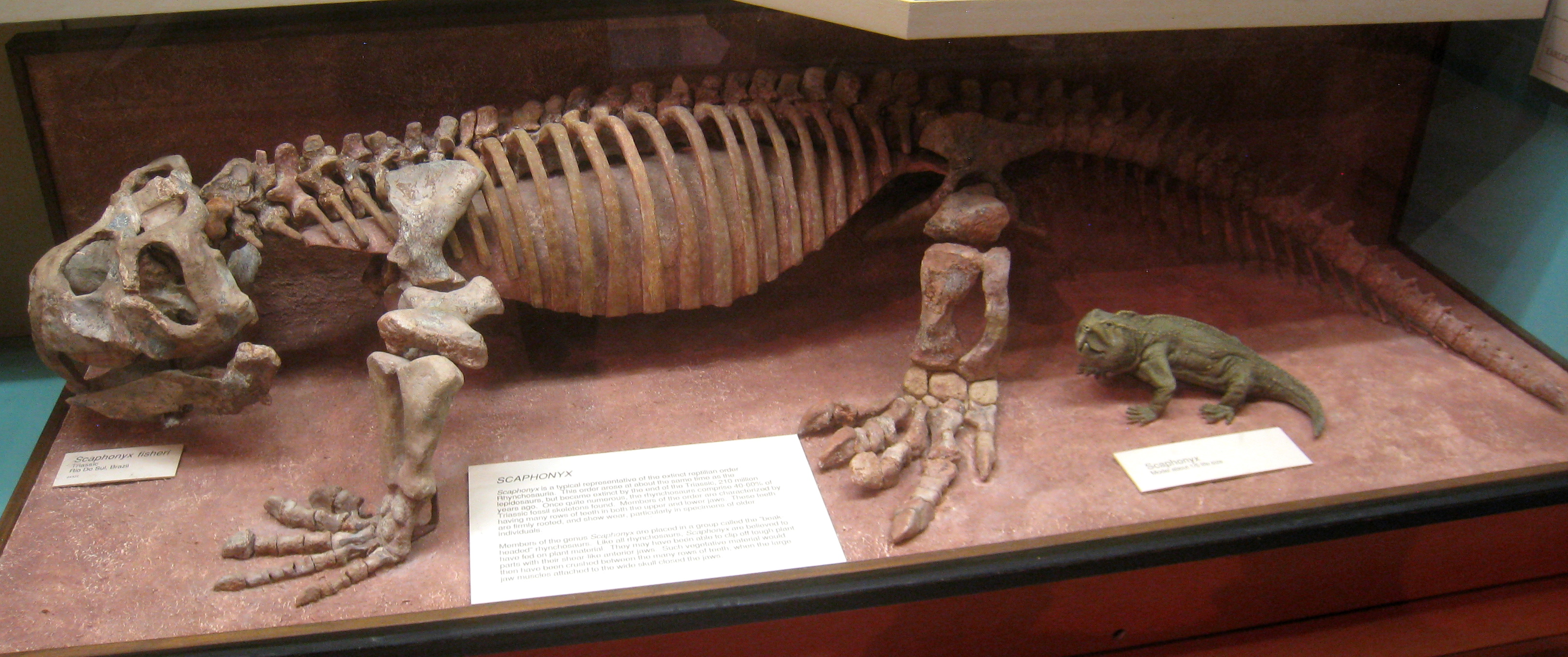
- Mounted skeleton of Hyperodapedon sanjuanensis at the University of Michigan Museum of Paleontology

Scientific classification
- Kingdom: Animalia
- Phylum: Chordata
- Class: Reptilia
- Order: †Rhynchosauria
- Family: †Rhynchosauridae
- Subfamily: †Hyperodapedontinae
- Genus: †Hyperodapedon; Huxley, 1859

Type species
- †Hyperodapedon gordoni Huxley, 1859

Species
- †H. gordoni Huxley, 1859 (type); †H. huenei Langer & Schultz, 2000; †H. huxleyi? Lydekker, 1881; †H. mariensis? (Tupi Caldas, 1933); †H. sanjuanensis? (Sill, 1970) emend. Langer & Schultz, 2000; †H. tikiensis Mukherjee & Ray, 2014

Synonyms
- Genus-level: Cephalonia Huene, 1942 (nomen dubium); Scaphonyx Woodward, 1907 (nomen dubium); Stenometopon Boulenger, 1903; Macrocephalosaurus? Tupi Caldas, 1933; Paradapedon Huene, 1938; Species-level: Cephalonia lotziana Huene, 1942 (nomen dubium); Scaphonyx africanus Boonstra, 1953 (nomen dubium); Scaphonyx australis Huene, 1926 (nomen dubium); Scaphonyx fischeri Woodward, 1907 (nomen dubium); Scaphonyx sanjuanensis Sill, 1970; Macrocephalosaurus mariensis Tupi Caldas, 1933; Paradapedon huxleyi (Lydekker, 1881); Stenometopon taylori Boulenger, 1903

= Hyperodapedon =

Hyperodapedon Temporal range: Late Triassic (Carnian), ~231–227 Ma

Extinct genus of reptiles

Hyperodapedon (from Greek: ῠ̔πέρ hupér, 'above' and Greek: δάπεδον dápedon, 'pavement') is an extinct genus of rhynchosaur reptiles which lived during Late Triassic period. Like other rhynchosaurs, it was a heavily built archosauromorph, distantly related to archosaurs such as crocodilians and dinosaurs. Hyperodapedon in particular was part of the subfamily Hyperodapedontinae, a specialized rhynchosaurian subgroup with broad skulls, beaked snouts, and crushing tooth plates on the roof of the mouth.

Hyperodapedon remains one of the most widespread and well-understood rhynchosaurs due to its abundance of fossils on several continents. It was named and discovered by Thomas Henry Huxley in 1859, based on H. gordoni, a species from Scotland. It has also been reported from Africa, Asia (India), and North and South America, though some species were later split off into their own genera. An Indian species, H. huxleyi, is also known by the genus name Paradapedon. Some of the early South American finds were described under the name Scaphonyx, which is often considered a junior synonym of Hyperodapedon. The relationship between Hyperodapedon species is a source of disagreement, and some studies argue that each species deserves its own genus. Hyperodapedon fossils are abundant and biostratigraphically significant in strata of the late Carnian stage, such as the Ischigualasto Formation of Argentina and the Upper Santa Maria Formation of Brazil. It is generally considered a herbivore that used its beaked premaxilla and hindlimbs to dig for plants on land.

== Discovery and species ==
=== H. gordoni ===
The first species of Hyperodapedon to be named and discovered was H. gordoni, from the Lossiemouth Sandstone near Elgin, Scotland. This species was named by Thomas Henry Huxley in honor of Rev. Dr. Gordon, the man who discovered the initial skeleton. Huxley initially named the species at an 1858 Geological Society of London conference. Huxley's correspondence was added as a postscript to Roderick Murchison's broader discussion on the age of the Elgin area sandstones. Hyperodapedon was the third reptile to be discovered in the area, behind Stagonolepis and "Telerpeton" (Leptopleuron), and reinforced Huxley's new hypothesis that the Lossiemouth Sandstone was Mesozoic in age, rather than Paleozoic. Both Murchison's talk and Huxley's postscript were published in print in 1859. Huxley described Hyperodapedon gordoni in further detail in 1869 and 1887. Additional specimens were listed or described by Lydekker (1888) and Burckhardt (1900). A complete redescription of all H. gordoni material was undertaken by Michael Benton in 1983.

T.H. Huxley found many series of subcylindrical palatal teeth which was the main trait of Hyperodapedon. Huxley was able to distinguish Hyperodapedon from Rhynchosaurus articeps by the maxillary tooth rows. Later on, Lydekker realized that Hyperodapedon have more than two rows of teeth in both the maxilla and palatine.

=== H. huxleyi (Paradapedon) ===
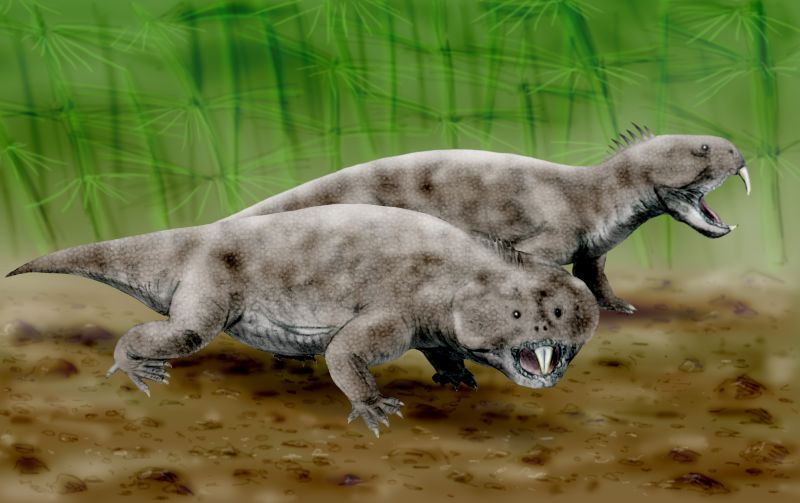
Life restoration of Hyperodapedon huxleyi

Hyperodapedon huxleyi was named by English naturalist Richard Lydekker in 1881 based on fossils from the Lower Maleri Formation of India. It was described in more detail by the same author in 1885. Lydekker used the genus Hyperodapedon for the species, but German paleontologist Friedrich von Huene was of the opinion that it constituted a new genus closely related to Hyperodapedon. In 1938, von Huene established the new genus Paradapedon for the species. All fossils referred to Paradapedon were redescribed by Indian-American paleontologist Sankar Chatterjee in 1974.

For much of the 20th century, Paradapedon huxleyi was entangled with debates over the validity of Parasuchus hislopi, a species which was first mentioned by Huxley (1870) and formally described by Lydekker (1885). One of the syntype fossils of Parasuchus hislopi was a collection of bones including a partial braincase, osteoderms (bony scutes), teeth, and other associated material. The braincase was later identified as belonging to a rhynchosaur, but the other bones in the syntype are from a carnivorous phytosaur. This would make the syntype a chimera, comprising fossil material from two unrelated animal species.

To remedy this issue, von Huene (1940) elected to abandon the name Parasuchus hislopi, as he considered the name to apply to the rhynchosaur braincase first and foremost, which was certainly referrable to Paradapedon huxleyi. Chatterjee (1974) disagreed, noting that the braincase had no special status relative to the other fossils, as it was merely a syntype rather than a holotype. He separated the braincase from Parasuchus hislopi and named a phytosaur snout fragment as a new lectotype for the species. Assisted by the discovery of new complete skeletons, Parasuchus hislopi is still considered a valid phytosaur taxon to the present day.

Benton (1983) concluded that "Paradapedon" huxleyi should once again be considered a species of Hyperodapedon, thus rendering Paradapedon a junior synonym of Hyperodapedon.

=== H. sanjuanensis (Scaphonyx) ===
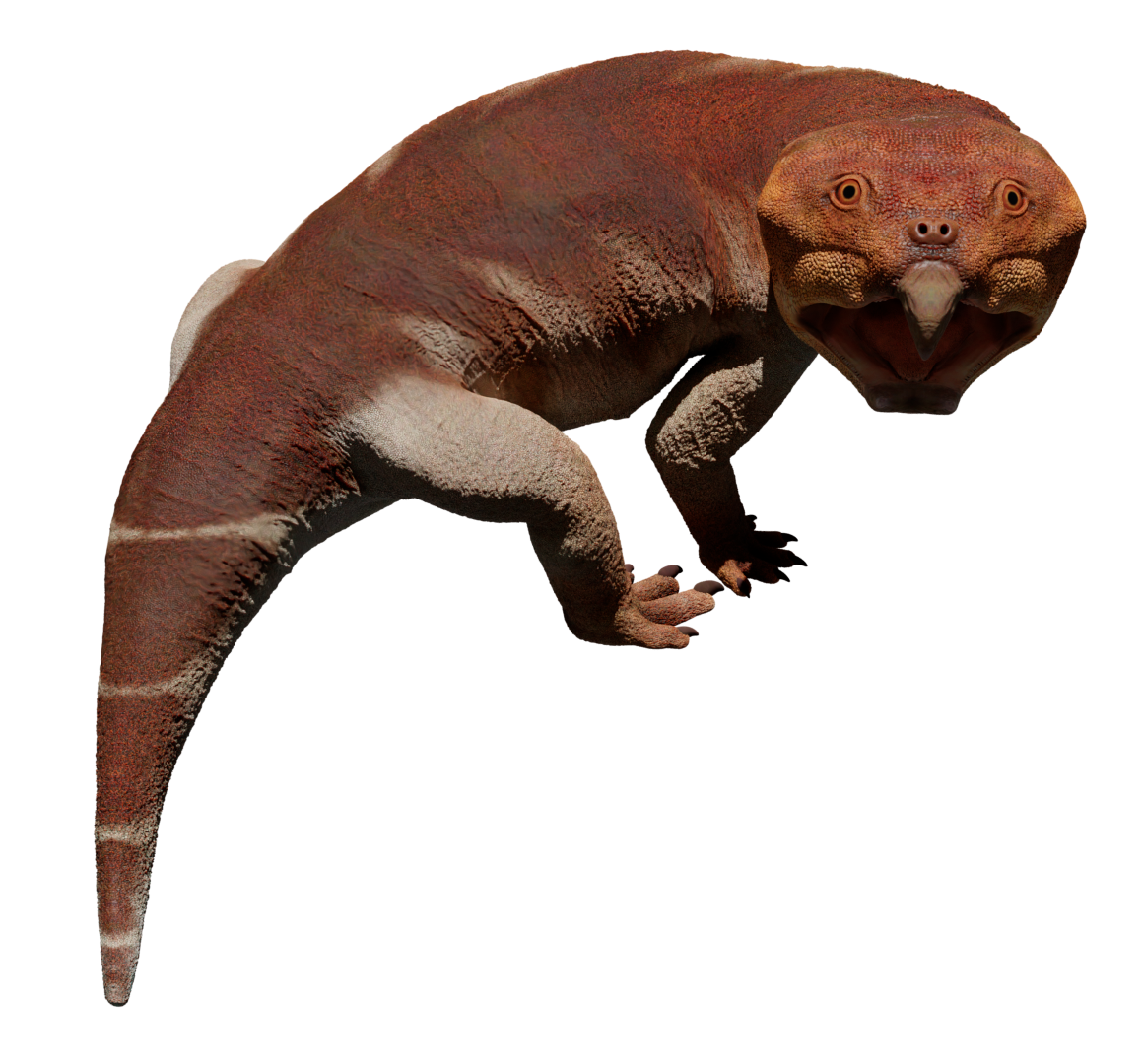
Life reconstruction of H. sanjuanensis

Fossils of Hyperodapedon sanjuanensis were previously described under the names Scaphonyx fischeri and Scaphonyx sanjuanensis prior to formally being referred to Hyperodapedon in 2000.

Arthur Smith Woodward (1907) named a new genus and species, Scaphonyx fischeri, for a small number of reptile vertebrae and phalanges from the Upper Santa Maria Formation, in the Brazilian state of Rio Grande do Sul. The genus name Scaphonyx (meaning canoe claw) referred to the scoop-like shape of the reptile's claws, while the species name honors Dr. Jango Fischer, who discovered the fossils in 1902. At the time Woodward considered Scaphonyx fischeri to be a short-necked dinosaur closely related to Euskelosaurus. Further collection from the same area by Friedrich von Huene produced more extensive fossil material. Huene (1926) informally proposed multiple new names to describe the reptile fossils he had collected: Cephalonia, Cephalastron, Cephalostronius, and Scaphonychimus. By 1942, he had lumped all of these remains into either Cephalonia lotziana (a gracile form) or Scaphonyx fischeri (a robust form), while recognizing their rhynchosaurian affinities.

The name Scaphonyx sanjuanensis was established by Sill (1970) in reference to rhynchosaur fossils from the Ischigualasto Formation of Argentina. Sill also demonstrated the synonymy of Cephalonia lotziana and Scaphonyx fischeri, with fossils of the latter simply having been recrystallized into a more inflated state via diagenetic processes.

H. sanjuanensis is regarded as the most abundant fossil organism preserved in the Ischigualasto Formation, making up the majority of fossils found within the first 100 metres (328 ft) of the formation.

=== H. huenei ===
Hyperodapedon huenei was named by Langer & Schultz (2000), in the same publication which transferred H. sanjuanensis into the genus. The specific name honors Friedrich von Huene. H. huenei is another Brazilian species from the Upper Santa Maria Formation. The holotype is a large and well-preserved skull, UFRGS PV0132T. Only a few other maxilla and dentary fragments were referred to the species in its initial description.

Diagnostic features of H. huenei include the absence of an infraorbital foramen, a single dentary blade, and fusion between the supraoocipital and opisthotic bones of the braincase. In addition, the rear portion of the maxillary tooth plate has a secondary wear groove alongside the main longitudinal groove, and the medial portion of the tooth plate is broader than the lateral portion. Both conditions are similar to more basal rhynchosaurs but unlike other species of Hyperodapedon.

=== H. tikiensis ===
Hyperodapedon tikiensis was named by Mukherjee & Ray (2014) from the Tiki Formation in the Rewa Basin of India. This diagnosis of this species relies on several features of the cranial and postcranial skeleton. Cranial autapomorphies (unique diagnostic features) include a basipterygoid process which is longer than wide and a crest-shaped maxillary cross section next to the main longitudinal groove. The lateral tooth field of the tooth plate is broader than that on the medial side, with three tooth rows versus two on the medial side. The rear edge of the tooth plate also has a broader angle (130°) compared to other species in the genus. The postcranial diagnostic features include ilium proportions, deeply excavated neural arches on the mid dorsal vertebrae, a long scapular blade, a pronounced deltopectoral crest, and a proximal humeral end which is broader at the distal end.

== Description ==
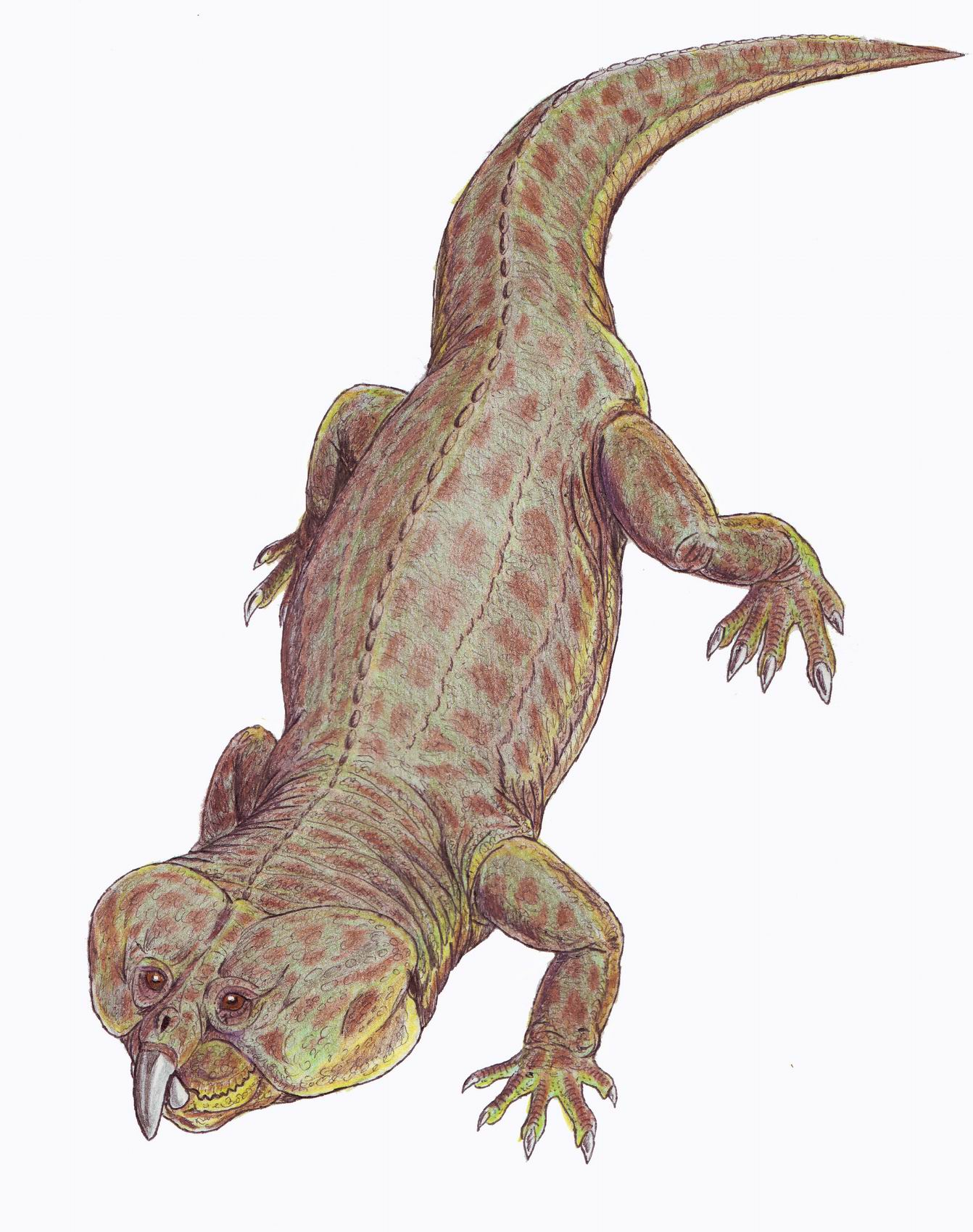
H. huxleyi (formerly Paradapedon)

Hyperodapedon was a stocky and heavily built animal with thick limbs and a broad skull and body. H. gordoni had a total length around 1.3 metres (4.3 ft), with a skull length of 13 to 18 centimetres (5.1 to 7.1 in). The largest species, H. huxleyi, had an estimated skull length around 42 centimetres (17 in) and a lower jaw of ~47 centimetres (19 in).

=== Skull ===
Apart from its beak, it had several rows of teeth on each side of the upper jaw, and a single row on each side of the lower jaw, creating a powerful chopping action when it ate. The tooth rows of the upper jaw were hosted by tooth plates formed by the fusion of the maxilla and palatine bones. The tooth plates have even rows of small conical teeth, separated by a longitudinal groove which receives the teeth of the lower jaw. The teeth had open roots which could not be replaced like other reptiles.

The upper temporal bar faces dorsally and is raised above the level of the ventral margin of the orbit (eye socket). The braincase of Hyperodapedon had a longitudinal stapedial canal on the posterior side of the spatulate paroccipital process which the lagenar crest extended laterally to limit the posterior end. The pterygoid of Hyperodapedon lacks a pair of ridges present in other rhynchosaurs, as well as palatal dentition as a whole. The prefrontal is deeply concave on the dorsal side.

==== Lower jaw ====
Like other rhynchosaurids, the dentary of Hyperodapedon makes up half the length of the lower jaw. Hyperodapedon have a single row of teeth in mandible which bites into the groove between the tooth rows of the upper jaw. In front of the tooth row, the upper edge of the dentary has the form of a sharp blade.

== Classification ==
Rhynchosaurs are archosauromorph diapsids, meaning that they are reptiles more closely related to archosaurs (such as crocodilians and birds) rather than lepidosaurs (such as lizards). Within Rhynchosauria, Hyperodapedon is the namesake of Hyperodapedontinae, a smaller clade meant to encompass Late Triassic rhynchosaurs while excluding more basal taxa such as Rhynchosaurus and stenaulorhynchines.

Langer et al. (2000) defined Hyperodapedon as a stem-based taxon that includes all rhynchosaurs closer to Hyperodapedon gordoni than to Scaphonyx sulcognathus (a species which was renamed to Teyumbaita in 2010). This definition for the genus is reliant on the assumption that Teyumbaita is the sister taxon to Hyperodapedon, rather than deeply nested within it. The cladogram below is based on the phylogenetic analysis of Mukherjee & Ray (2014), a study which supports the definition provided by Langer et al. (2000):

- Hyperodapedontinae
  - Isalorhynchus genovefae
  - - Teyumbaita sulcognathus
    - Hyperodapedon
      - H. huenei
      - - - H. mariensis (Macrocephalosaurus)
          - H. sanjuanensis
          - H. sp from Wolfville (Oryctorhynchus)
        - - H. sp from India
          - - H. huxleyi (Paradapedon)
            - - H. gordoni
              - - H. sp from Wyoming (Beesiiwo)
                - H. sp from Zimbabwe
                - H. tikiensis
                - Supradapedon stockleyi

Valid species that were first assigned to Scaphonyx.

Other studies have nested Teyumbaita deep within the clade of Hyperodapedon species. If this is the case, then Hyperodapedon in its broadest form would be a paraphyletic genus rather than an exclusive monophyletic clade. As a result, it has been proposed to split up the genus into multiple genera, with one species each. Several of the new genera had been used in the past (Scaphonyx for H. sanjuanensis, Macrocephalosaurus for H. mariensis, Paradapedon for H. huxleyi, Supradapedon for H. stockleyi) while others are newly named (Beesiiwo, Oryctorhynchus). The type species H. gordoni would be the only species left in the genus under this narrow interpretation.

The following cladogram is based on the phylogenetic analysis by Fitch et al. (2023):

- - Isalorhynchus genovefae
  - Hyperodapedontinae
    - - Beesiiwo cooowuse
      - Oryctorhynchus bairdi
    - - Hyperodapedon gordoni
      - - "Zimbabwe Form"
        - - Paradapedon huxleyi
          - - - Scaphonyx sanjuanensis
              - Macrocephalosaurus mariensis
            - - "Hyperodapedon" tikiensis
              - - Supradapedon stockleyi
                - - "Hyperodapedon" huenei
                  - Teyumbaita sulcognathus

== Palaeobiology ==
=== Senses ===
The skull had large orbits and robust scleral plates, which would have supported the eyes. These presumably allowed for a good sense of vision. The nasal capsules were also large, assisting the sense of smell. Since Hyperodapedon did not have space for a tympanum (eardrum), they may be able to sense sound by the skin near the quadrate. The premaxilla is extremely dense, especially towards the tip, and dotted with clusters of pits. These bone was most likely covered in a highly sensitive keratinous sheath.

=== Posture and mobility ===
Hyperodapedon gordoni is the rhynchosaur species with the greatest depth of biomechanical investigation, courtesy of Benton (1983). The neck was the most flexible region of the body overall, according to the structure of the vertebrae. The neck and cervical ribs also hosted strong attachment points for muscles related to stabilizing, swinging, and lowering the heavy head. The central part of the torso was mostly suited for lateral bending. The shoulder, hip, and tail were the least flexible regions of the body. Other species, such as "Paradapedon" huxleyi, may have had slightly greater shoulder flexibility relative to H. gordoni.

H. gordoni likely preferred a semi-sprawling limb posture, with the hindlimbs more powerful and flexible than the forelimbs. During movement of the forelimb, the humerus could travel along an arc of about 100°. This range of motion was enabled by a narrow glenoid (shoulder joint) which allowed the humerus to rock against the shoulder girdle rather than sliding. At its maximum forward extension, the upper arm was sprawled out sideways and slightly forwards and downwards. In its maximum rearward position, the humerus points nearly straight back and lies flat against the body, twisting the forearm inwards and narrowing the stance of the forelimb as a whole. The forelimbs were likely secondary to the hindlimbs during locomotion, since the shoulder joint was small and weak while its associated muscles were poorly positioned for strong movement.

The hip joint consists of a broad acetabulum (hip socket) and an indistinct femoral head, so it would have been broadly flexible, even accounting for the presence of cartilage to fill in the gaps. The ideal posture to maximize stride length was semi-erect, with the thigh about 45° below the horizontal (when seen from both the front and the side) at the start and end of its 90° arc. The knee and ankle joints were rather simple and hinge-like, so much of the hindlimb's movement relied on the rolling hip joint. Despite its heavyset body, the limb proportions of Hyperodapedon were similar to active and relatively agile dinosaurs such as Protoceratops. Regardless, Hyperodapedon was certainly fully quadrupedal, owing to its narrow hip, short tail, and bulky torso.

Several lines of evidence support the idea that Hyperodapedon and other rhynchosaurs used their hindlimbs for scratch digging, a versatile type of burrowing behavior utilized by animals such as turtles, ground squirrels, armadillos, and pangolins, among others. Scratch-diggers combine a strong lower limb with large claws to loosen and scrape dirt backwards. Like living scratch-diggers, Hyperodapedon had a large foot with tall, narrow claws, though these adaptations occur on the hind feet rather than the front feet. The pelvis and tibia had room for dense musculature, and the stout interlocking toe phalanges would have been reinforced with strong ligaments. Both forelimbs and one hindlimb could act to brace the body while the other hindlimb engages in digging.

=== Development ===
Histology of limb bones in H. huxleyi and H. tikiensis have helped to estimate growth rate. Juveniles had a fast growth rate, as indicated by their uneven bone cortex. Subadults grew more slowly, with occasional pauses in bone deposition. Adults had the slowest growth rate, but even then they never stopped growing through their life. Overall, Hyperodapedon had a more aggressive developmental strategy than most reptiles, and its metabolism was likely more similar to early archosauriforms like Proterosuchus and Erythrosuchus. The thickness of the bone cortex is in line with terrestrial quadrupeds and far below that expected for specialized aquatic or burrowing animals. Nevertheless, the hindlimbs had much thicker cortex than the forelimbs, which may support strong musculature and a scratch-digging lifestyle.

== Palaeoecology ==
=== Diet ===
Hyperodapedon is believed to have been herbivorous, feeding mainly on "seed ferns". The jaws allowed for a precision-shear bite to break down the tough plants that they ate. The humerus had a wide range of motion, though the femur was more limited in its ability to rotate relative to the body. It has been suggested that the beak-like premaxilla and hind limbs were used for digging up food. The genus may have died out when these plants became extinct in the later part of the Triassic. Molluscs are another hypothesized food source requiring a strong crushing jaw to exploit.

=== Predation ===
Fossils of the mandible and cranium of H. huxleyi from the Maleri Formation show bite marks most likely made by phytosaurs, indicating that these reptiles likely would have preyed on Hyperodapedon.

=== Distribution ===
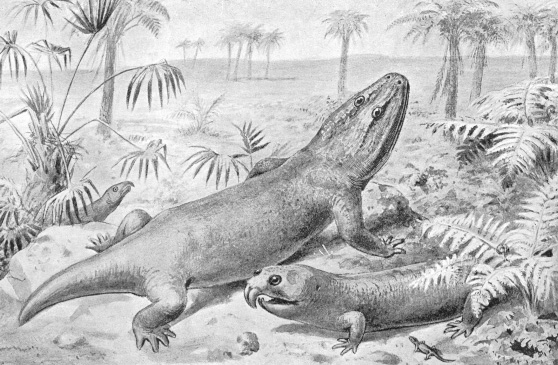
An 1894 illustration by Joseph Smit, depicting (from left to right): Rhynchosaurus, Mastodonsaurus, Hyperodapedon, and "Telerpeton"

Hyperodapedon was a widely distributed tetrapod during the Upper Triassic, present in most locations where phytosaurs are absent. In the controversial Land Vertebrate Faunachron system, Hyperodapedon is prevalent in many formations assigned to the Adamanian or Otischalkian faunachrons. Similarly, Rhynchosaurus is found in fluvial-intertidal deposits with desiccation along with aeolian deposits with common flash floods. Fossils of Hyperodapedon, or fossils previously referred to the genus or its synonyms, have been found in:

- Ischigualasto Formation, Argentina (H. sanjuanensis; also Teyumbaita sp.)
- Upper Santa Maria Formation, Brazil (H. huenei, H. sanjuanensis, H. mariensis?)
- Caturrita Formation, Brazil (Teyumbaita sulcognathus, formerly "Scaphonyx" sulcognathus)
- Wolfville Formation, Nova Scotia, Canada (Oryctorhynchus bairdi, formerly cf. "Scaphonyx" sanjuanensis)
- Lower Maleri Formation, India (H. huxleyi)
- Tiki Formation, India (H. tikiensis)
- "Tunduru beds", Tanzania (Supradapedon stockleyi, formerly "Scaphonyx" stockleyi)
- Lossiemouth Sandstone, Scotland, UK (H. gordoni)
- Popo Agie Formation, Wyoming, USA (Beesiiwo cooowuse, formerly cf. "Scaphonyx" sanjuanensis)
