= Blomidon Formation =

- Stratigraphic range: Norian-Rhaetian
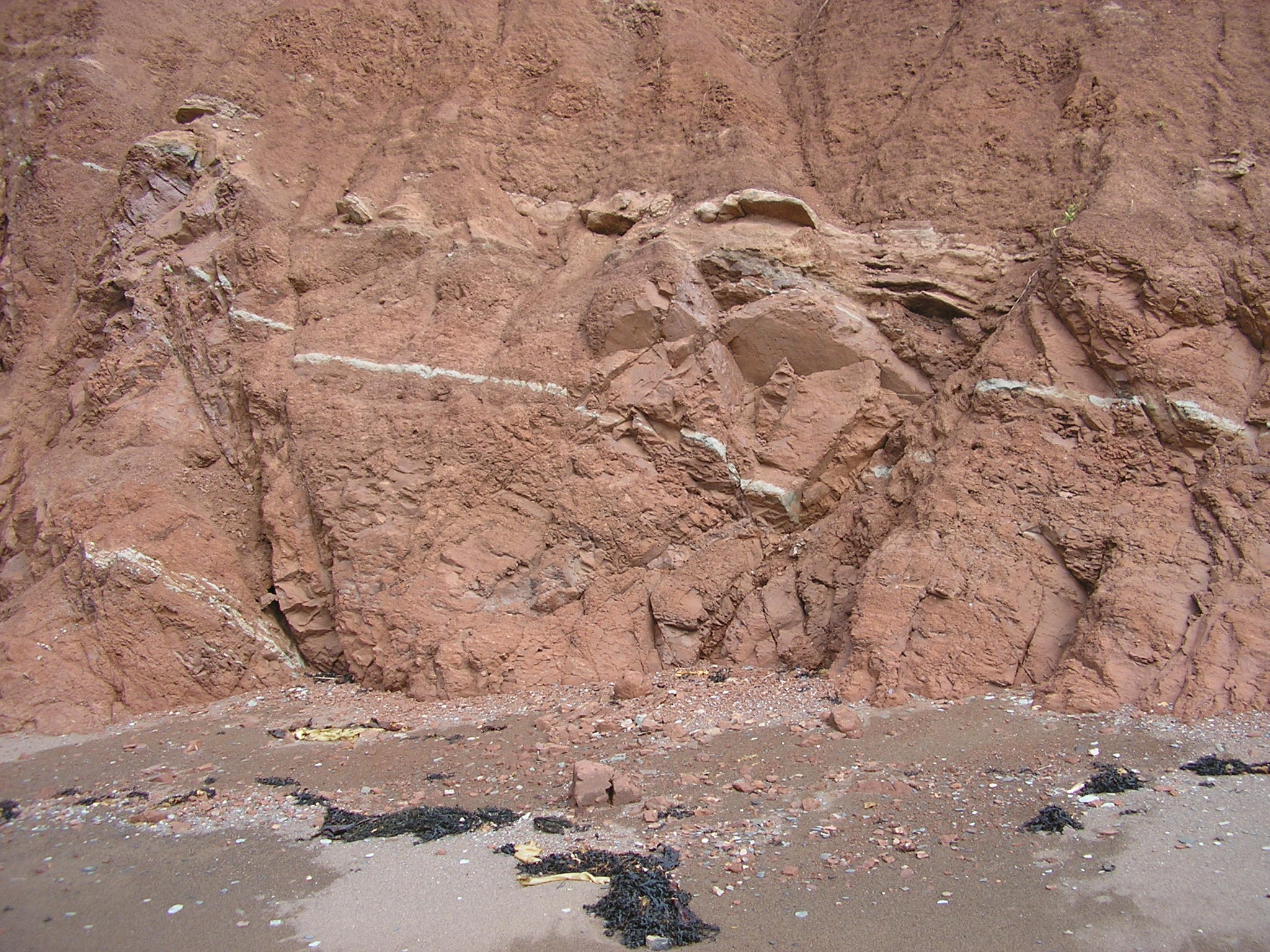
- Faulted continental redbeds of the Blomidon Formation, Minas Basin North Shore, Nova Scotia
- Type: Geological formation
- Unit of: Newark Supergroup
- Underlies: North Mountain Basalt
- Overlies: Wolfville Formation
- Thickness: 365–2,500 m (1,198–8,202 ft)

Lithology
- Primary: Sandstone
- Other: Mudstone

Location
- Coordinates: 45°17′43″N 64°19′55″W
- Region: Nova Scotia, New Brunswick
- Country: Canada

Type section
- Named for: Cape Blomidon
- Named by: Klein, 1962

The Blomidon Formation is a unit of Upper Triassic (Norian–Rhaetian) sedimentary rocks, which outcrops in Nova Scotia. At outcrop they reach a maximum thickness of 365 metres (1,198 ft), but up to 1,168 metres (3,832 ft) has been proven from well data and a thickness of up to 2,500 metres (8,200 ft) has been inferred from seismic reflection data. It overlies the mainly Carnian Wolfville Formation and underlies the North Mountain Basalt. The type section is exposed between Cape Blomidon (45°17′43″N 64°19′55″W) and Paddy Island (45.197372°N 64.359411°W).
