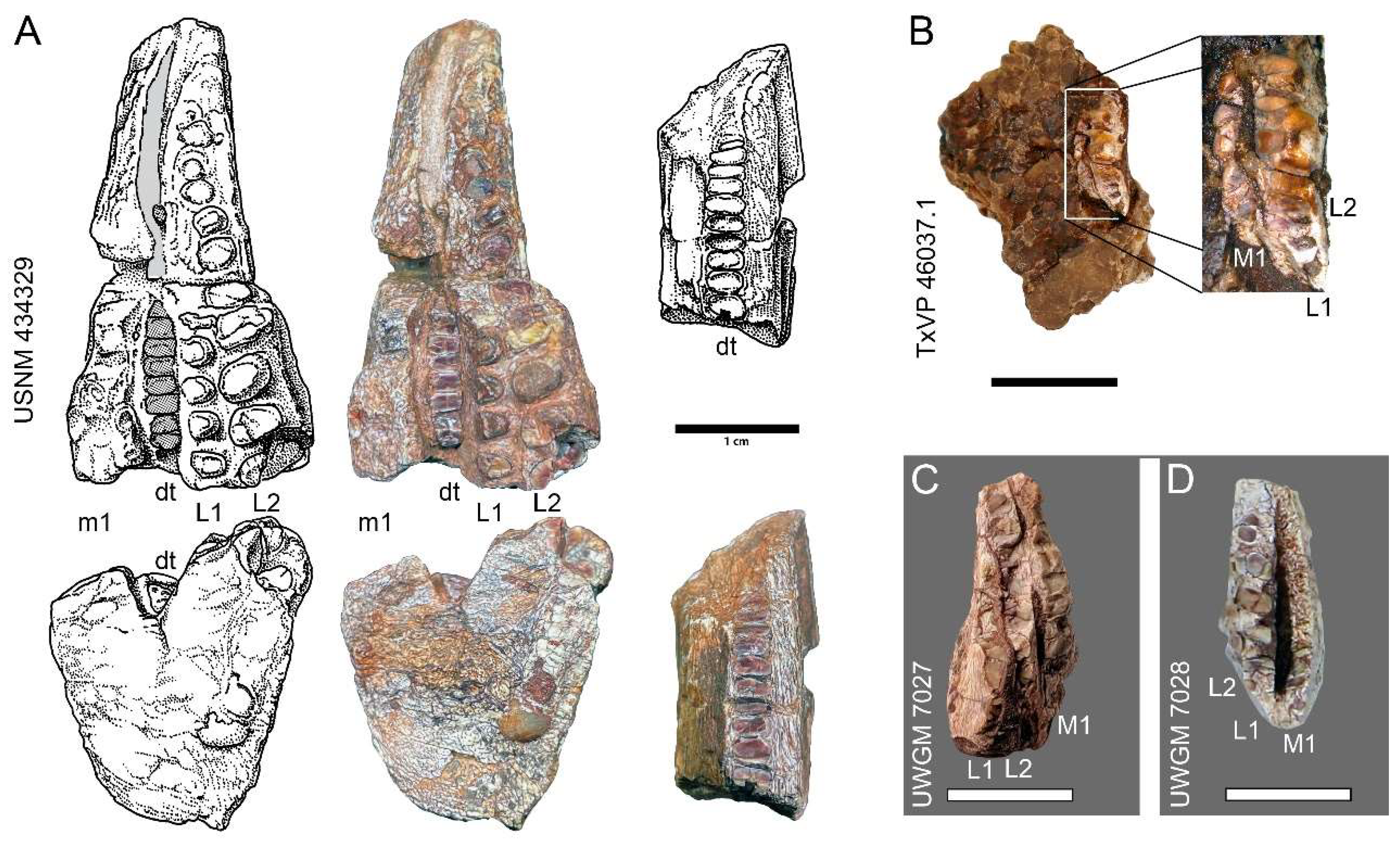
- Holotype of B. cooowuse

Scientific classification
- Kingdom: Animalia
- Phylum: Chordata
- Class: Reptilia
- Order: †Rhynchosauria
- Family: †Rhynchosauridae
- Subfamily: †Hyperodapedontinae
- Genus: †Beesiiwo; Fitch et al., 2023

Type species
- †Beesiiwo cooowuse Fitch et al., 2023

= Beesiiwo =

Beesiiwo Temporal range: Late Triassic (Carnian), 237–227 Ma

Genus of rhynchosaurian reptile

Beesiiwo (meaning "big lizard") is a genus of hyperodapedontine rhynchosaur known from the Late Triassic Popo Agie Formation in western Wyoming, United States. The type and only species is Beesiiwo cooowuse, known from four fragmentary jaw bones.

== Description ==
Beesiiwo is known from four specimens which were referred to B. cooowuse in 2023 by Fitch et al. (2023). The holotype, USNM 494329 consists of a fragment of a left maxilla, and a left dentary, it was previously assigned to cf. "Hyperodapedon" sanjuanensis by Lucas et al. (2002). The additional specimens, UWGM 7027, UWGM 7028, and TxVP 46037.1, consist of fragments of two right maxillae, and a left maxilla. The authors state that an additional specimen, NSM018GFF009.003 (which had been referred to Oryctorhynchus bairdi by Sues et al. (2020)) was not support as belonging to O. bairdi, and is more closely affiliated with Beesiiwo.

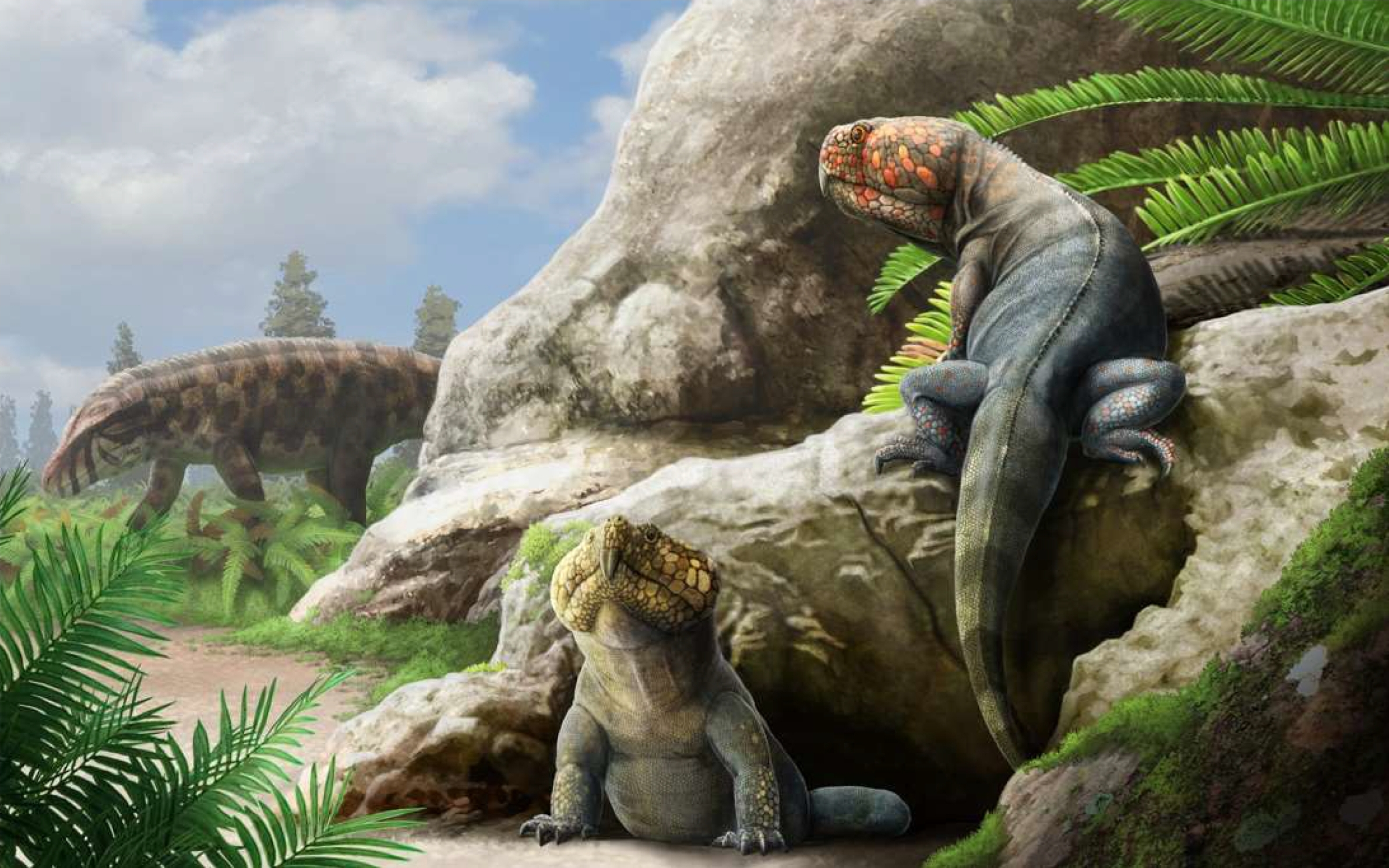
Life reconstruction of Beesiiwo cooowuse by palaeoartist Gabriel Ugueto

== Etymology ==
The generic name, Beesiiwo, is the Arapaho word beesiiwó, which translates to "big lizard" in English. The specific name, cooowuse , derives from the Arapaho name co' oowu se', which refers to the Alcova area of Central Wyoming, an area within traditional Arapaho Tribe land where Beesiiwo was found. The name was created by Fitch's Arapaho coauthors and is intended to honor the Arapaho people, language and continued stewardship of the Earth, as well as counteract a perceived "colonialism" in the form of using scientific names derived from geographical and personal names "given by colonizers" that "honor the colonizer at the expense of First Nations peoples".

== Classification ==
Fitch et al., (2023) recovered Beesiiwo in the Hyperodapedontinae subfamily of Hyperodapedontidae, as a sister taxon to Oryctorhynchus bairdi in a phylogenetic analysis. Their results are shown below:

- Hyperodapedontinae
  - Isalorhynchus
  - - - Beesiiwo
      - Oryctorhynchus
    - - Hyperodapedon gordoni
      - - "Zimbabwe Form"
        - - Paradapedon
          - - - "Scaphonyx"
              - Macrocephalosaurus
            - - "Hyperodapedon" tikiensis
              - - Supradapedon
                - - "Hyperodapedon" huenei
                  - Teyumbaita
