= Jaci Antonio Louzada Tupi Caldas =

Brazilian paleontologist

- Born: July 19, 1898
- Died: 1946; Porto Alegre
- Known for: Tupi Caldas
- Scientific career
- Fields: paleontologist

Jaci Antonio Louzada Tupi Caldas (Also signed: Jacy Antonio Louzada Tupy Caldas, but was best known as Tupi Caldas.) (19 July 1898 – 1946) was a Brazilian paleontologist. He gave contributions to paleontology describing some of the animals found in the region Paleorrota.

== Biography ==
He lived in Porto Alegre, was professor of military school and a member of the Historical and Geographical Institute of Rio Grande do Sul, formed in Pharmacy - in 1917 the Faculty of Medicine of Porto Alegre. In paleontology helped describe Dinodontosaurus pedroanum and Hyperodapedon mariensis.
