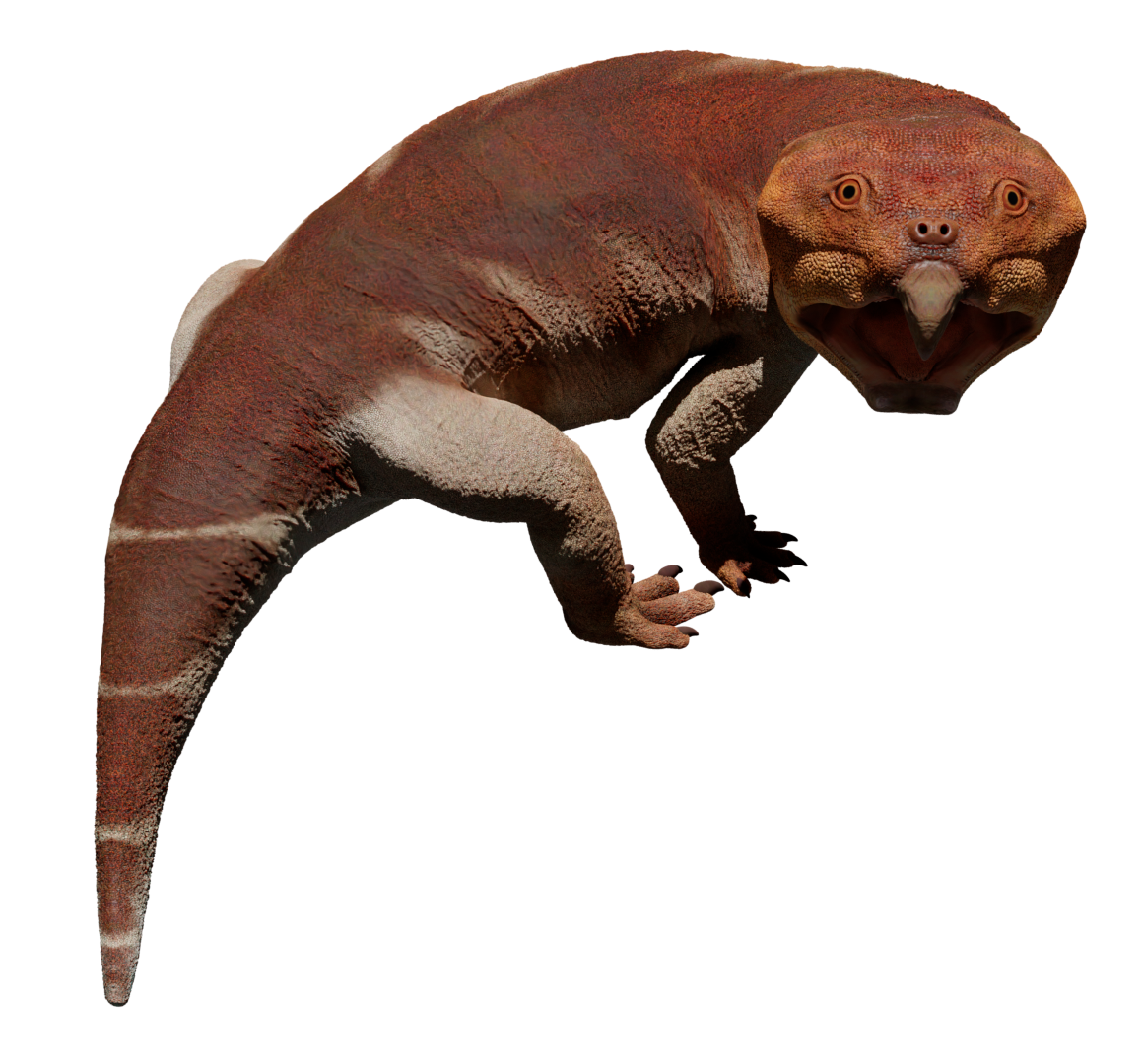
- Life restoration of Hyperodapedon sanjuanensis

Scientific classification
- Kingdom: Animalia
- Phylum: Chordata
- Class: Reptilia
- Order: †Rhynchosauria
- Family: †Rhynchosauridae
- Subfamily: †Hyperodapedontinae; Chatterjee, 1969

Subgroups
- †Beesiiwo; †Hyperodapedon; †Isalorhynchus; †Isodapedon; †Macrocephalosaurus; †Oryctorhynchus; †Supradapedon; †Teyumbaita

= Hyperodapedontinae =

Hyperodapedontinae Temporal range: Carnian - Early Norian (Possible Middle Triassic origin)

Extinct subfamily of reptiles

Hyperodapedontinae is a subfamily of rhynchosaurs within the family Rhynchosauridae. Fossils have been found in Argentina, Brazil, Canada, India, Madagascar, Scotland, Tanzania, the United States, and Zimbabwe.

== Phylogeny ==
Hyperodapedontinae was erected by Sankar Chatterjee in 1969 as a coordinate name of the family Hyperodapedontidae Lydekker, 1985. Chatterjee (1969) originally named Hyperodapedontinae to include all Late Triassic rhynchosaurs known at that time, H. gordoni, H. huxleyi and "Scaphonyx" fischeri, and proposed a morphological diagnosis for the clade. Scaphonyx includes two additional species, S. africanus and S. australis, all of which are currently believed to be dubious. As noted by Langer et al. (2000), using Chatterjee' morphological definition would exclude Teyumbaita and H. huenei from the clade, and thus it would be nested within Hyperodapedon. To preserve the name, with its original stratigraphical meaning, Langer et al. (2000) redefined Hyperodapedontinae as a stem-based taxon that includes "all rhynchosaurs closer to Hyperodapedon than to "Rhynchosaurus" spenceri (now Fodonyx)".

The cladogram below follows Mukherjee & Ray (2014):

- Hyperodapedontinae
  - Isalorhynchus genovefae
  - - Teyumbaita sulcognathus
    - Hyperodapedon
      - H. huenei
      - - - H. mariensis (now Macrocephalosaurus mariensis)
          - H. sanjuanensis
          - H. sp. from Wolfville (now Oryctorhynchus bairdi)
        - - H. sp. from India
          - - H. huxleyi
            - - H. gordoni
              - - H. sp. from Wyoming (now Beesiiwo cooowuse)
                - H. sp. from Zimbabwe
                - H. tikiensis
                - Supradapedon stockleyi

Valid species that were first assigned to Scaphonyx.

The following cladogram is based on the phylogenetic analysis by Fitch et al. (2023):

- - Isalorhynchus genovefae
  - Hyperodapedontinae
    - - Beesiiwo cooowuse
      - Oryctorhynchus bairdi
    - - Hyperodapedon gordoni
      - - "Zimbabwe Form"
        - - Paradapedon huxleyi
          - - - "Scaphonyx" sanjuanensis
              - Macrocephalosaurus mariensis
            - - "Hyperodapedon" tikiensis
              - - Supradapedon stockleyi
                - - "Hyperodapedon" huenei
                  - Teyumbaita sulcognathus
