= Haligonia =

Haligonia Temporal range: Late Triassic

Scientific classification
- Domain: Eukaryota
- Kingdom: Animalia
- Phylum: Chordata
- Clade: †Parareptilia
- Order: †Procolophonomorpha
- Family: †Procolophonidae
- Genus: †Haligonia
- Species: †H. bolodon

Binomial name
- †Haligonia bolodon Sues & Baird, 1998

Haligonia is an extinct genus of procolophonid that inhabited Nova Scotia during the Late Triassic epoch. It contains a single species, H. bolodon.
