= Acadiella =

Acadiella Temporal range: Late Triassic

Scientific classification
- Domain: Eukaryota
- Kingdom: Animalia
- Phylum: Chordata
- Clade: †Parareptilia
- Order: †Procolophonomorpha
- Family: †Procolophonidae
- Genus: †Acadiella
- Species: †A. psalidodon

Binomial name
- †Acadiella psalidodon Sues & Baird, 1998

Acadiella is an extinct genus of procolophonid that lived in Nova Scotia during the Late Triassic epoch. It contains a single species, A. psalidodon.
