= Supradapedon =

Supradapedon Temporal range: Middle - Late Triassic

Scientific classification
- Domain: Eukaryota
- Kingdom: Animalia
- Phylum: Chordata
- Class: Reptilia
- Clade: Archosauromorpha
- Order: †Rhynchosauria
- Family: †Rhynchosauridae
- Subfamily: †Hyperodapedontinae
- Genus: †Supradapedon; Chatterjee, 1980

Species
- †S. stockleyi (Boonstra, 1953) (type)

Synonyms
- Scaphonyx stockleyi Boonstra, 1953

Extinct genus of reptiles

Supradapedon is an extinct genus of hyperodapedontine rhynchosaur from mid-late Triassic deposits of Tanganyika Territory, Tanzania. It is known from the holotype SAM-11704. The holotype and only specimen of Supradapedon was first assigned to a species of Scaphonyx (now considered to be a nomen dubium), Scaphonyx stockleyi. This species was reassigned to its own genus by Sankar Chatterjee in 1980 and the type species is Supradapedon stockleyi. One study, Langer et al. (2000), concluded that Supradapedon is a synonym of Hyperodapedon and referred it to Hyperodapedon sp. However, the provisional validity of this genus has been commonly accepted since.
