= Haupiri =

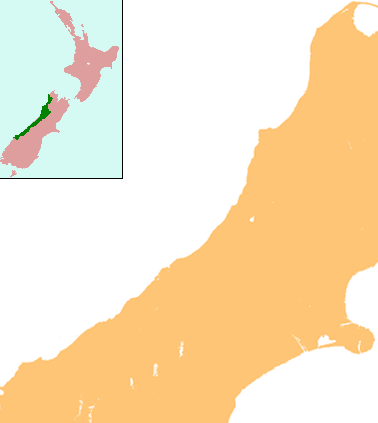
- Coordinates: 42°33′43″S 171°48′30″E
- Country: New Zealand
- Region: West Coast
- District: Grey District

Population (2013)
  - Total: 531

Haupiri is a locality in the West Coast region of New Zealand's South Island. Greymouth lies to the west. The Ahaura and Haupiri Rivers run through the area.

The population of the Haupiri Area Unit, which covered a much larger area than the locality, was 531 in the 2013 census, an increase of 150 people from 2006. Since the 2018 Census, Haupiri has been part of the Lake Brunner statistical area.

Lake Haupiri, located north of the settlement, is used for trout fishing. It has an amenity area protected under the Conservation Act 1987.

The surrounding area includes native forest, dairy farming, scrub, tussock and wetlands.

== Gloriavale Christian Community ==
Gloriavale Christian Community is a private commune, often described as a cult, based 3 kilometres (1.9 mi) south of Lake Haupiri. Established in 1990 when its members relocated from Springbank Christian Community in North Canterbury, the community of over 500 members operates a number of commercial enterprises on the large land-holding surrounding its base. The Gloriavale organisation has attracted controversy through the notoriety of its leader, Neville Cooper, subsequently known as Hopeful Christian (died 2018), who had convictions for sexual assault of community members, and its categorisation by some within the wider Christian community as a religious cult.
