= Kedron River =

Coordinates: 42°32′S 172°15′E

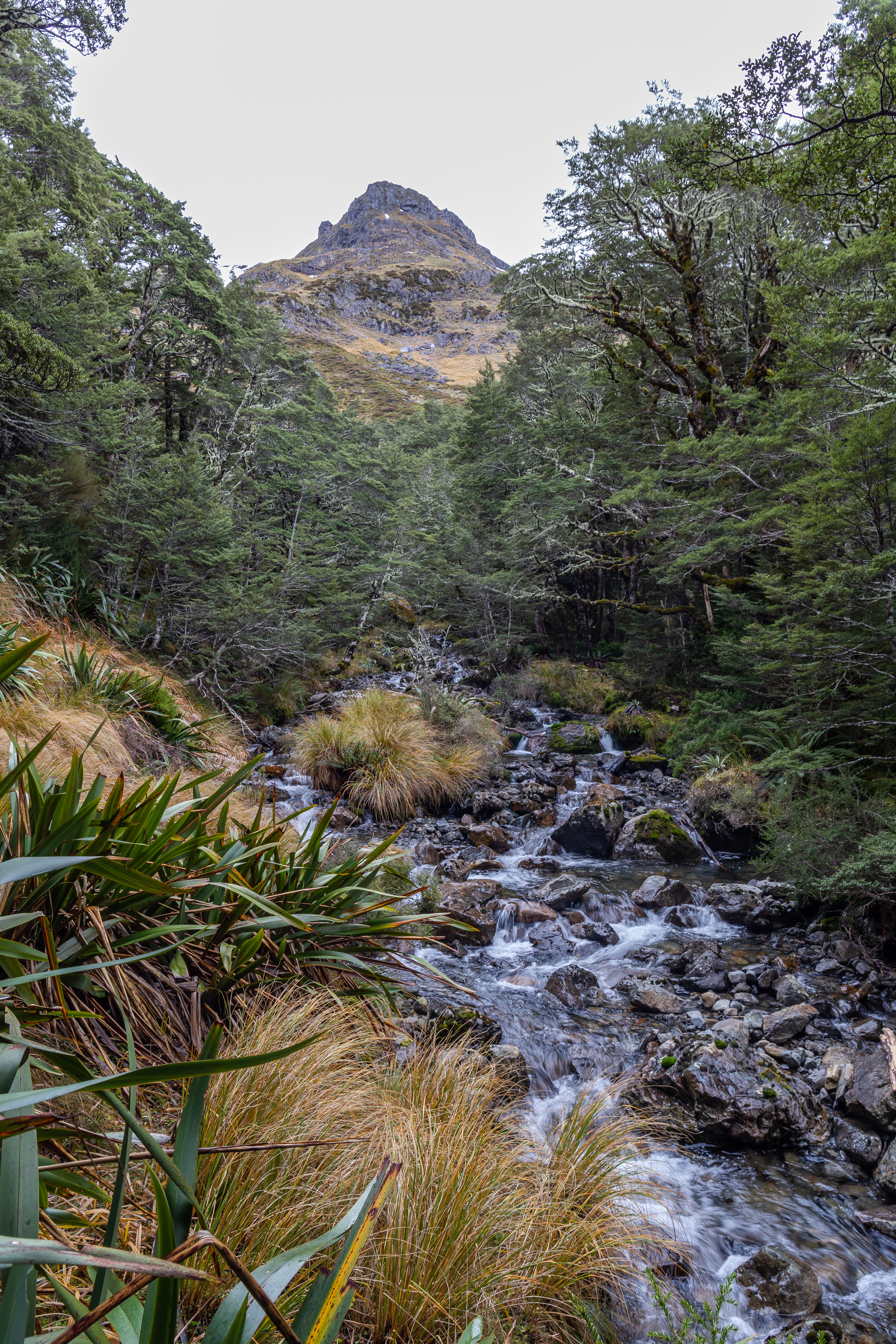

Location
- Country: New Zealand

Physical characteristics
- Source
  - location: Lake Man
- Mouth
  - location: Doubtful River
- Length: 4 km (2.5 mi)

The Kedron River is a short river of New Zealand's Southern Alps, located some 15 kilometres (9 mi) north of Lake Sumner. It flows northeast from Lake Man, close to the peak of Mount Lakeman. It reaches the Doubtful River after just 4 kilometres (2.5 mi). The river's entire length is within the Lake Sumner Forest Park. The river is one of the headwaters of the Waiau River.

== See also ==
- List of rivers of New Zealand
