= Waiheke River =

Coordinates: 42°33′S 171°58′E

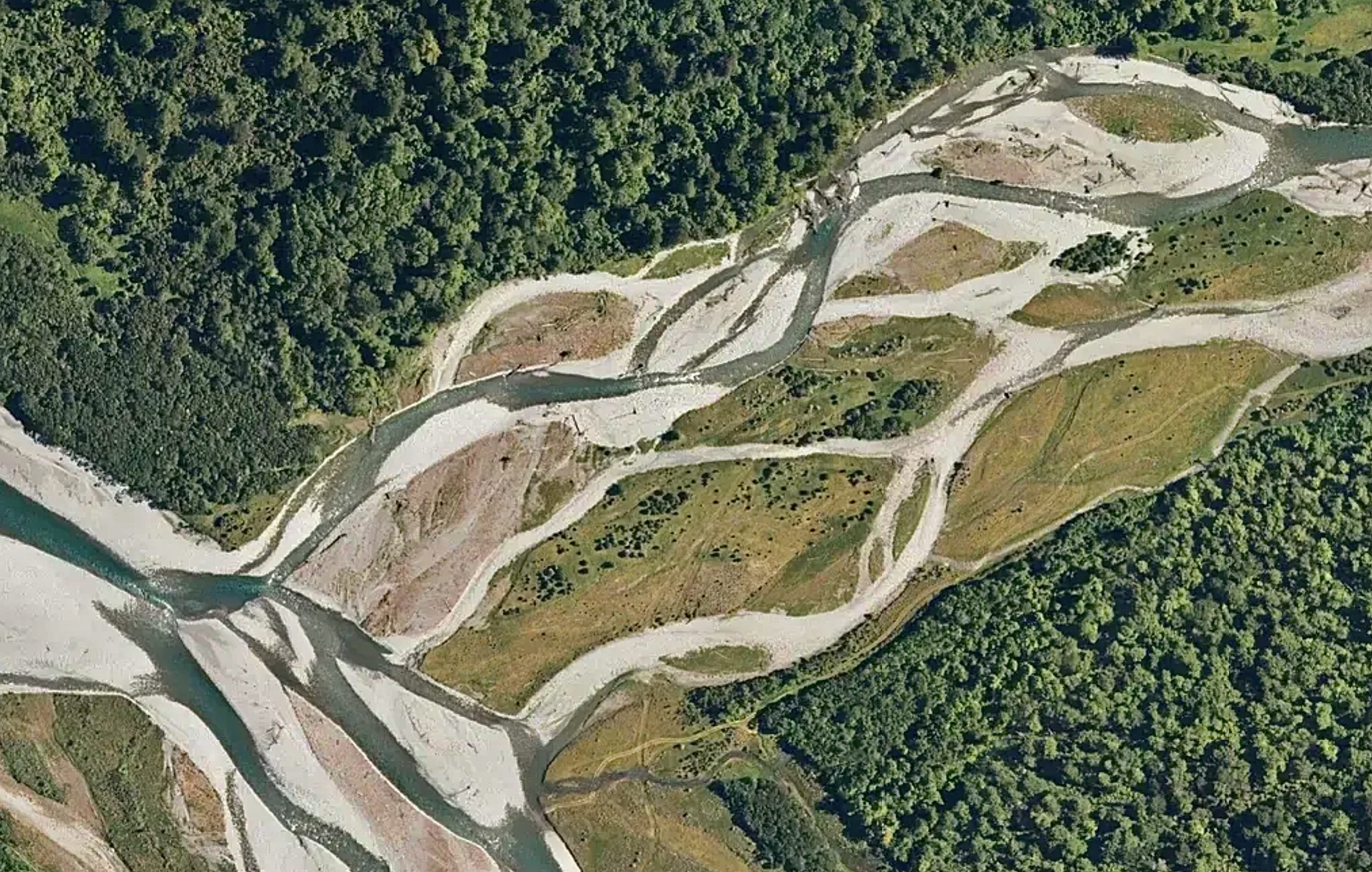
- Waiheke River (right) joins the Tūtaekurī River (bottom) to form the Ahauri River (left)

Location
- Country: New Zealand

Physical characteristics
- Source
  - location: Mount Barron
  - elevation: 1,806 m (5,925 ft)
- Mouth
  - location: Ahaura River
  - elevation: 270 m (890 ft)
- Length: 22 km (14 mi)

The Waiheke River is a river of the West Coast Region of New Zealand's South Island. It flows west from its origins on Mount Barron in the Southern Alps to reach the Ahaura River, which it forms where it joins the Tūtaekurī River, 20 kilometres northwest of Lake Sumner.

The Waiheke River flows down a long, low valley and is predominantly a shingle bed river flowing through beech forest with a margin of tussock grass along the banks. It can be kayaked, except during summer droughts.

A pack-track to Canterbury used to go through Amuri Pass into the Doubtful River Valley. It was improved by John Rochfort in 1863. A route over the 993 m (3,258 ft) Amuri Pass remains in use. Slaty Creek Hut has 4 beds, was built in 1952 by deer cullers and is now used by recreational hunters, trampers and climbers.

== See also ==
- List of rivers of New Zealand
