= Amenity area =

An amenity area is a type of New Zealand protected area.

Under the Conservation Act 1987, designated Amenity Areas must legally be managed so:

- its indigenous natural resources and its historic resources are protected
- it contributes to and allow for people to appreciate its indigenous natural resources and its historic resources
- it fosters the recreational features of the area.

Land Information New Zealand lists 16 amenity areas on its website, all in the West Coast Region:

- Lake Hanlon Amenity Area
- Inangahua West Amenity Area
- Waiuta Amenity Area
- Craigieburn Amenity Area
- Ahaura Road Amenity Area
- Nelson Creek Amenity Area
- Ahaura River East Amenity Area
- Lake Hochstetter Amenity Area
- Lake Ahaura Amenity Area
- Lake Haupiri Amenity Area
- Woods Creek Amenity Area
- Revell Terrace Amenity Area
- Three Mile Amenity Area
- Dillmanstown Amenity Area
- Shamrock Creek Amenity Area
- Milltown Amenity Area
