= Trent River =

The River Trent is a river of the English Midlands, in the United Kingdom.

Other rivers of the same name include:

- Trent River (Ontario) in Ontario, Canada
- a hamlet Trent River in the municipality of Trent Hills along Trent River (Ontario) in Ontario, Canada.
- Trent River (North Carolina) in North Carolina, United States
- Trent River (New Zealand) in New Zealand
- Trent River (Vancouver Island) on the eastern side of Vancouver Island, British Columbia, Canada
- River Piddle, in Dorset, England, sometimes archaically referred to as the Trent
