= Doubtless River =

Coordinates: 42°31′10″S 172°13′30″E

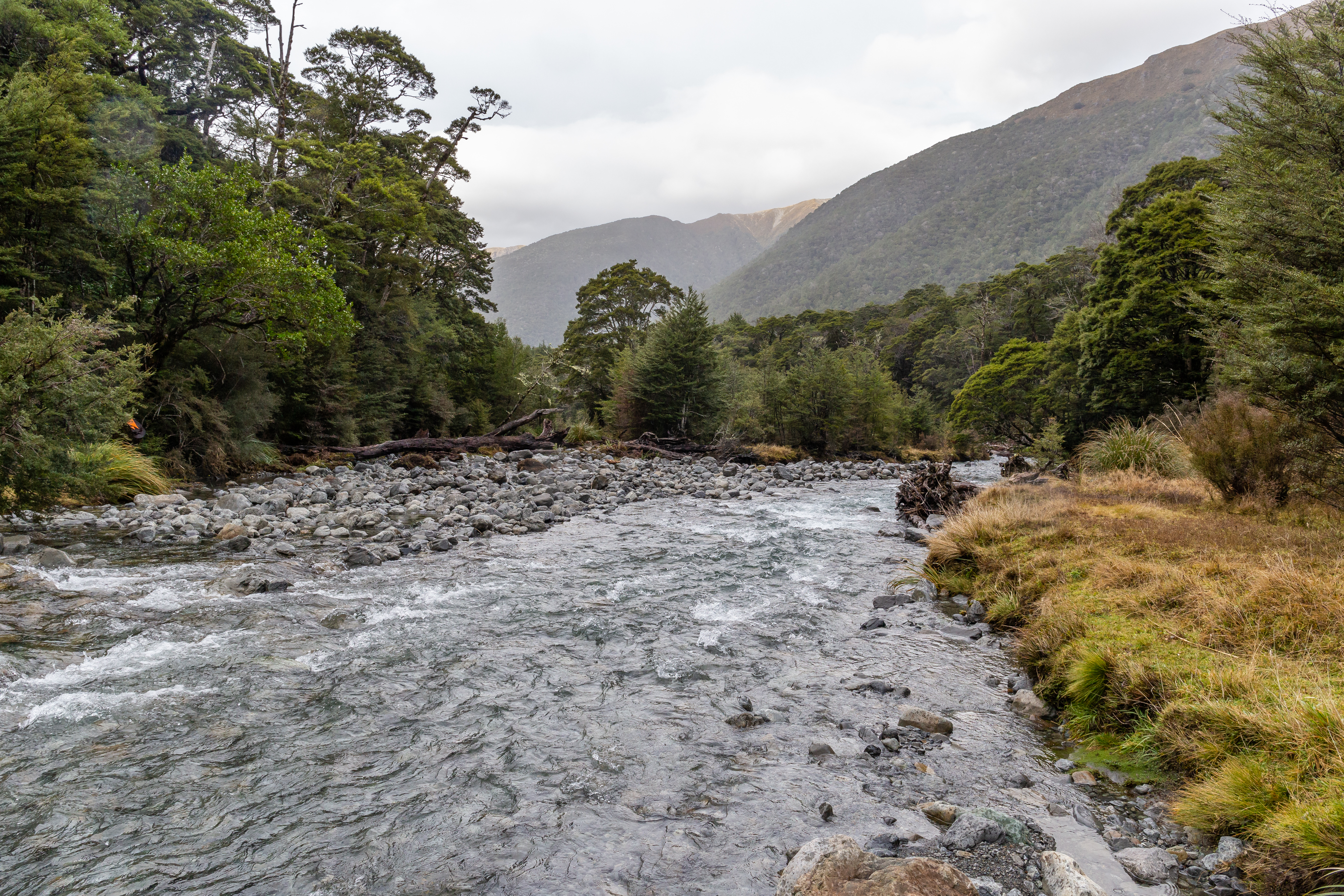

Location
- Country: New Zealand

Physical characteristics
- Source
  - location: Southern Alps
  - elevation: 1,343 m (4,406 ft)
- Mouth
  - location: Doubtful River
  - elevation: 695 m (2,280 ft)
- Length: 6 km (3.7 mi)

The Doubtless River is a river of northern Canterbury, New Zealand. A tributary of the Doubtful River, it rises south of Mount Boscawen and flows southward through the Lake Sumner Forest Park to join that river 2 kilometres (1.2 mi) east of Phantom Flat.

The New Zealand Department of Conservation maintains a backcountry hut near the junction of the Doubtless and Doubtful Rivers.

== See also ==
- List of rivers of New Zealand
