= Goodnature =

New Zealand pest control company

Goodnature Limited
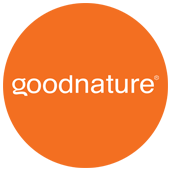
- Type: Private, benefit corporation
- Industry: Pest control
- Founded: 2005
- Founders: Robbie van Dam, Craig Bond
- Headquarters: Newtown, New Zealand
- Products: Pest traps
- Website: goodnature.co.nz

Goodnature is a New Zealand company founded in 2005 by Robbie van Dam and Craig Bond. Goodnature specializes in the production of traps designed for the control of animal pests.

== History ==
Goodnature was founded by friends Robbie van Dam and Craig Bond who met while studying industrial design at Victoria University. Van Dam had a job at the Department of Conservation (DOC) in the Biodiversity Unit building gadgets for pest control when he noticed the methods for killing pest species such as rats, stoats and possums were either inefficient or inhumane. DOC funded the development of some of their early concepts to create the traps manufactured by Goodnature today.

=== Department of Conservation partnership ===
Goodnature released the first beta self-resetting trap for rats and stoats during New Zealand Conservation Week in September 2009. The initial technology could self-reset 12 times using compressed CO_{2}. Field testing led to the development of a trap for brushtail possums, and another for rats and stoats. The company also built a lure development facility to test animal attractants as lures.

The traps were put into long-term, large-scale evaluation by DOC from 2010 to 2016. Goodnature's traps are endorsed by the Ministry of Primary Industries (MPI) for their efficiency in killing pests, and by DOC's Science and Technical team which recommends their use for conservation projects to protect New Zealand native plant and bird species.

== Goodnature Products ==
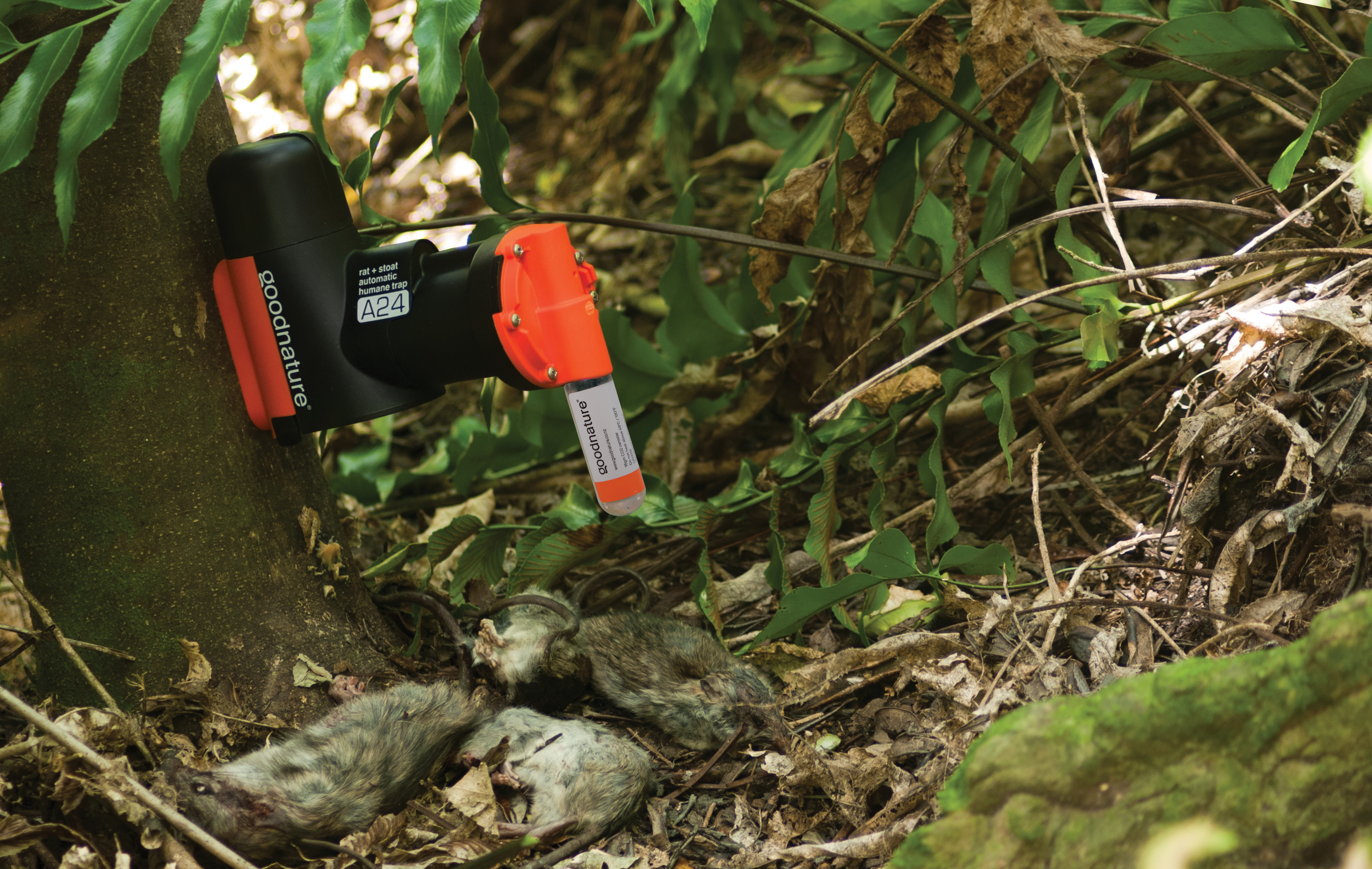
Goodnature A24 trap powered by a CO2 canister

Goodnature produces and sells two pest control devices; one for brushtail possums, and another trap for rats and stoats; it also produces toxin-free lures to target these pests.

=== Technology ===
The self-resetting traps are powered by compressed gas and use a target-specific lure to attract animals. The traps work by striking the skull of the animal with a steel-cored, glass-reinforced, polymer piston (described as a captive bolt), killing it almost instantly. This piston is driven by compressed CO_{2} when the animal triggers the trap. Once the animal has been struck, the piston returns, dropping the animal to the ground and resetting the trap. The traps have achieved the Class A standard for humaneness as set out in the MPI's National Animal Welfare Advisory Committee's guidelines. This is the only possum trap ever to have met this standard. The A24 also meets the United Kingdom's Spring Traps Approval Order.

=== Awards ===
In 2016, Goodnature's A24 rat and stoat trap and automatic lure pump won Best Effect at the Design Institute of New Zealand for improving DOC's capability in New Zealand forests. It also received the supreme Purple Pin which is given to work that raises the bar of New Zealand design. Both Goodnature's A24 and A12 traps have won the Non-Consumer, Sustainable Product Design and Best Effect awards at the design institute's Best Awards since 2011.

== Usage ==
=== Conservation usage ===
Goodnature's traps have been used in New Zealand in projects by DOC, city and regional councils, community groups, and households.

DOC has used Goodnature traps on Native Island, Southland, at Harts Hill in Fiordland National Park, at Boundary Stream, Hawkes Bay, Te Urewera Mainland Island, and at Abel Tasman National Park In June 2017, 1200 stoat traps were installed on 11,400 hectares of the Haast Kiwi Sanctuary to protect tokoeka kiwi, as part of the department's Battle For Our Birds programme. In the same programme, DOC also increased the number of stoat traps in Arthur's Pass National Park and Lake Sumner Forest Park in an effort to save one of New Zealand's rarest parakeets (orange-fronted parakeet) from extinction. In January 2017, the kiwi sanctuary at Rimutaka Forest Park was doubled in size to 7000 hectares to aid the regeneration of New Zealand's North Island brown kiwi. A total of 1200 Goodnature traps were laid down to reduce the number of stoats at the park that prey on kiwi.

The traps were a key tool behind a rodent control program at Maria Langa Cay, Puerto Rico in 2014 chosen to avoid the use of rodenticide on the island, which is a nesting site for the endangered hawksbill sea turtle and home to the brown pelican.

The traps are also used in conservation projects throughout Hawaii including in Kalaupapa National Historical Park in Oahu, in the Waianae and Ko'olau mountain ranges of Oahu, and on the island of Lanai.

The company has also developed targeted devices for the introduced mongoose in Hawaii, the introduced American mink in Finland and Sweden, and the introduced grey squirrel in the United Kingdom. The company's traps are now used in more than 25 countries including: the United States, Canada, England, Denmark, Sweden, Norway, Finland, Scotland, Ireland, France, Spain, Italy, Portugal and Australia.
