= Tūtaekurī River (West Coast) =

River in New Zealand

Coordinates: 42.56260°S 171.98074°E

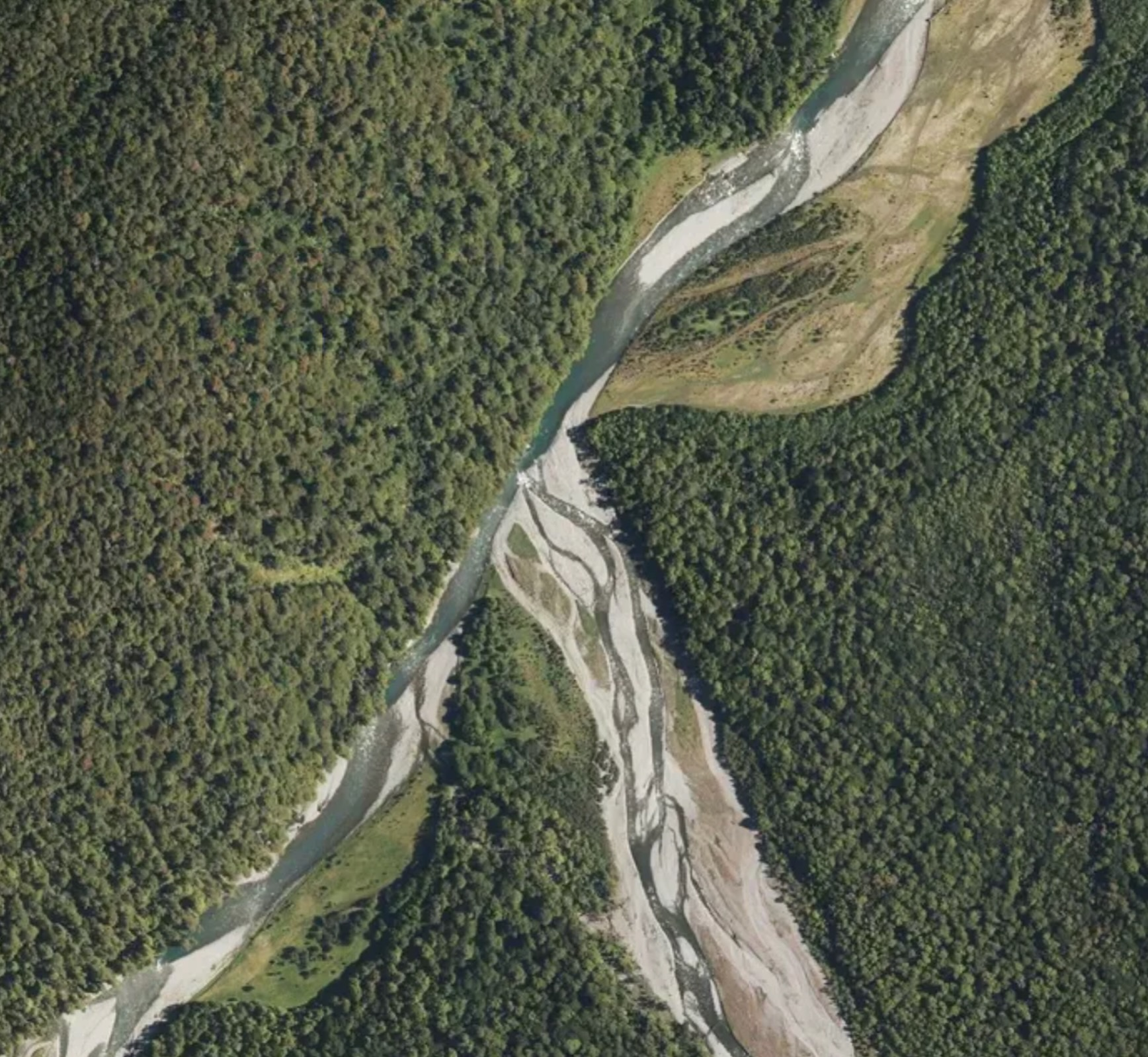
- Trent River (left) joins the Tūtaekurī River

Location
- Country: New Zealand

Physical characteristics
- Source
  - location: Southern Alps
  - elevation: 1,600 m (5,200 ft)
- Mouth
  - location: Ahaura River
  - elevation: 270 m (890 ft)
- Length: 25 km (16 mi)

Basin features
- Tributaries
  - left: Trent River

The Tūtaekurī River starts near the Hope Pass, in the Southern Alps and flows north-west to join the Ahaura River. The Ahaura joins the Grey River which flows to the Tasman Sea at Greymouth. Tūtaekurī River has been its official name since 21 June 2019. Tūtae kurī is a grass with the latin name agropyron multiflorum.

The Tūtaekurī flows down a long, low valley and is predominantly a shingle bed river flowing through beech forest with a margin of tussock grass along the banks. It can be kayaked, except during summer droughts.

A pack-track ran to Canterbury via the 951 m (3,120 ft) Hope Pass and the Hope River. In 1875 it was the route recommended for what later became the Midland Railway, on a route further southwest. It was still being considered in 1887. A route is still used over the pass, taking about 7 hours for the walk to Top Hope Hut from Tutaekuri Hut. Tutaekuri Hut has 6 beds, is 371 m (1,217 ft) above sea level and was built in 2008 to replace a hut about 20 minutes downstream, at the Trent River confluence. A 4x4 track runs to the hut, but is often washed out at the river crossings. In the opposite direction, the Elizabeth Hut on the Haupiri River can be reached in about 9 hours, via the 1,071 m (3,514 ft) Trent Saddle, on the Elizabeth Hut Route.

The valley is part of the West Coast Divide TB Management Area, where pigs, deer and possums are controlled to minimise the spread of tuberculosis.

== See also ==
- List of rivers of New Zealand
