= National Parks Act 1980 (New Zealand) =

Act of Parliament in New Zealand

New Zealand Parliament
- Long title: An Act to consolidate and amend the law relating to national parks
- Royal assent: 17 December 1980
- Commenced: 1 April 1981

Legislative history
- Passed: 1980

Related legislation
- Conservation Act 1987; National Parks Act 1952 (repealed)
- Status: Current legislation

The National Parks Act is an Act of Parliament passed in New Zealand in 1980. It repealed the National Parks Act 1952.

== See also ==
- National parks in New Zealand
- Tramping in New Zealand
- Lists of acts of the New Zealand Parliament
