= National parks of New Zealand =

Map of New Zealand with the national parks marked in green

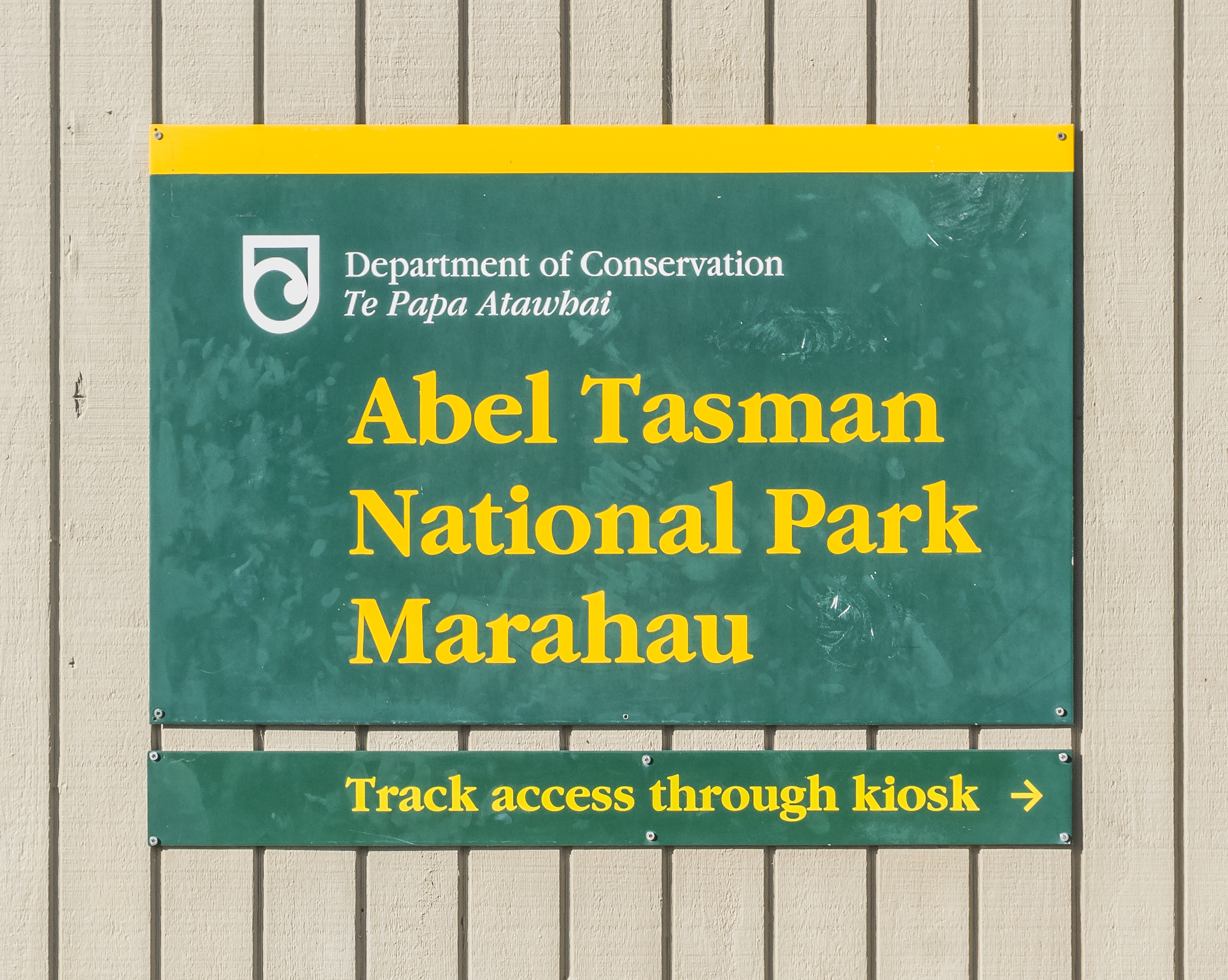
DOC information board in Abel Tasman National Park

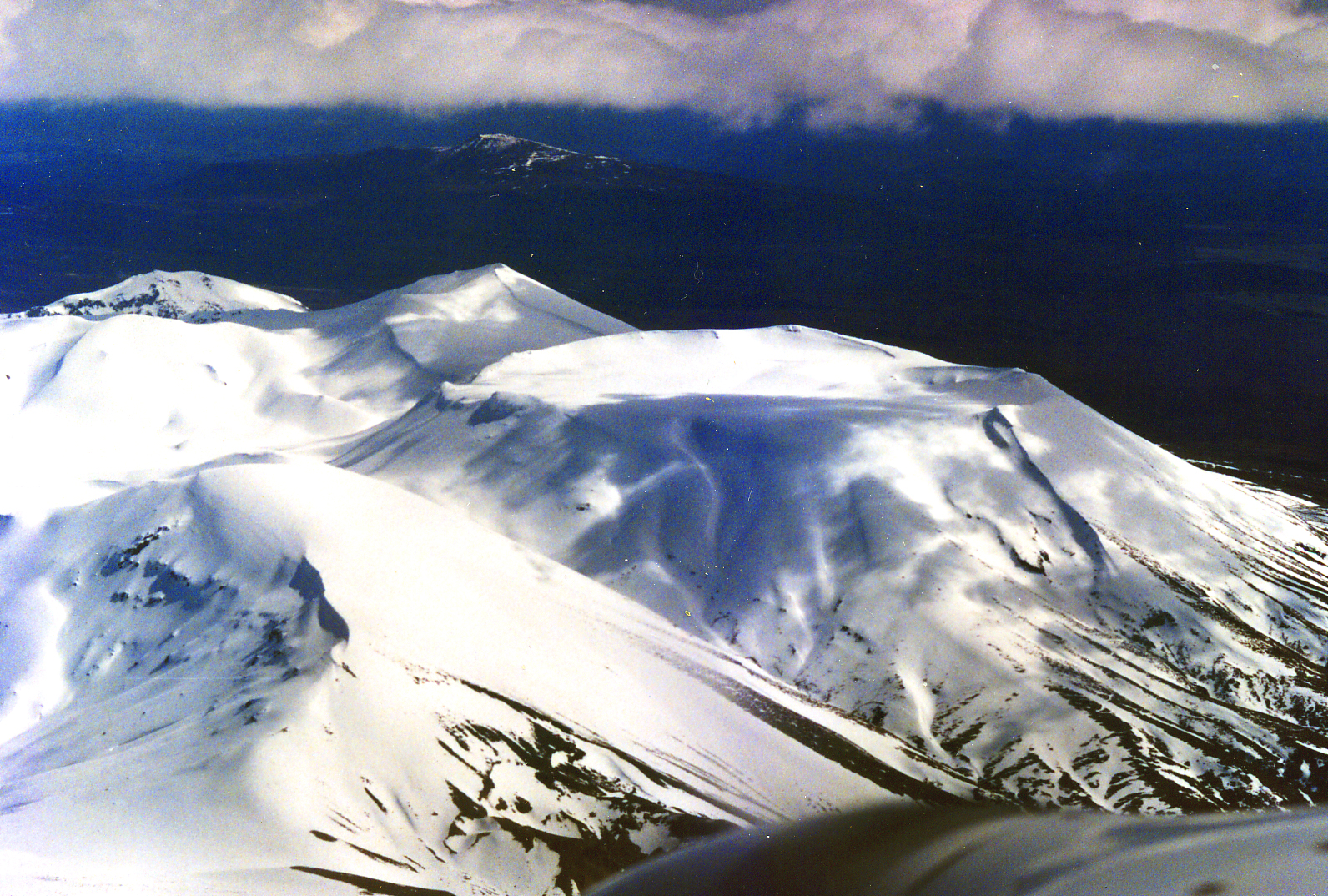
Mount Tongariro in winter, Tongariro National Park

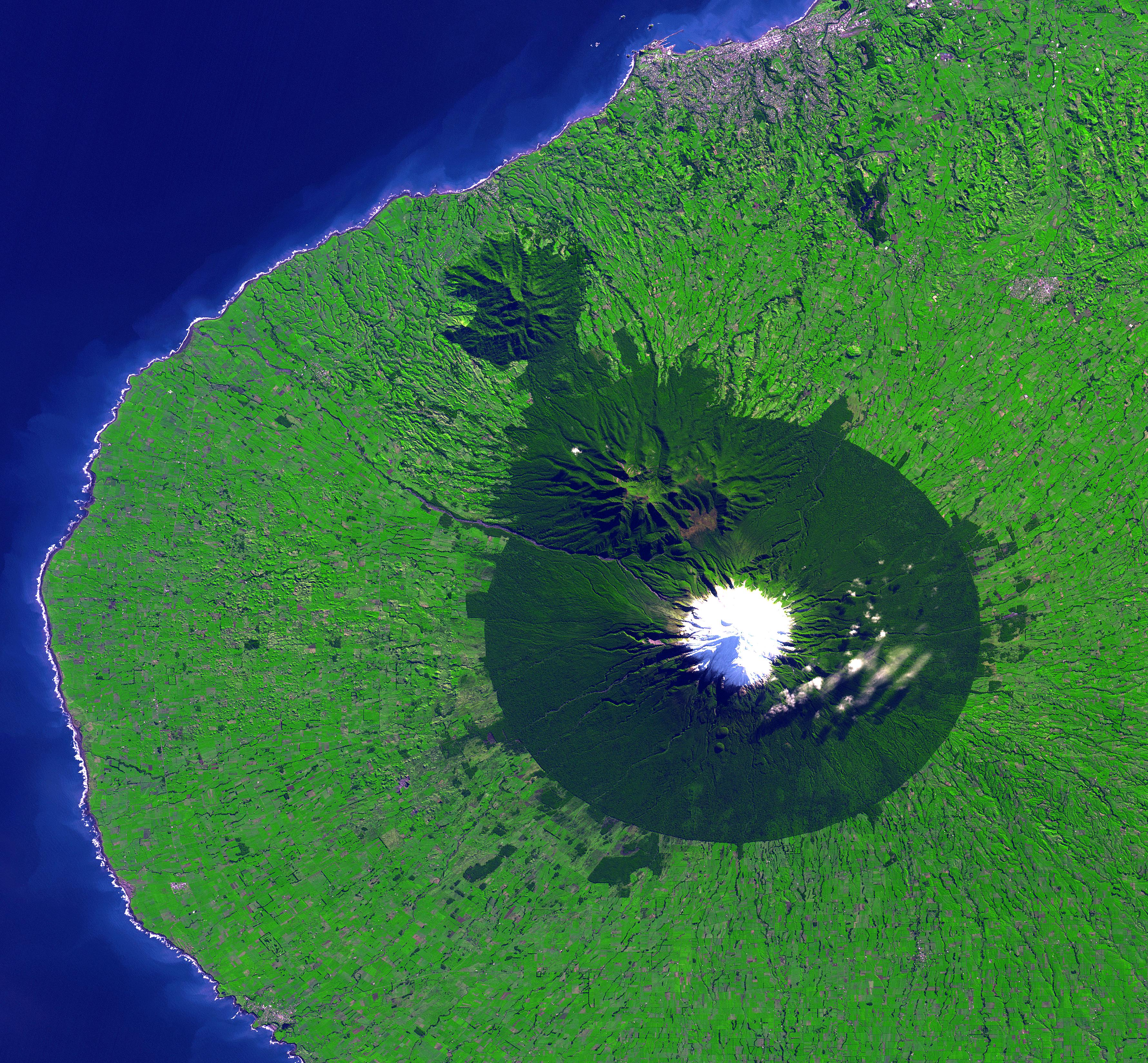
Satellite photo of Egmont National Park (the forested area)

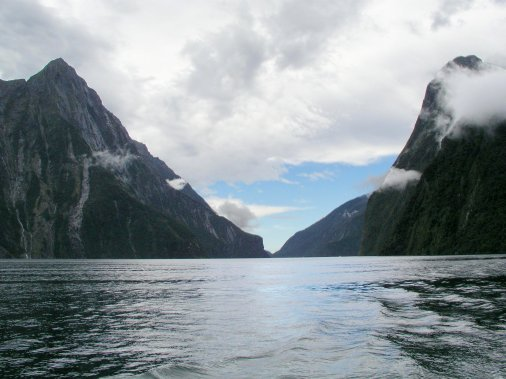
Tourist attraction Milford Sound, the most famous of the fiords in Fiordland National Park

The national parks of New Zealand are protected natural areas administered by the Department of Conservation (DOC). The first national parks established in the country were all focused on mountain scenery. Since the 1980s the focus has been on developing a more diverse representation of New Zealand landscapes. The parks are all culturally significant and many also contain historic features. Tongariro National Park is one of the World Heritage Sites that are of both cultural and natural significance, while four of the South Island national parks form Te Wahipounamu, another World Heritage Site. There are currently 13 national parks; a 14th, Te Urewera National Park, was disestablished in 2014.

The national parks are administered by the Department of Conservation "for the benefit, use, and enjoyment of the public". They are popular tourist destinations, with three-tenths of overseas tourists visiting at least one national park during their stay in New Zealand.

== Legislation ==
The National Parks Act of 1980 was established in order to codify the purpose, governance and selection of national parks. It begins by establishing the definition of a national park:

It is hereby declared that the provisions of this Act shall have effect for the purpose of preserving in perpetuity as national parks, for their intrinsic worth and for the benefit, use, and enjoyment of the public, areas of New Zealand that contain scenery of such distinctive quality, ecological systems, or natural features so beautiful, unique, or scientifically important that their preservation is in the national interest.

— National Parks Act 1980, Part 1, section 4, subsection 1

The National Parks Act goes on to state that the public will have freedom of entry and access to the parks, though this is subject to restrictions to ensure the preservation of native plants and animals and the welfare of the parks in general. Access to specially protected areas (550 km^{2}) constituted under the act is by permit only. Under the Act, national parks are to be maintained in their natural state as far as possible to retain their value as soil, water and forest conservation areas. Native plants and animals are to be preserved and introduced plants and animals removed if their presence interferes with the natural wildlife. Development in wilderness areas established under the act is restricted to foot tracks and huts used for wild animal control or scientific research.

=== Services available for public use ===
The National Parks Act allows the Department of Conservation to provide hostels, huts, camping grounds, ski tows and similar facilities, parking areas, roading and tracks within the parks. In addition to these, the department also provides some accommodation, transport and other services at entry points to the parks, but these are also offered by other government agencies, voluntary organisations and private firms. More comprehensive services within the parks, such as guided walks and skiing tutorials, are privately provided with concessions from the department.

=== 2018 Supreme Court decision ===
In 2018, the Auckland iwi Ngāi Tai ki Tāmaki won a case in the Supreme Court, allowing them to apply to the Department of Conservation for exclusive rights for concessions to run commercial operations on Motutapu and Rangitoto islands. The court decision was based on giving effect to principles within the Treaty of Waitangi and recognition that although the islands are administered by the Department of Conservation, Ngāi Tai ki Tāmaki has traditional ownership (mana whenua). This decision had implications for the Department of Conservation management plans for the conservation estate, including the National Parks, and led to a pause in the review of the management plans for Aoraki / Mount Cook National Park and Westland Tai Poutini National Park.

== List of national parks ==
This table lists the current and former national parks in alphabetical order.

* Green shading and asterisk – Parks which form part of a UNESCO designated World Heritage Site

National park	Image	Area		Established	Location	Number of DOC huts	Description
National park	Image	km^{2}	sq mi	Established	Location	Number of DOC huts	Description
Abel Tasman National Park		237	92	1942	40°50′S 172°54′E	7	The smallest national park, this tourist destination has numerous tidal inlets and beaches of golden sand along the shores of Tasman Bay. "Doing the Abel Tasman" as a tramping or kayaking journey is a common activity.
Aoraki / Mount Cook National Park*		722	279	1953	43°44′S 170°6′E	16	An alpine park containing New Zealand's highest mountain, Aoraki / Mount Cook (3,724 m) and its longest glacier, Haupapa / Tasman Glacier (29 km). A hotspot for mountaineering, ski touring and scenic flights, the park is an area of outstanding natural beauty.
Arthur's Pass National Park		1,185	458	1929	42°57′S 171°34′E	28	A rugged and mountainous area straddling the main divide of the Southern Alps.
Egmont National Park		342	132	1900	39°16′S 174°6′E	8	This park comprises the land about a nine-kilometre radius of Mount Taranaki and some outlying areas to the north. The symmetrical cone of the dormant volcano is a provincial landmark.
Fiordland National Park*		12,607	4,868	1952	45°25′S 167°43′E	51	The largest national park in New Zealand and one of the largest in the world, the park covers the southwest corner of the South Island. The park's scenery, with its deep fiords, its glacial lakes, its mountains and waterfalls, make it a popular tourist destination.
Kahurangi National Park		4,529	1,749	1996	41°15′S 172°7′E	51	Situated in the north-west of the South Island, Kahurangi contains spectacular and remote country, including the well-used Heaphy Track. Ancient landforms and unique flora and fauna add to the value of New Zealand's second largest national park.
Mount Aspiring National Park*		3,562	1,375	1964	44°23′S 168°44′E	19	A complex of glaciated mountain scenery centred on Mount Aspiring / Tititea (3,033 metres (9,951 ft)), New Zealand's highest peak outside of Aoraki/Mt Cook National Park.
Nelson Lakes National Park		1,019	393	1956	41°49′9″S 172°50′15″E	20	A rugged, mountainous area in the Tasman District, south of Nelson. It extends southwards from the forested shores of Lakes Rotoiti and Rotoroa to the Lewis Pass National Reserve.
Paparoa National Park		430	170	1987	42°5′S 171°30′E	2	On the West Coast of the South Island between Westport and Greymouth. It includes the Pancake Rocks at Punakaiki.
Rakiura National Park		1,400	540	2002	46°54′S 168°7′E	24	Covering about 85% of Stewart Island / Rakiura, this is the newest of the national parks.
Te Urewera National Park (disestablished 2014)		2,127	821	1954	38°45′S 177°9′E	29	Together with neighbouring Whirinaki Te Pua-a-Tāne Conservation Park, Te Urewera is the largest remaining stand of native forest in the North Island. Lake Waikaremoana, is noted for its scenic shoreline. Since 2014 it has been a protected area meeting the International Union for Conservation of Nature criteria for Category II – National Park, but it is no longer a national park, instead being run under a special agreement between the Crown and the Tūhoe iwi.
Tongariro National Park*		786	303	1887	39°12′S 175°35′E	10	New Zealand's first national park, recognised as one of the 27 World Heritage Sites that are of both outstanding natural and cultural value. Gifted to the Crown by Te Heuheu Tūkino IV, the park includes several sacred Māori sites and three active volcanoes, Ruapehu, Ngauruhoe and Tongariro.
Westland Tai Poutini National Park*		1,320	510	1960	43°23′S 170°11′E	12	Extends from the highest peaks of the Southern Alps to a wild remote coastline. Included in the park are glaciers, scenic lakes and dense rainforest, as well as remains of old gold mining towns along the coast.
Whanganui National Park		742	286	1986	39°35′S 175°5′E	5	Bordering the Whanganui River, it incorporates areas of Crown land, former state forest and a number of former reserves.

== Proposed national parks ==
The area centred on Waipoua Forest, north of Dargaville, has been proposed as a possible Kauri National Park. The area contains most of New Zealand's remaining kauri, including the largest known kauri, Tāne Mahuta. These stands of kauri are also valuable as havens for endangered species including the North Island brown kiwi. This proposal is currently being investigated by the Department of Conservation.

In response to a DoC proposal to upgrade the protection of Great Barrier Island (Aotea), Forest and Bird launched a campaign in 2014 to designate it as a national park.

In 2020, the New Zealand National Party announced that they would create two new national parks if elected at the general election, namely Coromandel National Park and Catlins National Park.

== Mining concerns ==
In 2010 the New Zealand Government proposed removing some national park and conservation areas from Schedule 4 protection of the Crown Minerals Act which prohibits mining in those areas. In July the government abandoned the proposal after receiving a large number of submissions, most of which opposed mining.

== See also ==
- Protected areas of New Zealand
- List of national parks for other national parks around the world
- Regional parks of New Zealand
- Forest parks of New Zealand
