= Trent River (New Zealand) =

Coordinates: 42.605423°S 171.959742°E

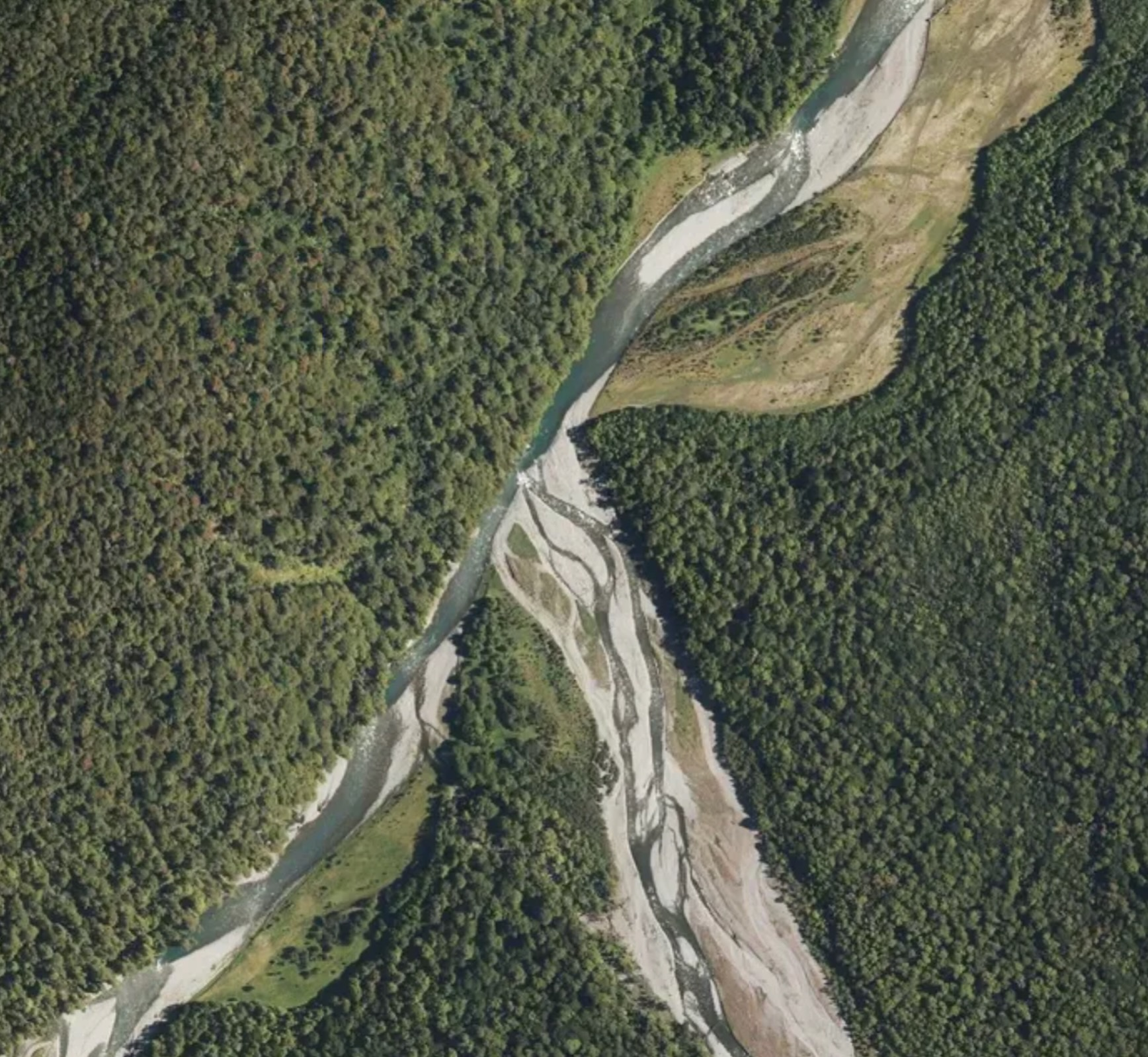
- Trent River (left) joins the Tūtaekurī River

Location
- Country: New Zealand

Physical characteristics
- Source
  - location: Kaimata Range
  - elevation: 1,747 m (5,732 ft)
- Mouth
  - location: Ahaura River
  - elevation: 330 m (1,080 ft)
- Length: 28 km (17 mi)

The Trent River is a river of the West Coast Region of New Zealand's South Island. It flows east from its source in the Kaimata Range northeast of Otira, turning north to reach the valley of the Ahaura River via the Tūtaekurī River.

The Trent River is braided and flows through beech forest. It can be kayaked, except during summer droughts.

There are two 4-bed backcountry huts in the Trent valley, the Top- and Mid-Trent Huts. Elizabeth Hut on the Haupiri River can be reached via the Trent valley in about 9 hours from Tutaekuri Hut, via the 1,071 m (3,514 ft) Trent Saddle, on the Elizabeth Hut Route.

== See also ==
- List of rivers of New Zealand
