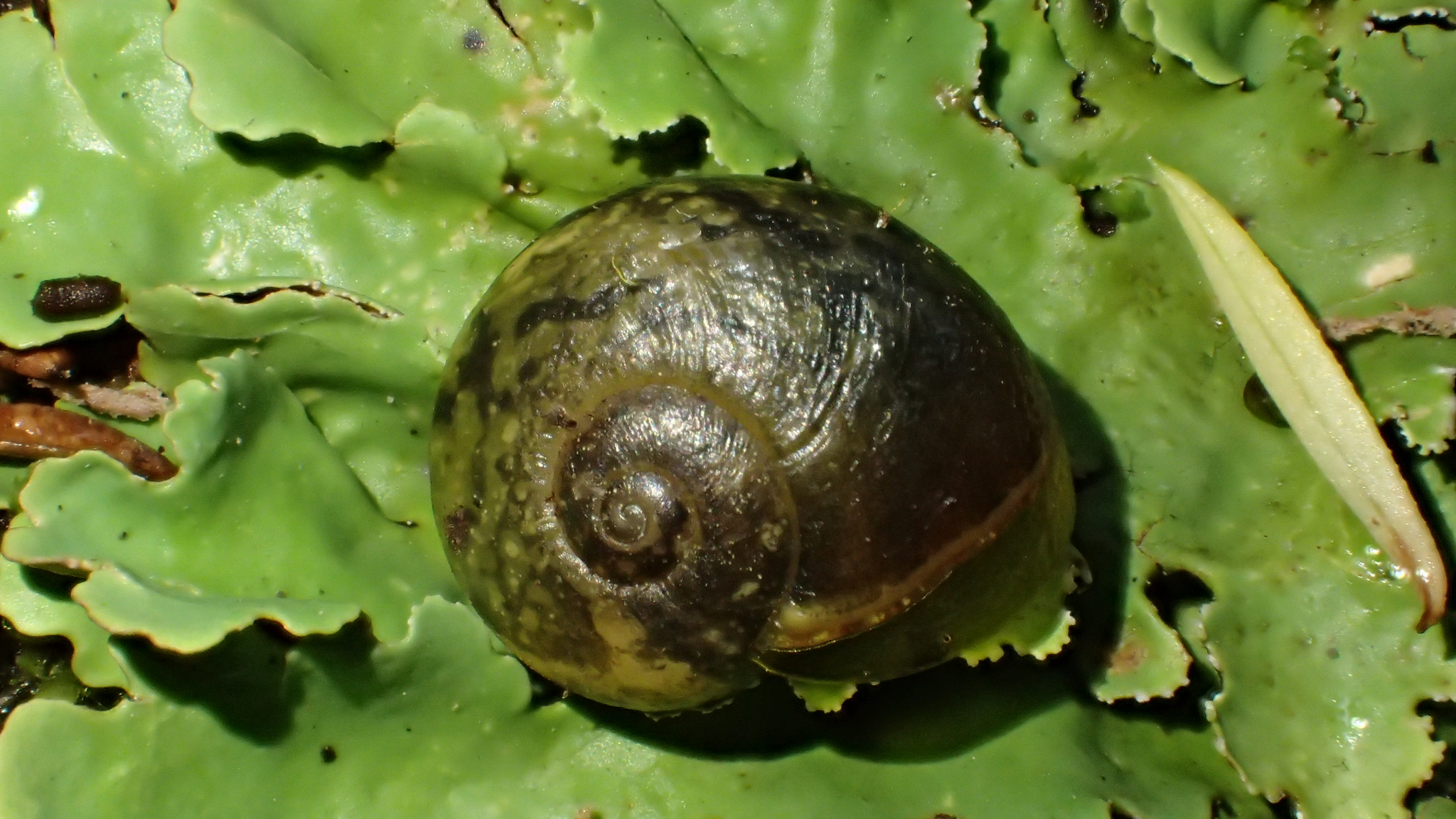

Scientific classification
- Kingdom: Animalia
- Phylum: Mollusca
- Class: Gastropoda
- Order: Stylommatophora
- Family: Rhytididae
- Genus: Rhytida
- Species: R. australis

Binomial name
- Rhytida australis Hutton, 1883

= Rhytida australis =

Species of gastropod

Rhytida australis is a species of small, air-breathing land snail, a terrestrial pulmonate gastropod mollusc in the family Rhytididae.

== Distribution ==
This species is endemic to Stewart Island in New Zealand. They are also in Native Island, which is an island off the east coast of Stewart Island.

== Life cycle ==
The dimensions of the eggs of Rhytida australis are 2.75 × 2.25, 2.75 × 2, 2.75 × 2.25 mm.
