= Nancy River =

Location
- Country: New Zealand

Physical characteristics
- Mouth: Ahaura River
  - coordinates: 42°31′51″S 171°50′41″E
- Length: 15 km (9.3 mi)

The Nancy River is a river of the West Coast Region of New Zealand's South Island. A tributary of the Ahaura River, it flows generally southwest from its source to the west of Mount Hochstsetter in the Southern Alps, turning west shortly before its outflow, 15 kilometres southeast of Lake Hochstetter.

== See also ==
- List of rivers of New Zealand
