= Ulva Island-Te Wharawhara Marine Reserve =

Marine reserve in New Zealand territorial waters

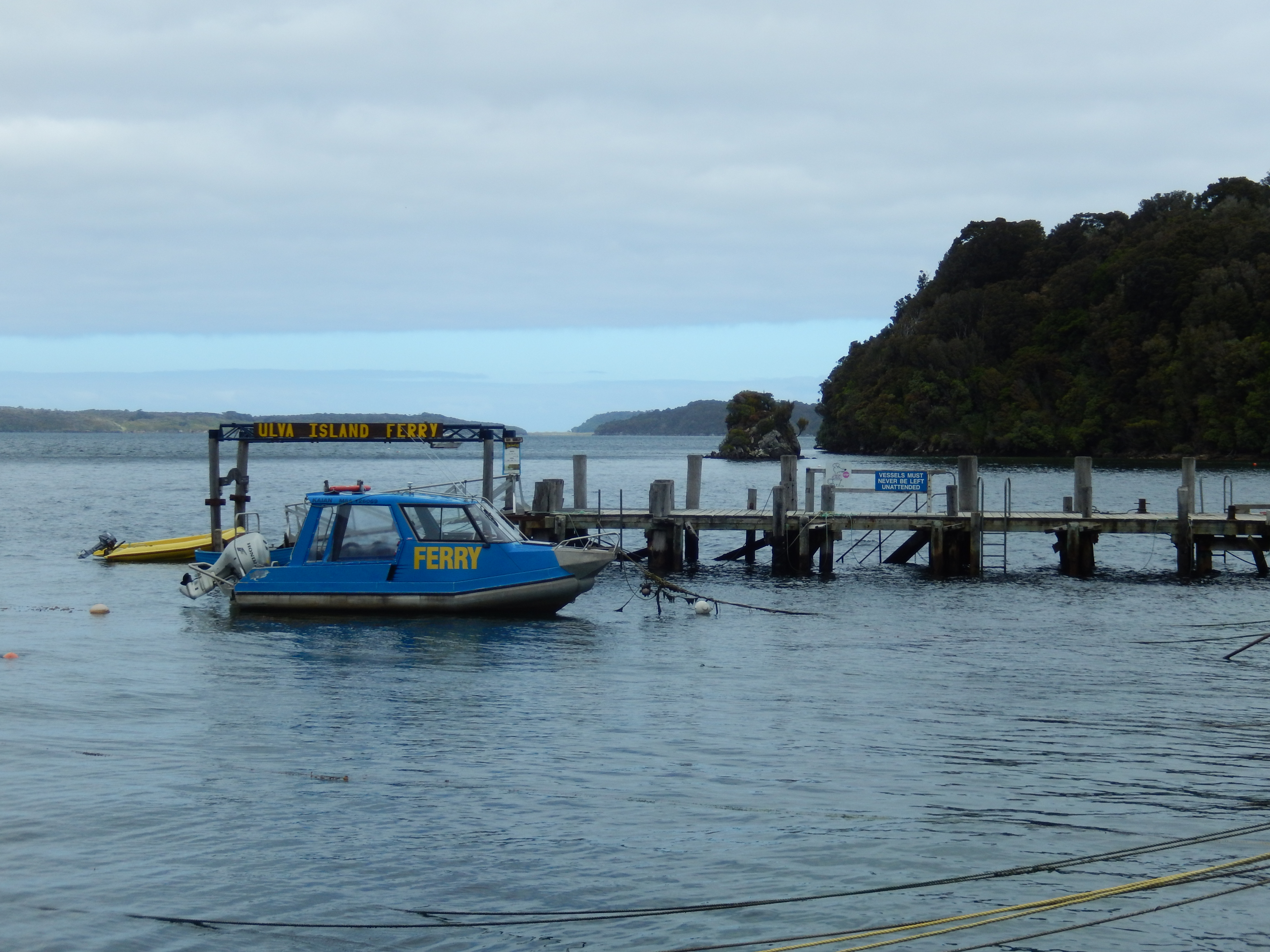
- The marine reserve includes areas between Ulva Island in the foreground and Native Island in the background

- Location within South Island
- Location: Southland, New Zealand
- Coordinates: 46.9162378°S 168.017473°E
- Area: 1,075 hectares (2,660 acres)
- Established: 2004
- Governing body: Department of Conservation

Ulva Island-Te Wharawhara Marine Reserve is a marine reserve covering an area of 1,075 hectares (2,660 acres) south-west and north-east of Ulva Island, in the Paterson Inlet of New Zealand's Stewart Island. It was established in 2004 and is administered by the Department of Conservation.

== Geography ==
The reserve covers about 15% of Paterson Inlet (Whaka ā Te Wera), a submerged ancient river valley. The rivers flowing into it drain from pristine undeveloped land with little sediment and nutrient run-off, and warm subtropical and cool Antarctic waters mix in the currents of Stewart Island. The combination of factors provides a habitat for a range of plants and animals including at least 56 species of marine fish.

The inlet is one of the largest sheltered harbours in southern New Zealand.

== History ==
The marine reserve was established in 2004, receiving legal recognition on 13 December of that year.

The rest of Paterson Inlet was designated Te Whaka a Te Wera Mätaitai Reserve on 31 December 2004 to promote sustainable management of the inlet's fisheries resources and provide for customary food gathering by Maori. It is closed off to non-commercial fishing.

A fisher was fined for taking two blue cod from the reserve in December 2012.

In 2019 the ecosystem of the marine reserve was in good health.

== Flora and fauna ==
Brachiopod (lamp shells), an ancient filter-feeding shellfish that live on both rock and sediment, thrive in the inlet at depths of less than 20 metres. These shellfish were abundant in prehistoric oceans 300 to 550 million years ago, but are now relatively rare. The inlet is one of the most accessible viewing spots for the shellfish in the world.

Kina, sea cucumbers and starfish also thrive in the inlet waters. Divers also encounter carpet shark, Banded Wrasse, Stewart Island blue cod and lion's mane jellyfish.

The inlet also has the widest variety of seaweed in New Zealand, including 56 brown, 31 green and 174 red species. The seaweed forests provide a habitat for a diverse range of fish, invertebrates and marine mammals. Meadows of small red seaweed grow on the sand, helping to stabilise the sediment while providing an important shelter for scallops and surface for spat and larvae. There is also a forest of giant kelp (Macrocystis pyrifera).

Fur seals, sea lions and yellow-eyed penguins often visit the inlet.

== Recreation ==
The marine reserve is used for snorkelling, boating and kayaking, with clear waters teeming with fish, penguins and a variety of marine flora. There are several boat launching ramps at Oban.

According to the Department of Conservation, snorkelling is best at a depth of 5 to 12 metres, off the north end of Sydney Cove beach on Ulva Island. A wetsuit, flashlight and dive knife is recommended due to the kelp forests and cold sea temperatures. The southern side of the island is best for kayaking and canoeing.

Catch bags, fishing spears and fishing are banned in the reserve. Boats must take care when anchoring to avoid damaging the sea floor.

The Ulva Island beaches are a 10-minute boat or water taxi ride from Golden Bay, and via well-formed gravel tracks on the island: Sydney Cove is a five-minute walk from the Ulva Island Wharf; Boulder Beach is a 30-minute walk across the island.

== See also ==
- Marine reserves of New Zealand
