= Ahaura River =

River in the South Island of New Zealand

Coordinates: 42°21′S 171°31′E

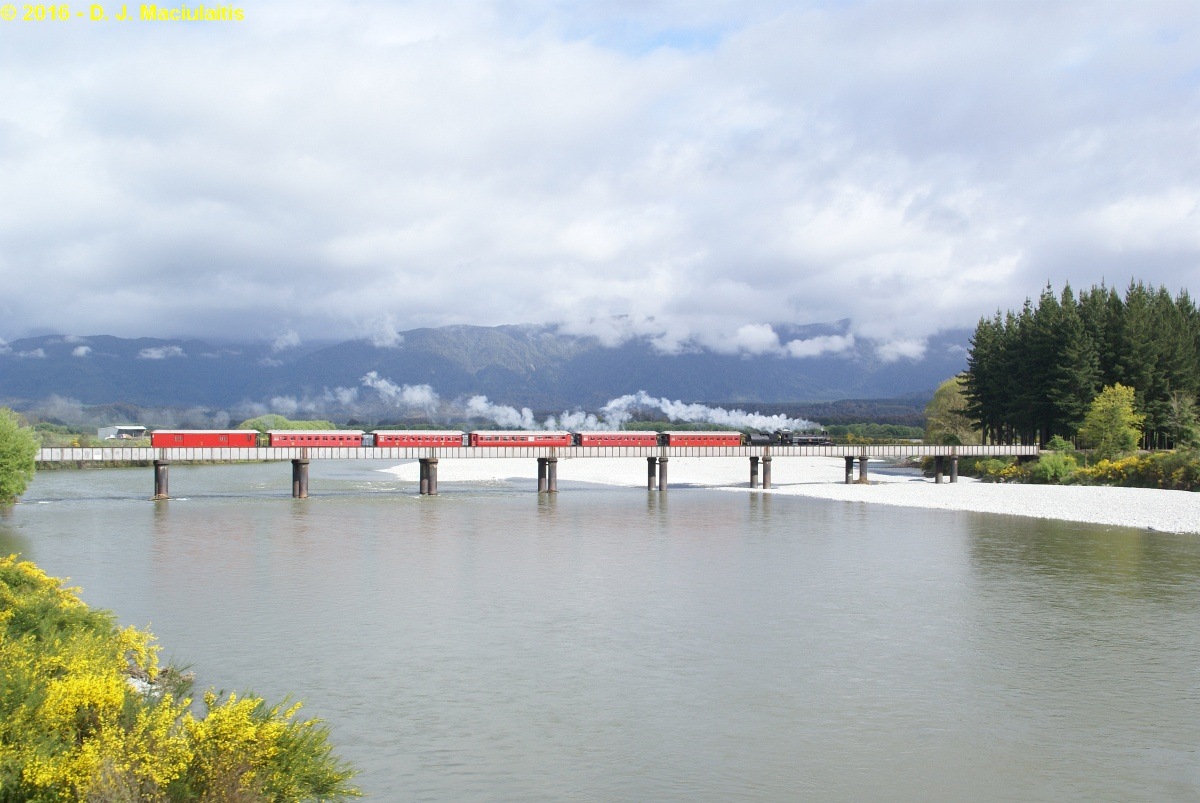
- Ahaura River Bridge

Location
- Country: New Zealand

Physical characteristics
- Source
  - location: Tūtaekurī River and Waiheke River
  - elevation: 270 m (890 ft)
- Mouth
  - location: Ahaura River
  - elevation: 40 m (130 ft)
- Length: 65 km (40 mi)

The Ahaura River is in the South Island of New Zealand. This river drains the western flanks of the Southern Alps and flows into the Grey River.

The Ahaura and its many tributaries rise in the Lake Sumner State Forest park and enters the Grey River at the small settlement of Ahaura approximately 30 km upstream from Greymouth. It drains a huge area of land and in its lower reaches below the Haupiri confluence can have a tea-colour stain for much of the year. The reaches above the junction with the Haupiri tend to have very clear water however for much of the year.

Other rivers in the catchment are the Nancy, Trent, Tūtaekurī and Waiheke Rivers. They can all be kayaked, except in late summer and they are the most used rivers on the West Coast. The lower gorge has remnants of Chinese miners' gold diggings. Pack-tracks to Canterbury used to go through Amuri Pass into the Doubtful River Valley and by the Tūtaekurī to the Hope River. The Ahaura above the gorge is a wide, fast, shallow, braided river, with extensive grassy flats, surrounded by beech forest. Earthquake Rapid, is the largest rapid on the river. A 1981 survey described the scenic and recreational values of the gorge as exceptional.

The river is only bridged by the Stillwater–Ngākawau Line and SH7. A punt operated across the river from 1871 to 1879, when it was replaced by a bridge. The first railway bridge opened in 1890.

At the gorge the Ahaura's 7-day mean annual low flow is 26.45 m^{3} (934 cu ft) per second, the mean flow 99.77 m^{3} (3,523 cu ft) and the maximum recorded flow 3,972.06 m^{3} (140,272 cu ft). On 26 December 1957 the flood gauge at the SH7 bridge reached 7.35 m (24.1 ft). The river's catchment is 870 km^{2} (340 sq mi).

Gold digging started about 1865 and a small settlement of shanties had been built at Ahauru by January 1866. 3,300 were reported to be at work in the area by March 1866 and a bridle path had been formed.

The Ahaura Terraces and Nancys Clearing Ecological Areas were declared in 1997 to protect kahikatea and red beech (tawhai raunui) forests on the river's terraces, including kākāriki parakeets.

== See also ==
- List of rivers of New Zealand
