= Samoyed dog =

Dog breed

Samoyed
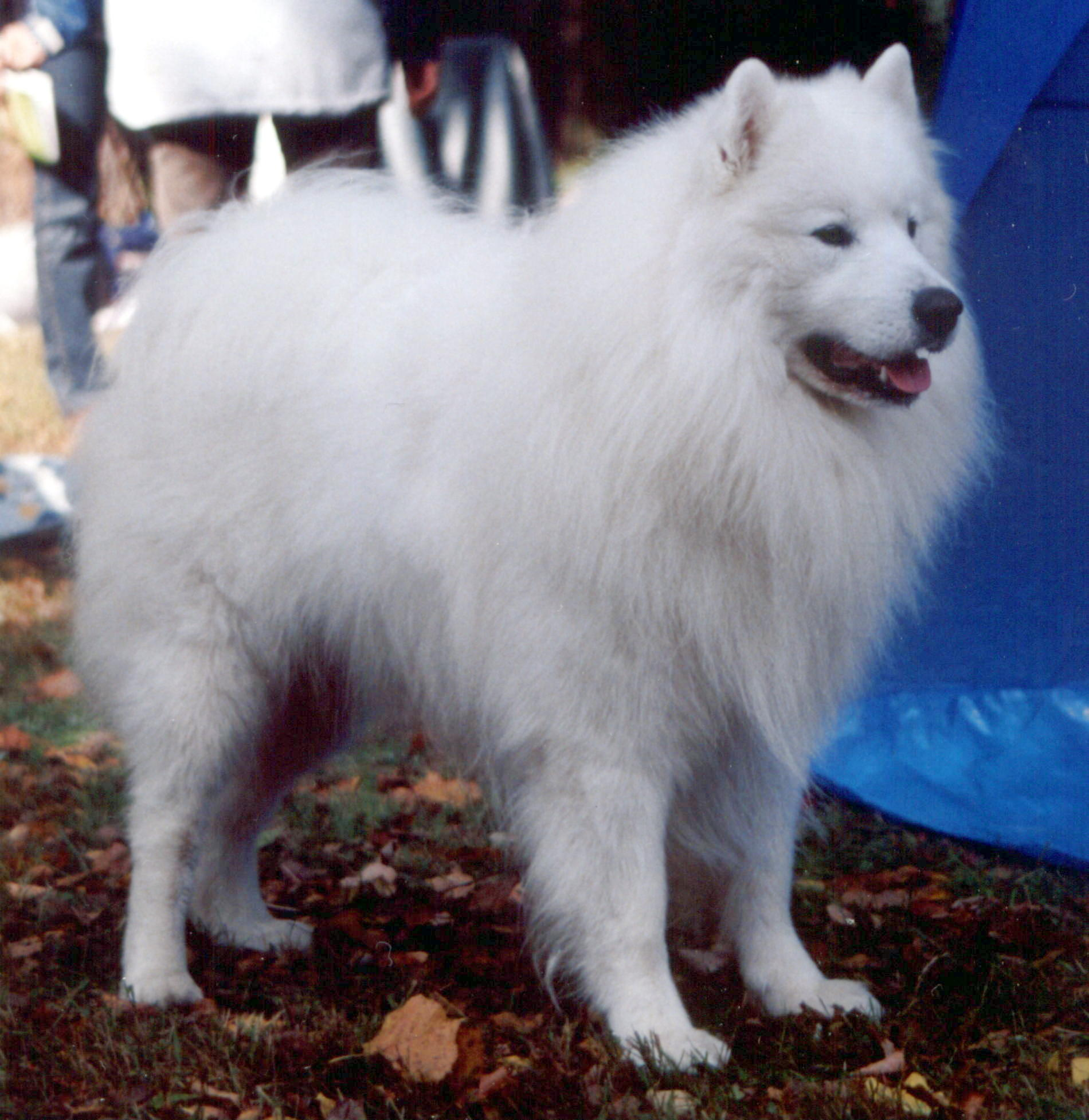
- Other names: Bjelkier; Samoiedskaya Sobaka
- Origin: Russia
Traits
Height	Males	51–56 cm (20–22 in)
	Females	46–51 cm (18–20 in)
Weight	Males	20–30 kilograms (44–66 lb)
	Females	16–20 kilograms (35–44 lb)
- Color: White, Cream, White and Biscuit
Kennel club standards
- Fédération Cynologique Internationale: standard

The Samoyed (/ˈsæməjɛd/ SAM-ə-yed or /səˈmɔɪ.ɛd/ sə-MOY-ed; Russian: самое́дская соба́ка, romanized: samoyédskaya sobáka, or самое́д, samoyéd) is a breed of herding dog with a thick, white, double-layered coat. They are spitz-type dogs which take their name from the Samoyedic peoples. Descending from the Nenets Herding Laika, they are domesticated animals that assist in herding, hunting, protection and sled-pulling.

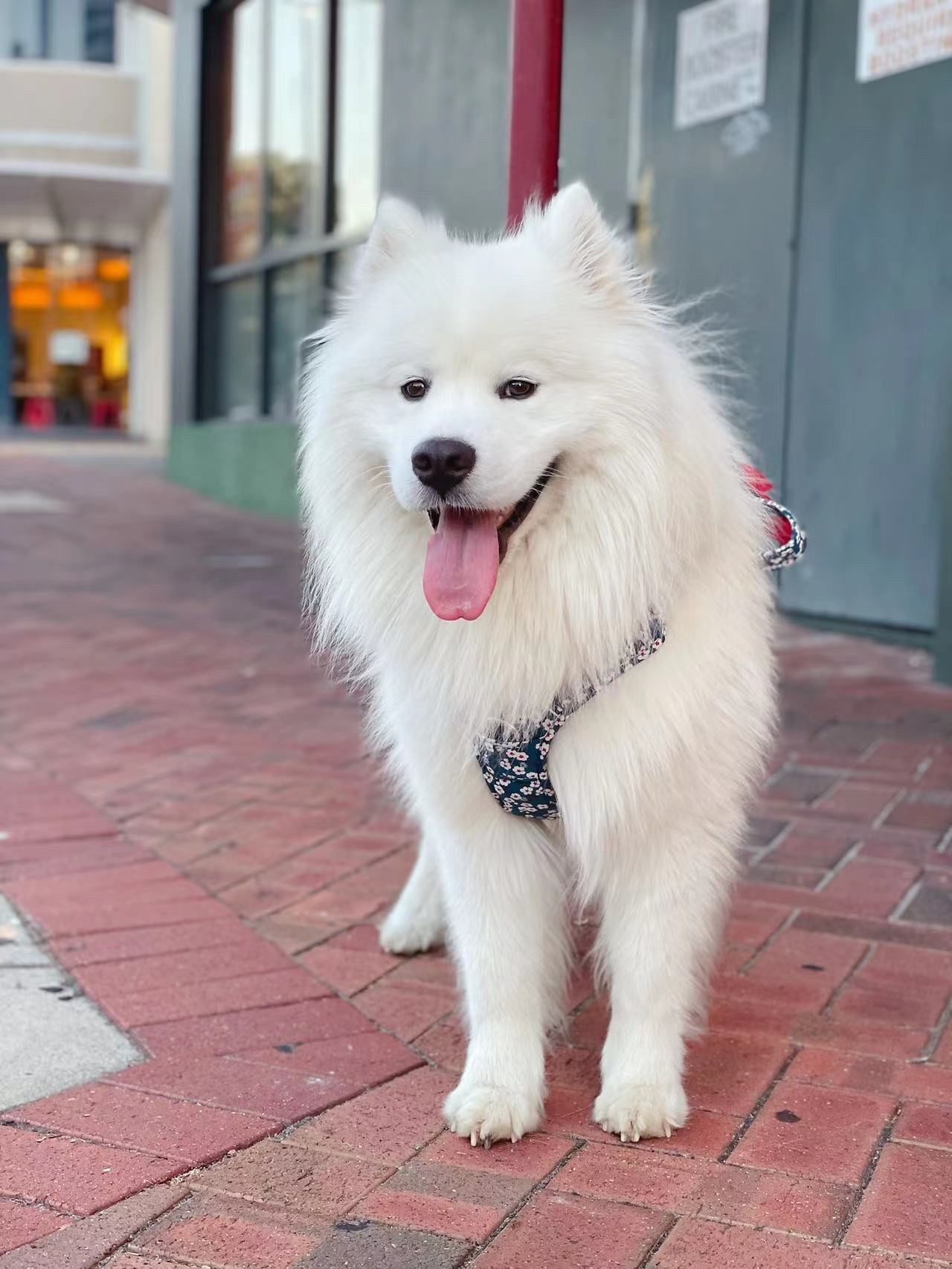
A 2.5-year-old male Samoyed

Samoyed dogs are most often white, and can have a brown tint to their double-layer coat, which is naturally dirt-repellent. They have been used in expeditions in both Arctic and Antarctic regions, and have a friendly and agreeable disposition.

== History ==
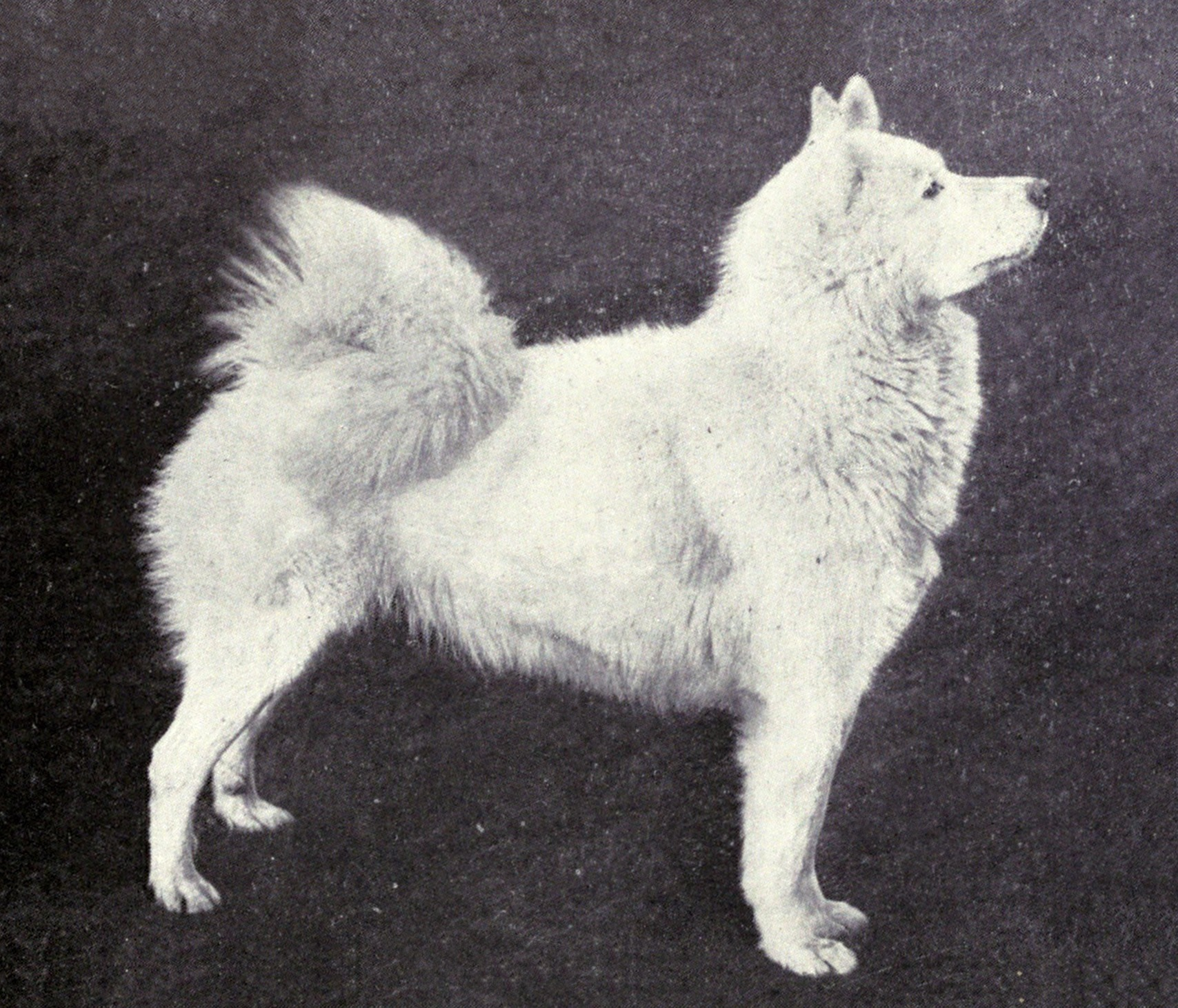
Samoyed, circa 1915

The progenitor of the Samoyeds was the Nenets Herding Laika, a reindeer herding spitz commonly used throughout the Arctic, especially the Nenets people, who were pejoratively referred to as Samoyeds at that time. DNA evidence confirms that Samoyeds are a basal breed that predates the emergence of the modern breeds in the 19th century. A genomic study of two dog specimens nearly 100 years old obtained from the Nenets people on the Yamal Peninsula found that these are related to two specimens dated 2,000 years old and 850 years old, which suggests continuity of the lineage in this region. The two 100-year-old dogs were closely related with the Samoyed breed, which indicates that the ancient Arctic lineage lives on in the modern Samoyed dog.

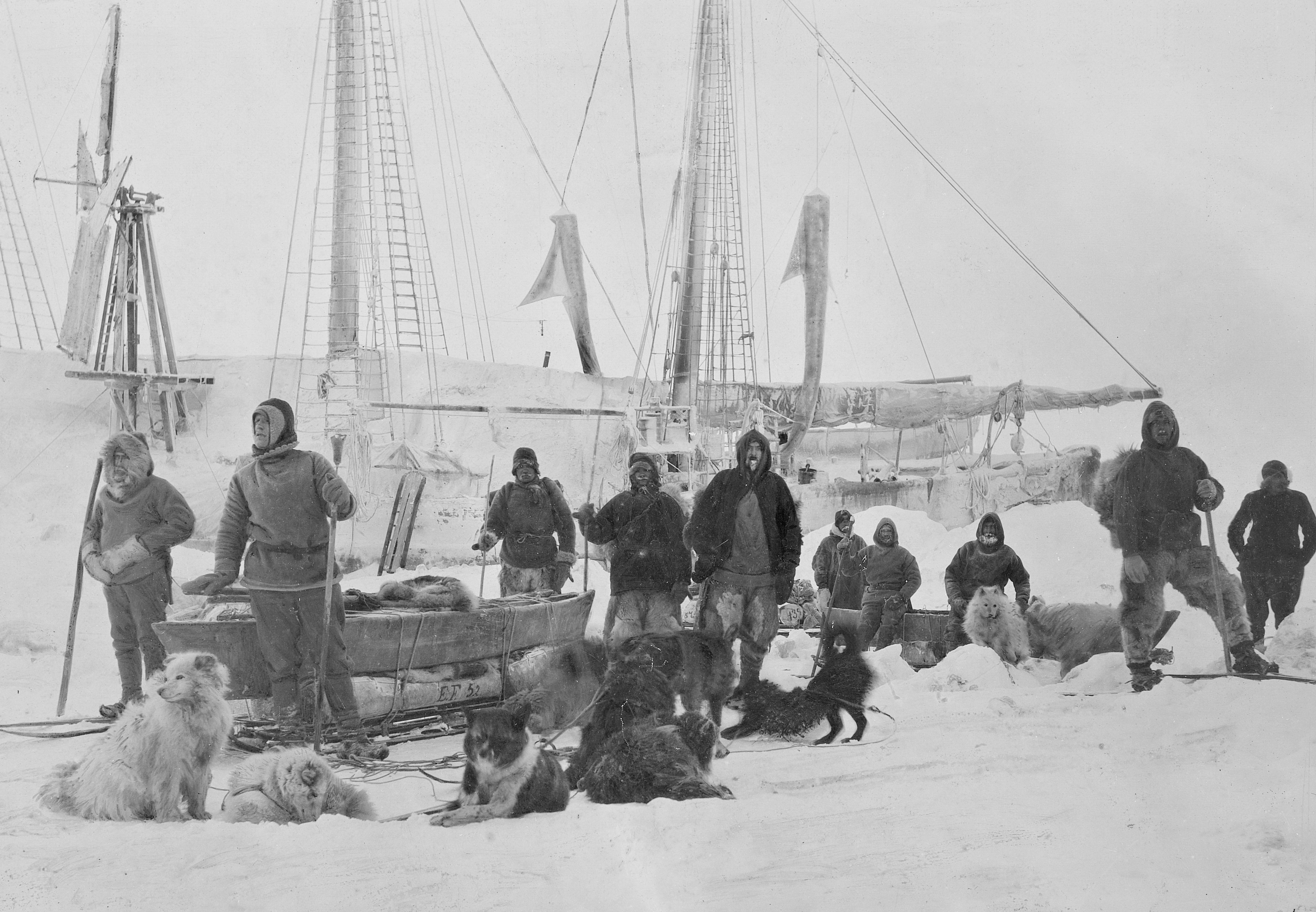
Nansen Johansen departing to the North Pole

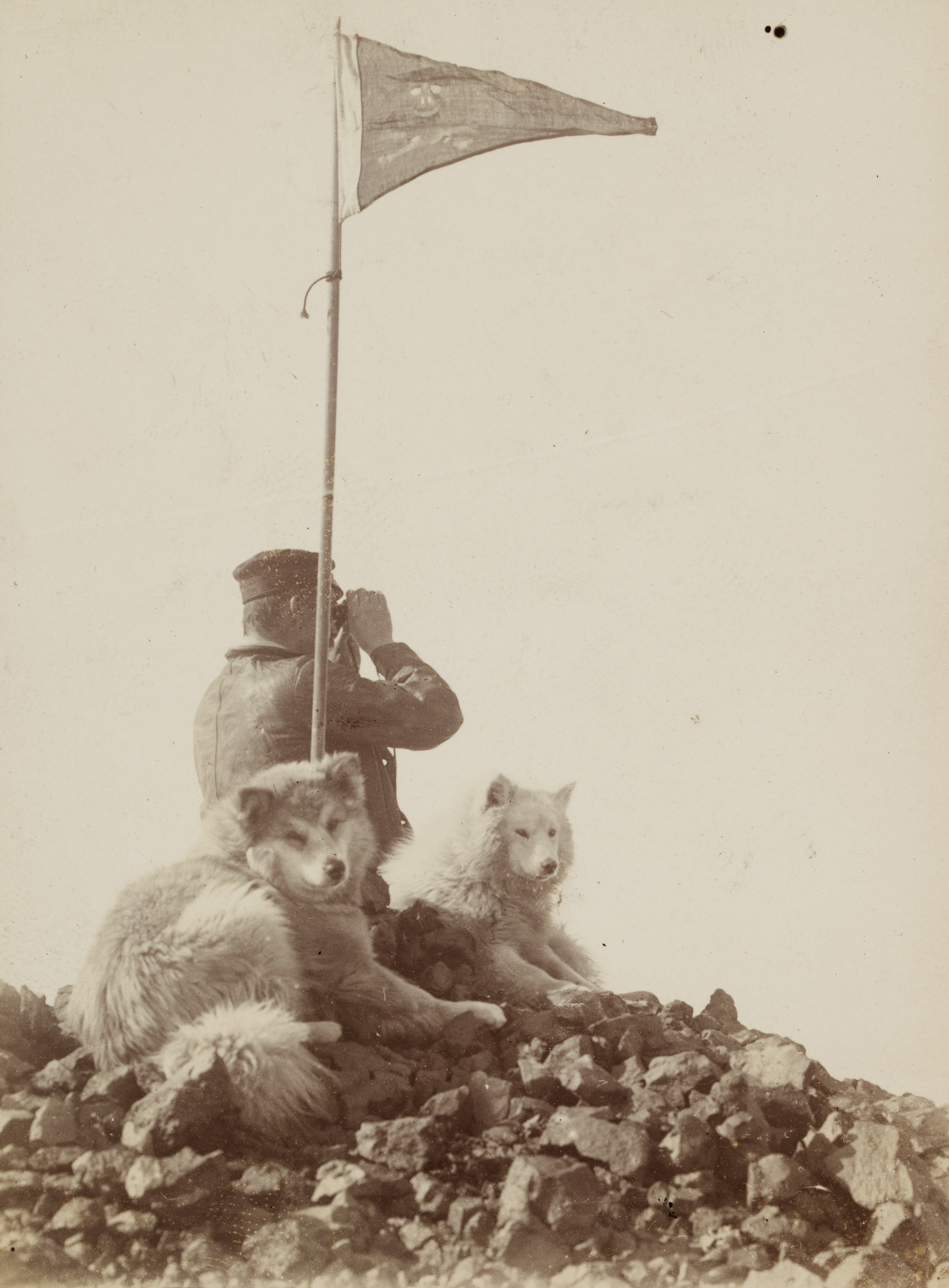
Southern Cross Expedition, 1899

During preparation for the Fram expedition to the North Pole in 1893–1896, 33 dogs were purchased from the Nenets people. Of these dogs, 28 were used in an attempt on the North Pole; none of those survived. The remaining dogs, including pups born during the voyage, were left aboard the ship. In April 1893 the bitch had another litter, most of them white. According to Nansen's notes "all the dogs were strong, tough and excellent at pulling sleds; they worked very well in hunting Polar bears [as well]." These dogs would become the original Samoyeds.

British Zoologist Ernest Kilburn-Scott is widely considered the founder of Samoyed breed. In 1889, he returned to England with a puppy he had purchased from a Samoyed encampment near Arkhangelsk. In the early days, imported dogs were a wide array of colors. However, it was widely believed that the "true Samoyeds", as originally bred in Siberia, were predominantly white. In 1909, the first official breed standard for the Samoyed was developed in England.

In 1898–1900, Carsten Borchgrevink brought 90 Samoyeds to the southern hemisphere during the Southern Cross Expedition. In his book To the South Polar Regions, expedition member Louis Bernacchi wrote:

The sickness was aggravated by the intense heat and the appalling effluvium arising from the 90 Siberian sledge-dogs we had on deck. These dogs were procured from the Samoyedes in the North of Siberia and were the first dogs ever introduced in Antarctic exploration.

On the return trip, the dogs were left on Native Island, New Zealand. Due to quarantine requirements, many of the dogs were killed but a few remained. Nine of the remaining dogs were bought by Ernest Shackleton.

Robert Falcon Scott brought twenty Samoyeds with him during his 1902 journey. The dogs struggled under the conditions Scott placed them in, with four dogs pulling heavily loaded sleds through 45 cm (18 in) of snow with bleeding feet. Scott blamed their failure on rotten dried fish.

== Appearance and characteristics ==
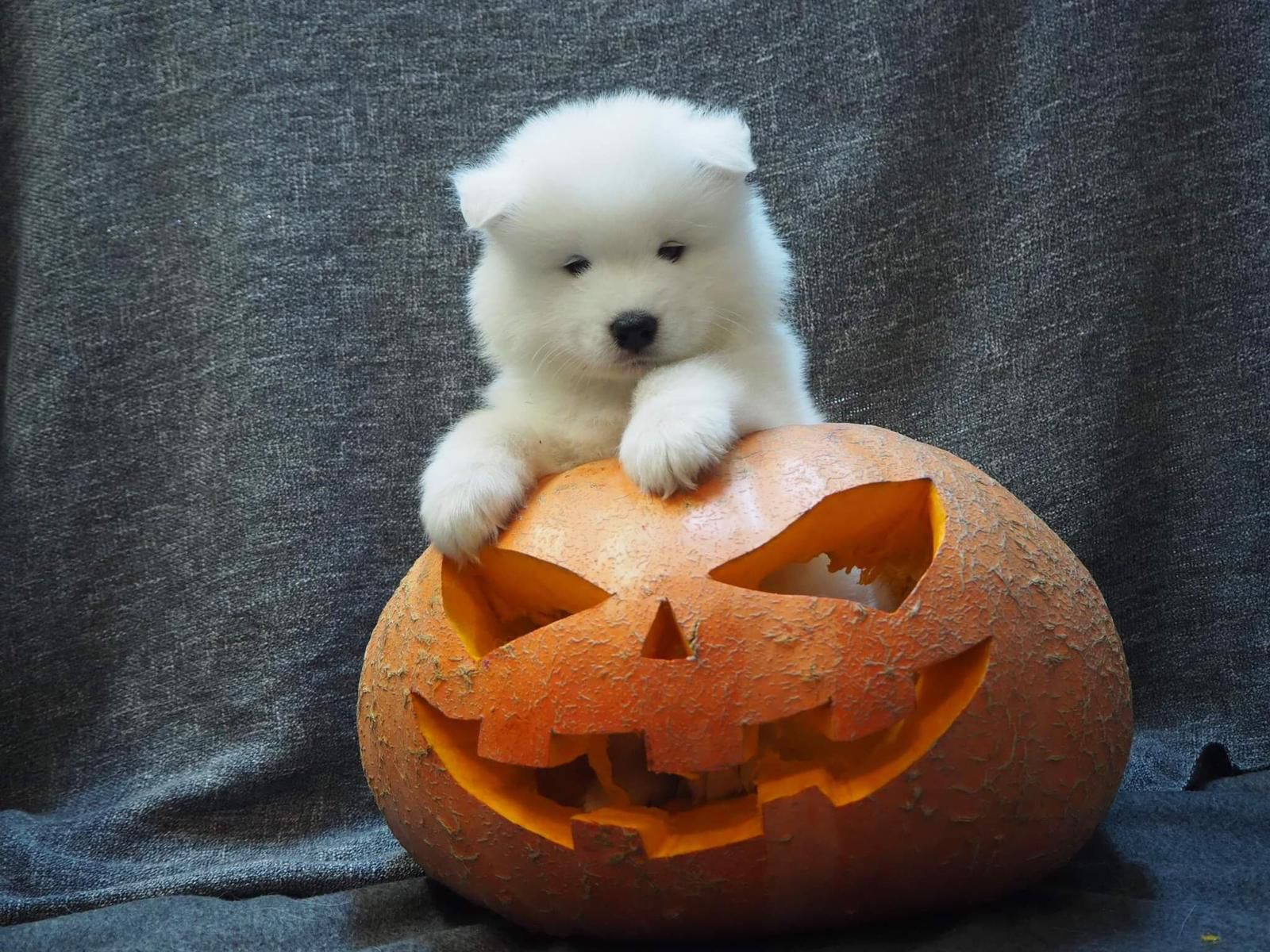
Samoyed puppy

The AKC Standard requires 45–65 pounds (20–29 kg) and 21–23.5 inches (53–60 cm) at the shoulder for males, and 35–50 pounds (16–23 kg) and 19–21 inches (48–53 cm) for females. The UK Kennel Club Standard requires 51–56 centimetres (20–22 in) for males, and 46–51 centimetres (18–20 in) for females.

Samoyed ears are thick and covered with fur, triangular in shape, and erect. They are almost always white but have a light to dark brown tint (known as "biscuit") to a greater or lesser extent. The tint is usually on the ears but can be visible on the whole body.

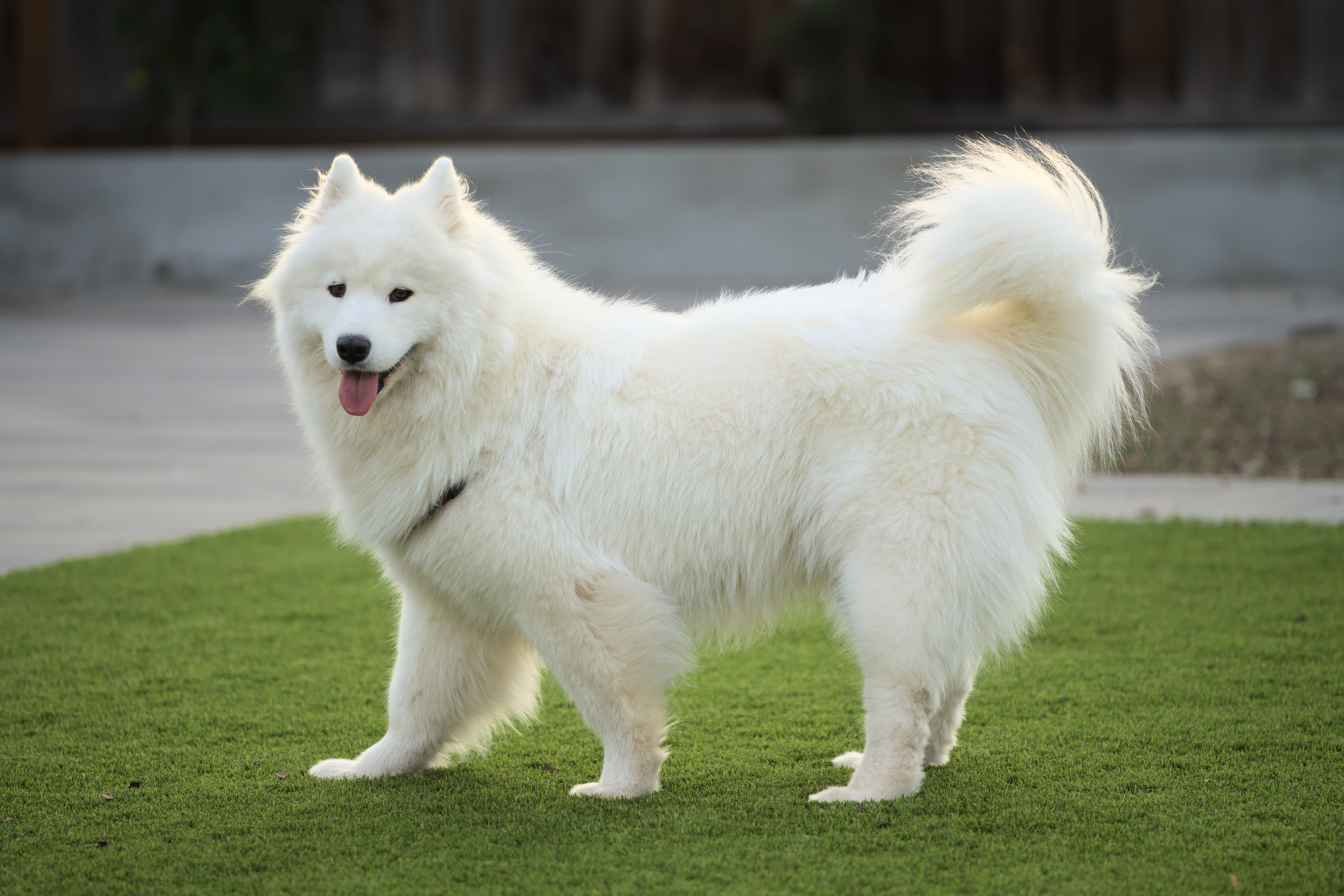
A two-year-old adult female Samoyed. The breed is characterized by an alert and happy expression.

The Samoyed tail is one of the breed's distinguishing features. Like the Alaskan Malamute, the tail is carried curled over the back; however, unlike the Alaskan Malamute, the Samoyed tail is held actually touching the back. It is not usually held in a tight curl, or held flag-like; it is usually carried lying over the back and to one side. In cold weather, Samoyeds may sleep with their tails over their noses to provide additional warmth. Almost all Samoyeds will allow their tails to fall when they are relaxed and at ease, as when being stroked or while eating, but will return their tails to a curl when more alert.

Samoyeds have a dense, double layer coat. The topcoat contains long, coarse, and straight guard hairs, which appear white but have a hint of silver coloring. This top layer keeps the undercoat relatively clean and free of debris. The under layer, or undercoat, consists of a dense, soft, and short fur that keeps the dog warm. The undercoat typically sheds heavily once or twice a year, and this seasonal process is sometimes referred to as "blowing coat". This does not mean the Samoyed will shed only during that time however; fine hairs (versus the dense clumps shed during seasonal shedding) will be shed all year round, and have a tendency to stick to cloth and float in the air. The standard Samoyed may come in a mixture of biscuit and white coloring, although pure white and all biscuit dogs are common. Males typically have larger ruffs than females. While this breed is touted as "hypoallergenic", it does shed a fair amount and needs frequent grooming. While the breed may produce fewer allergens, care should be taken for severe allergies.

Shed Samoyed fur is sometimes used as an alternative to wool in knitting, with a texture similar to angora. The fur is sometimes also used for the creation of artificial flies for fly fishing.

Life expectancy for the breed is about 12–13 years.

== Temperament ==
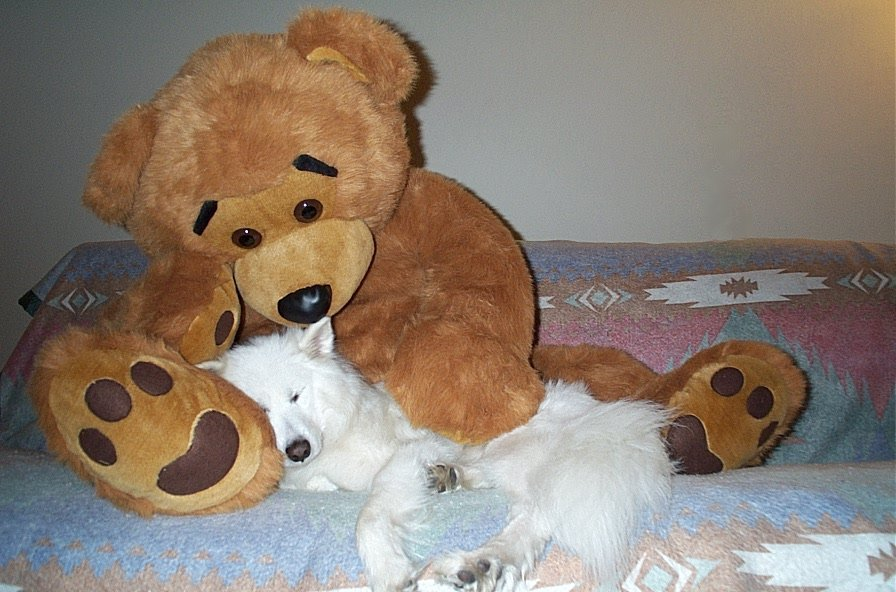
A Samoyed resting with a teddy bear

Samoyeds' friendly and affable disposition makes them poor guard dogs; an aggressive Samoyed is rare. The breed is characterized by an alert and happy expression which has earned the nicknames "Sammie smile" and "smiley dog". With their tendency to bark, however, they can be diligent watch dogs, barking whenever something approaches their territory. Samoyeds are excellent companions, especially for small children or even other dogs, and they remain playful into old age. According to the Samoyed Club of America, when Samoyeds become bored, they may become destructive or start to dig.

== Activities ==
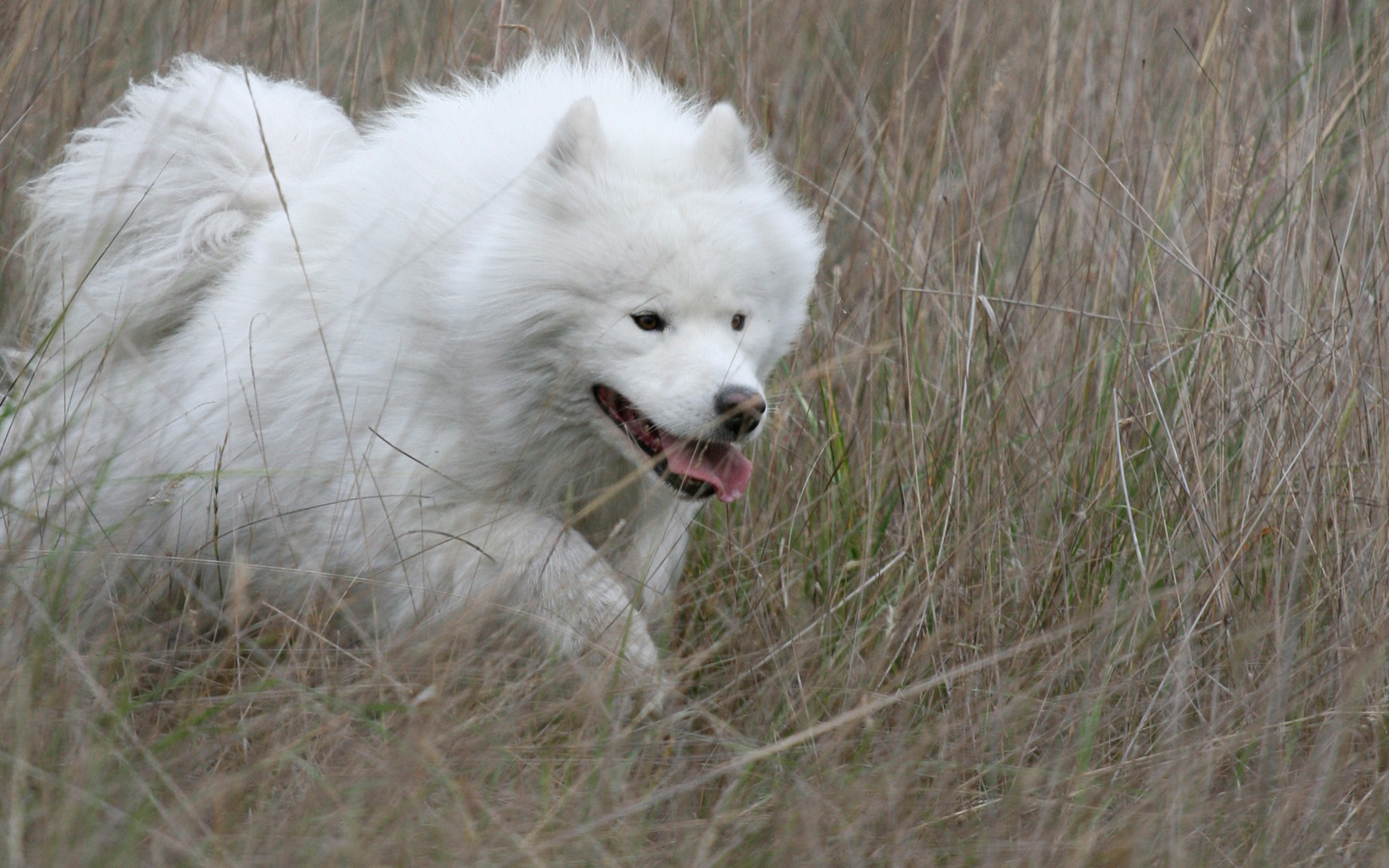
An active Samoyed

Samoyeds can compete in dog agility trials, carting, obedience, showmanship, flyball, tracking, mushing and herding events. Herding instincts and trainability can be measured at non-competitive herding tests. Samoyeds exhibiting basic herding instincts can be trained to compete in herding trials.

== Health ==
A 2024 UK study found a life expectancy of 13.1 years for the breed compared to an average of 12.7 for purebreeds and 12 for crossbreeds.

=== Samoyed hereditary glomerulopathy ===
The breed can be affected by a genetic disease known as Samoyed hereditary glomerulopathy, a kidney disease. The disease is known to be caused by an X-linked recessive faulty allele and therefore the disease is more severe in male Samoyeds. Also known as hereditary nephritis, it is caused by a nonsense mutation in codon 1027 of the COL4A5 gene on the X chromosome (glycine to stop codon), which is similar to Alport's syndrome in humans.

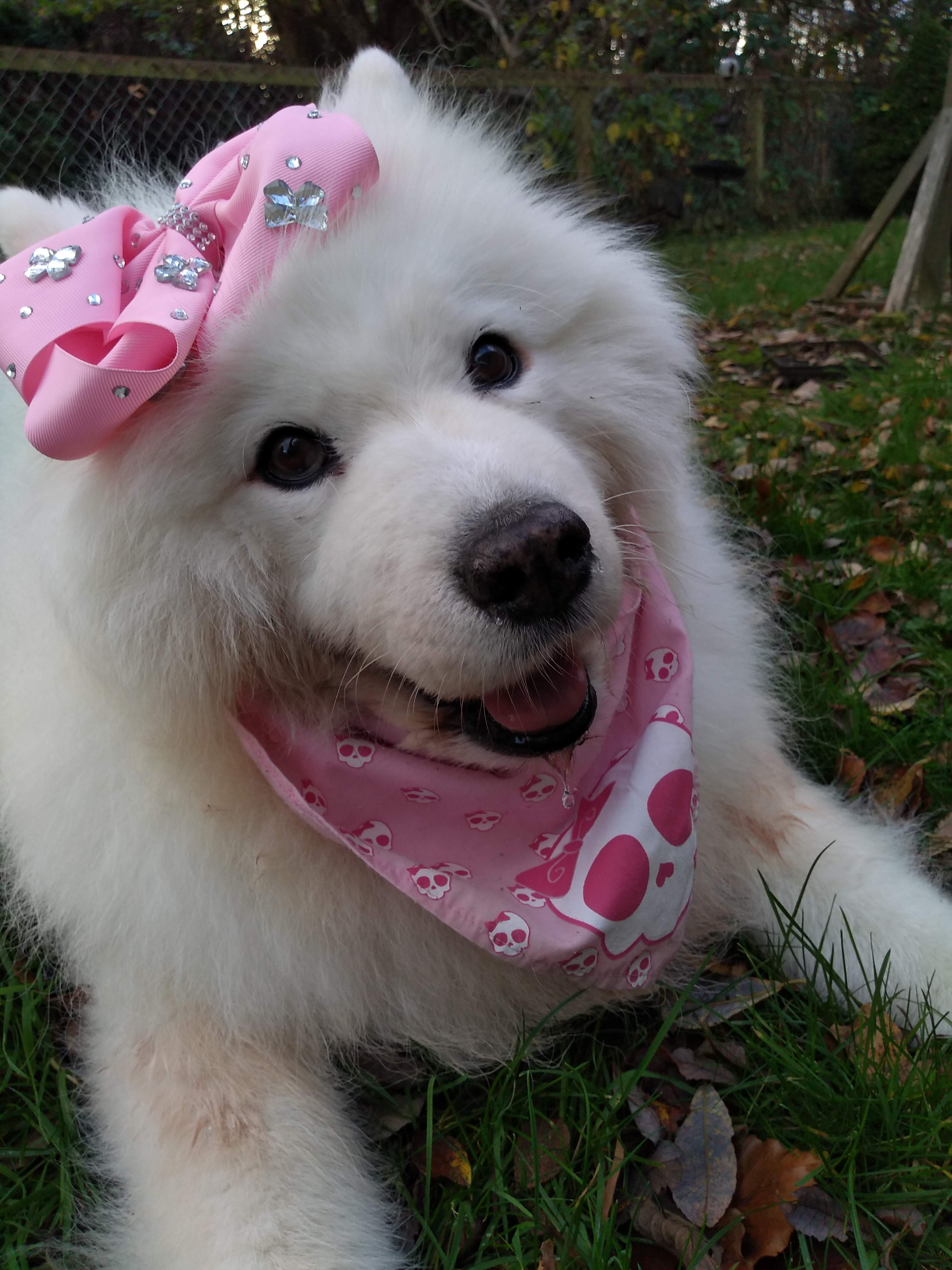
A senior female Samoyed

Carrier females do develop mild symptoms after 2–3 months of age, but mostly do not go on to develop kidney failure. The disease is caused by a defect in the structure of the type-IV collagen fibrils of the glomerular basement membrane. As a consequence, the collagen fibrils of the glomerular basement membrane are unable to form cross-links, so the structural integrity is weakened and the membrane is more susceptible to "wear-and-tear" damage. As the structure of the basement membrane begins to degenerate, plasma proteins are lost in the urine and symptoms begin to appear. Affected males appear healthy for the first three months of life, but then symptoms start to appear and worsen as the disease progresses: the dog becomes lethargic and muscle wastage occurs, as a result of proteinuria. From three months of age onwards, a reduced glomerular filtration rate is detected, indicative of progressive kidney failure.

Clinically, proteinuria is found in both sexes from the age of three to four months; in dogs older than this, kidney failure in combination with more or less pronounced hearing loss occurs swiftly and death at the age of 8 to 15 months is expected. In heterozygous females, the disease develops slowly. The disease can be treated to slow down the development by use of cyclosporine A and ACE inhibitors, but not stopped.

If a carrier female is mated with a healthy stud dog, the female offspring have a 50% chance of being carriers for the disease, and any male offspring have a 50% chance of being affected by the disease. A genetic test is available for this disease.

=== Other health concerns ===
For the Samoyeds several breed-specific hereditary diseases are described in the veterinary literature:

- Diabetes mellitus similar but not identical to human Type I (insulin deficiency): The disease occurs in middle-aged Samoyeds, the mean age at diagnosis is seven years. The cause is a chronic inflammation of the pancreas and/or autoimmune destruction of the beta cells of islets of Langerhans. Moreover, autoantibodies to insulin were found in affected dogs. Several genetic markers are being discussed as possible causes.
- Progressive retinal atrophy (PRA) caused by a frameshift mutation in the RPRG locus of the X chromosome. The disease leads to a slowly progressive loss of vision, which eventually leads to blindness. The first symptoms appear between two and five years of age. The disease corresponds to the X-linked PRA type 3 in humans.
- Short legs in conjunction with eye abnormalities: a genetic defect at the COL2A1 locus leads to disproportionate dwarfism due to short limbs in connection with cataracts, malformations of the retina or retinal detachment, liquefaction of the vitreous and a persistent hyaloid artery. The malformations of the retina are dominant (i.e. they occur in heterozygous dogs); the other symptoms are recessive, so that they are expressed only in homozygous dogs. These conditions have no effect on the expression of the protein opticin.
- Pulmonary stenosis occurs more frequently in Samoyeds in comparison with other breeds. The disease can cause shortness of breath, cardiac arrhythmias and rapid fatigue when moving, and increases the risk of congestive heart failure.
- Hip dysplasia is also a concern for Samoyeds.
- The breed can also be affected by sebaceous adenitis, an uncommon idiopathic autoimmune skin disease.

== See also ==
- Samoyeds
- List of dog breeds
