= Watercourse area =

Type of New Zealand protected area

A watercourse areas is a type of New Zealand protected area owned by the New Zealand Government and administered by the Department of Conservation.

Under the Conservation Act 1987, the Minister of Conservation may declare an area of conservation, reserve or heritage land next to a river, lake, or stream a watercourse area, if the land and waters combined have "outstanding wild, scenic, or other natural or recreational characteristics".

Under the Act, watercourse areas should be managed to protect those characteristics, and its management should be coordinated with the management of other watercourse areas.

Other watercourses on private land may also be protected from alteration. These include any natural, modified or artificial, open water channels, be they continual or intermittent, including river beds, stream beds, gullies, low-lying areas, ditches and drainage channels. These also include culverts or pies that are installed to replace those channels. Not all of these watercourses are recorded.
