= Native Island =

Island off the east coast of North Stewart Island, New Zealand

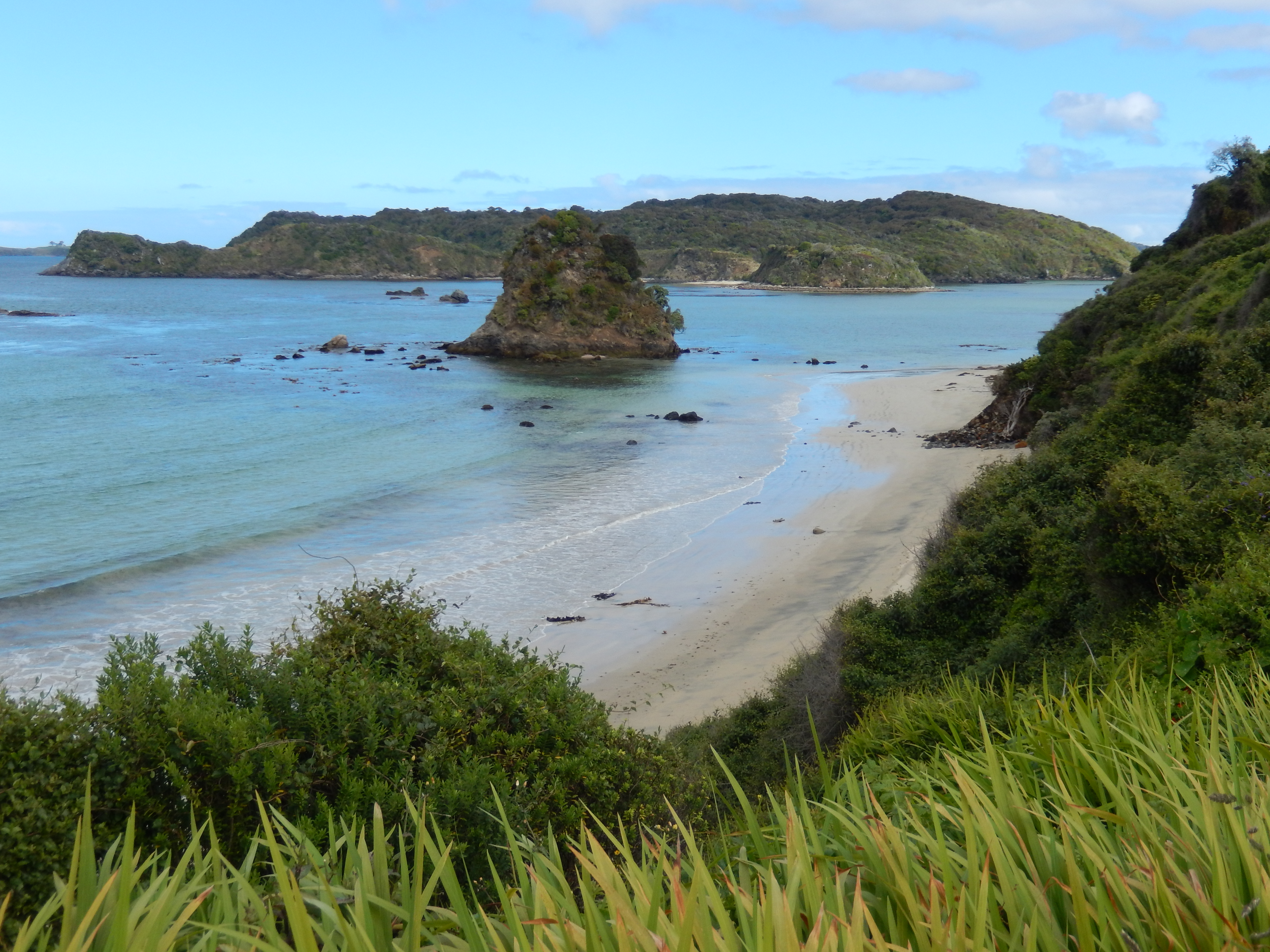
- Ringaringa Beach and Native Island off the coast of Stewart Island, New Zealand
- Interactive map of Native Island

Geography
- Location: Paterson Inlet, Stewart Island
- Coordinates: 46°54′55″S 168°09′10″E
- Area: 29,575.19 km^{2} (11,419.04 sq mi)
- Length: 1.0 km (0.62 mi)
- Width: 0.7 km (0.43 mi)

Administration
- New Zealand
- Region: Southland

Demographics
- Population: uninhabited

Native Island is off the east coast of Halfmoon Bay, Stewart Island, New Zealand. It is north east of Ulva Island in the northern mouth of Paterson Inlet. It is separated from Stewart Island by a narrow channel 50 metres (160 ft) in width. There has been evidence of small and temporary past Māori settlements on the island. Multiple Māori relics have been found, including bone fish hooks, axes, and chisels. Native Island is part of the Ulva Island-Te Wharawhara Marine Reserve, which is on the south part of Native Island.

== History ==
In the early 19th century, there were Māori battles fought on Native Island. The island was deserted in the 1840s after visiting ships brought measles, triggering a deadly epidemic. Survivors held a korero and agreed to set fire to their homes before leaving the island.

In the Antarctic Southern Cross Expedition in 1898–1900, 92 huskies, Samoyeds and Greenland Esquimaux dogs were held in Native Island (with government reluctance) for temporary quarantine and examination. Due to quarantine regulations, most of the dogs were killed, but a few were kept under permission from MP Joseph Ward on the premise that they could be used for a future expedition. Nine descendants of these dogs were used in Ernest Shackleton's 1907–1909 Nimrod Expedition.

In 1927 a large piece of ambergris was found on the island. The following year, the whaler C. A. Larsen, a Norwegian factory ship, was towed and beached near Native Island after it went aground at Whero Rock. The ship's tanks leaked 2,000 tons of whale oil into the sea, causing long-term damage to the shell beds off Ringaringa Beach on Stewart Island.

In 1944 it was reported that there were rabbits in Native Island after being released in Stewart Island a year prior. The rabbits were described like a pest—eating exposed roots of trees; there were also goats, but it has been reported that neither now inhabit the island. In 2013 the Department of Conservation started a rat-trap test on Native Island, planting around 140 self-setting Goodnature A24 traps which were checked every 4 to 5 weeks in order to control the island's ship and Norway rat populations. A year later, sniffer dogs could not detect any rats on the island.

In 2021 it was considered to put a wind farm on Native Island, but this was ultimately scrapped due to the difficulty of making the transmission route, anticipated lack of wind, that half of the island is a national park, and cultural value that is associated with Native Island.

== Flora and fauna ==
Fossils of South Island giant moa have been found on Native Island. Rhytida australis snails are common, and Native Island also has Tuatara.

According to nature writer Sheila Natusch, sand-fixing plant life on the island includes coprosma, muehlenbeckia, golden sand sedge (pikao), and pink-flowered convolvulus.
