= Lake Sumner =

Lake in New Zealand

Hoka Kura (Lake Sumner)
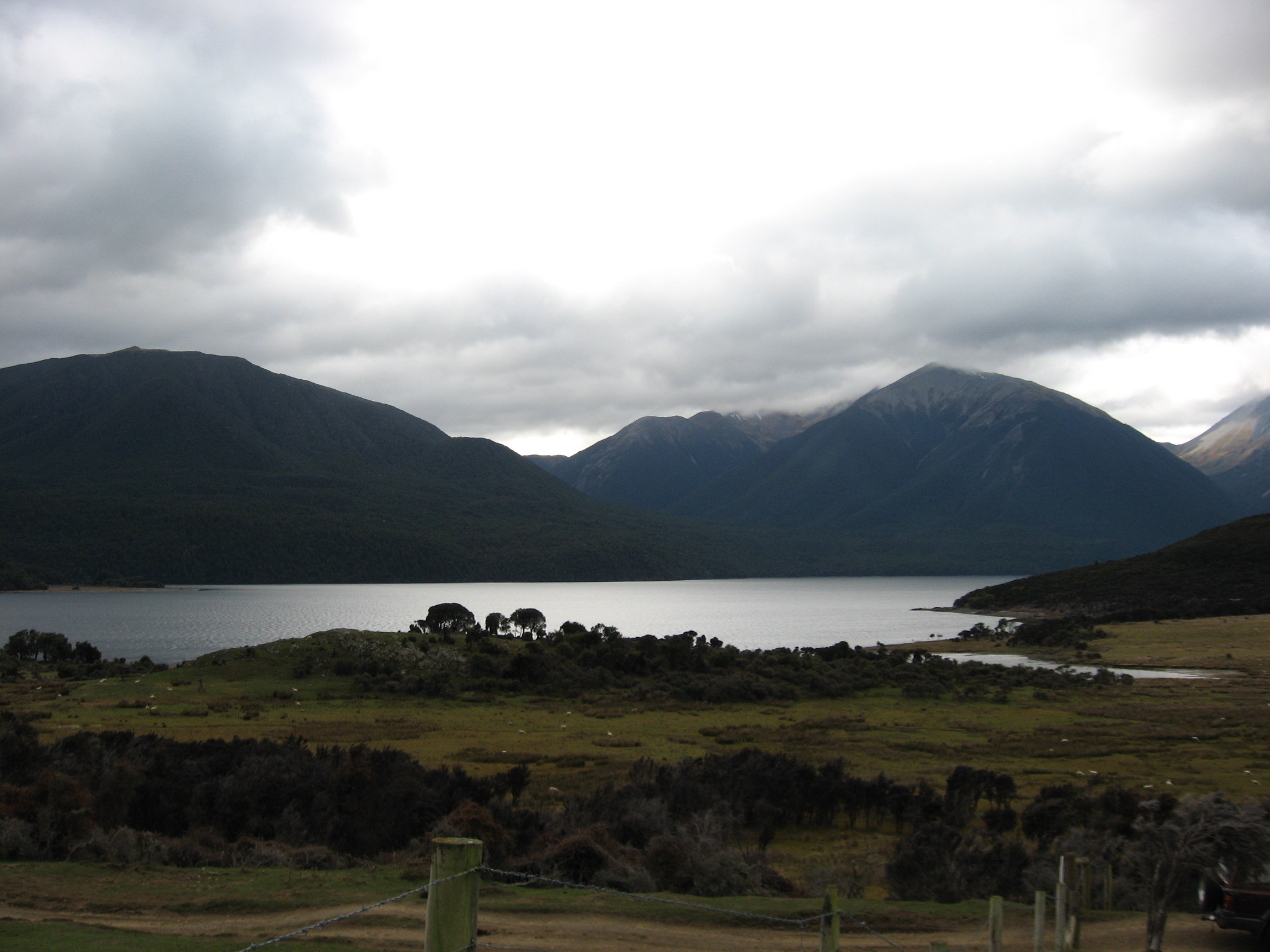
- Hoka Kura (Lake Sumner), viewed from above Shoal Bay

- Location within South Island
- Interactive map of Hoka Kura (Lake Sumner)
- Location: Lake Sumner Forest Park, Hurunui District in the Canterbury region, South Island
- Coordinates: 42.70°S 172.217°E
- Basin countries: New Zealand
- Surface area: 13.73 km^{2} (5.30 sq mi)
- Max. depth: 135 m (443 ft)
- Surface elevation: 505 m (1,657 ft)

Lake Sumner, known as Hoka Kura in Māori, is a highland lake situated 100 km (62 mi) northwest of Christchurch in the North Canterbury Region of New Zealand's South Island. Covering an area of 1,373 ha (3,390 acres) and a maximum depth of 135 m (443 ft), the lake is located in the Lake Sumner Forest Park and on the main stem of the Hurunui River. Several other lakes such as Loch Katrine, Lake Sheppard, Lake Taylor and Lake Mason also lie within the park.

The Lake Sumner region is a popular area for hunting, tramping, trout fishing, whitewater kayaking and mountain biking. Several Department of Conservation tramping huts in the region make it a common destination for overnight trips; however, the area's comparatively remote location and difficult vehicle access mean it is seldom crowded.

Hoka Kura is a cold inland oligotrophic lake formed approximately 18,000 years ago. It fills a trough 9.7 km (6.0 mi) long by 2.4 km (1.5 mi) wide, within the glacially-carved Hurunui River Valley. The North Branch of the upper Hurunui River enters the lake via a shingle delta at the northwestern end and drains through a narrow natural channel at the southeastern end of the lake.
