= Conservation Act 1987 =

Act of Parliament in New Zealand

New Zealand Parliament
- Long title: An Act to promote the conservation of New Zealand's natural and historic resources, and for that purpose to establish a Department of Conservation
- Royal assent: 31 March 1987
- Commenced: 1 April 1987
- Introduced by: Labour Party

Related legislation
- National Parks Act 1980; Reserves Act 1977
- Status: Current legislation

The Conservation Act 1987 is New Zealand's principal act concerning the conservation of indigenous biodiversity. The Act established the Department of Conservation (who administer the Act) and Fish and Game, and complements the National Parks Act 1980 and the Reserves Act 1977.

The Conservation Act and the management strategies (CMS) and plans (CMPs) that are created under it have the overriding principle of "protection". This is contrasted with the overriding principle of New Zealand's most important planning statute, the Resource Management Act 1991 (RMA), which is "sustainable management" (s5, Resource Management Act 1991). Whilst there is often overlap between the RMA and the Conservation Act, the principle of protection has primacy over that of sustainable management.

The Conservation Act also sets up a hierarchy of consideration of activities occurring on public conservation land under s6(e):

"to the extent that the use of any natural or historic resource for recreation or tourism is not inconsistent with its conservation, to foster the use of natural and historic resources for recreation, and to allow their use for tourism"

This hierarchy places the greatest weight on intrinsic value, followed by non-commercial recreation, and then by tourism. An important role in conservation advocacy in New Zealand is ensuring that these three separate considerations are maintained, rather than blurred.

National Parks retain a separate Act of Parliament, which sets up a similar, but more stringent planning regime.

The Conservation Act also sets out a number of Specially protected areas:

- Conservation parks
- Wilderness areas
- Ecological areas
- Sanctuary areas
- Watercourse areas
- Amenity areas
- Wildlife management areas

== See also ==
- Minister of Conservation
- Conservation in New Zealand
