= Doubtful River (New Zealand) =

Coordinates: 42°33′S 172°21′E

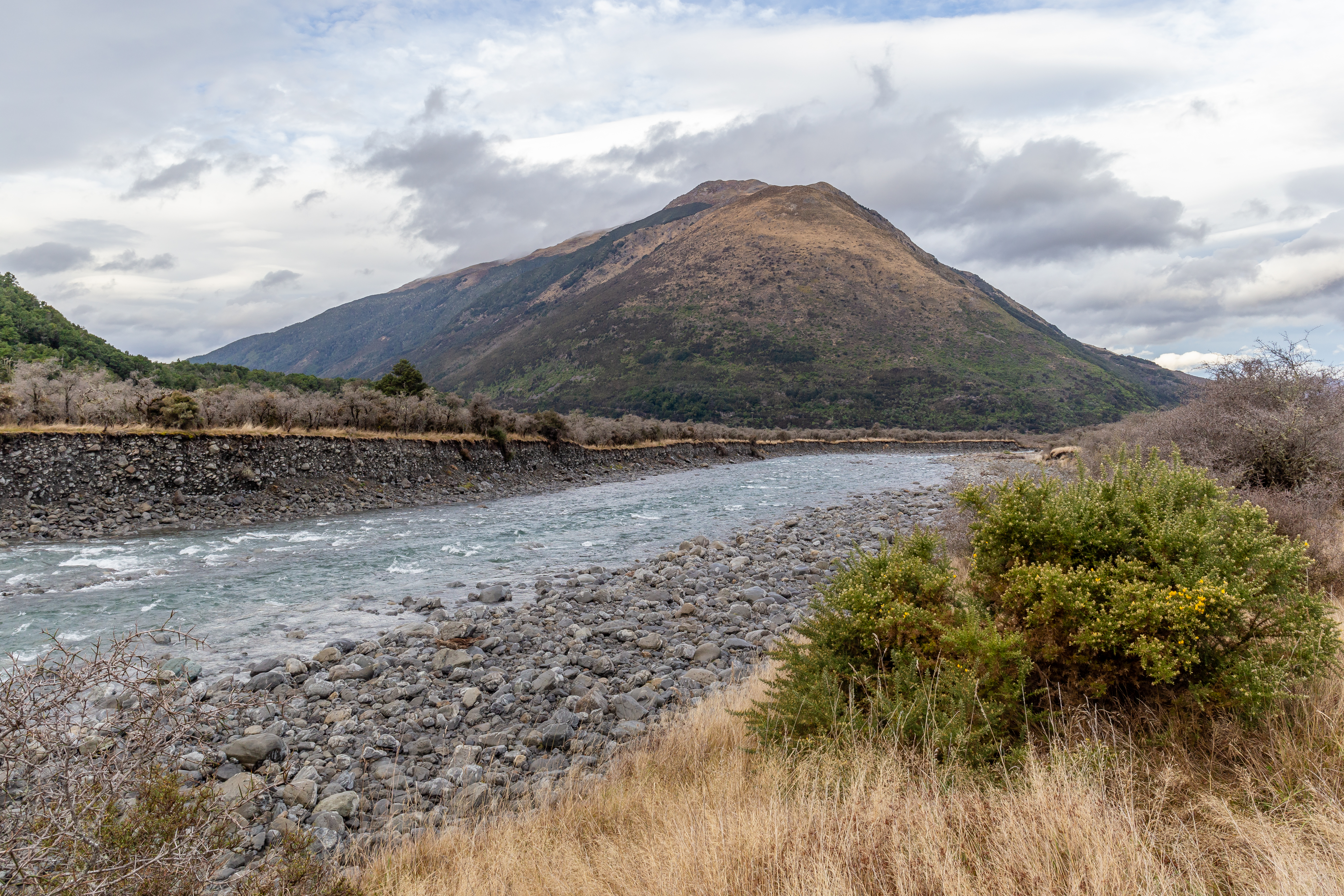

Location
- Country: New Zealand

Physical characteristics
- Source
  - location: Southern Alps
  - elevation: 1,166 m (3,825 ft)
- Mouth
  - location: Boyle River
  - elevation: 531 m (1,742 ft)
- Length: 13 km (8.1 mi)

The Doubtful River is a river in the Canterbury region of New Zealand. It rises near Mount Barron and flows south then south-east through Lake Sumner Forest Park, reaching the Boyle River 40 kilometres (25 mi) west of Hanmer Springs. The Doubtful Range lies to the south. The Doubtless River and Devilskin Stream are tributaries entering from the north.

The New Zealand Department of Conservation maintains a tramping track alongside the river, with routes off to the north and south. Backcountry huts are available for trampers near the junctions with the Devilskin Stream and Doubtless River.

== See also ==
- List of rivers of New Zealand
