= Haupiri River =

River of New Zealand

Coordinates: 42°34′50″S 171°42′45″E

Location
- Country: New Zealand

Physical characteristics
- Source
  - location: Southern Alps
- Mouth
  - location: Ahaura River

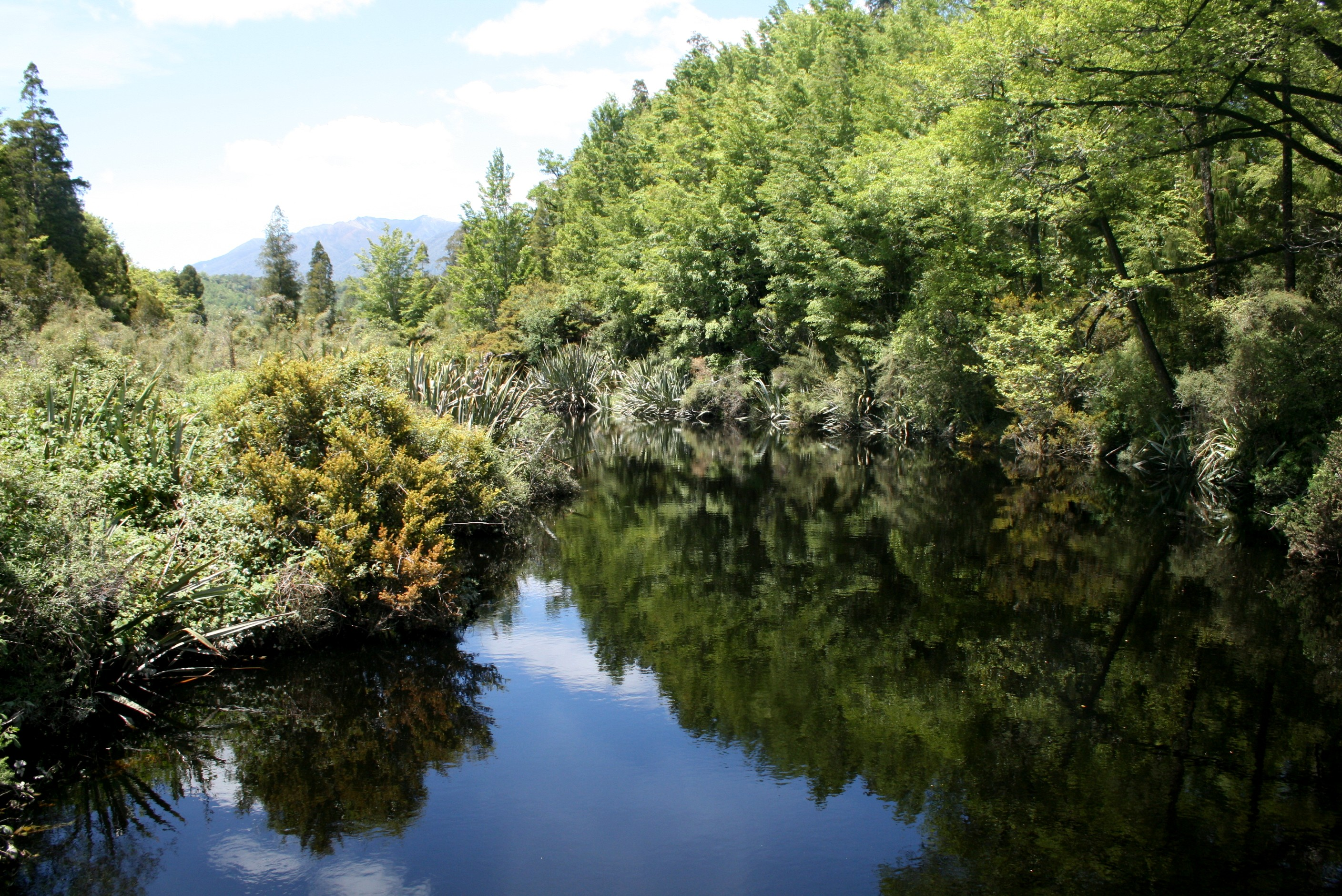
Upper Haupiri River

The Haupiri River is a river of New Zealand. It starts near Mount Dixon in the Kaimata Range of the Southern Alps and flows north-west near to Lake Haupiri, then north-east to join the Ahaura River. The Ahaura joins the Grey River which flows into the Tasman Sea at Greymouth.

Hot water springs on the upper reaches of the river, near Mount Elizabeth, were developed in the early 20th century by the Tourism Department. Although the structures have been damaged, swimming is still possible. The springs are reached by a tramping track. The springs are now on private land.

Trout fishing is popular in the upper reaches.

== See also ==
- List of rivers of New Zealand
