= Lake Sumner Forest Park =

Forest park in New Zealand

- Location within New Zealand
- Location: South Island, New Zealand
- Nearest city: Christchurch
- Coordinates: 42.618°S 172.252°E
- Area: 105,131.9 hectares (259,787 acres)
- Governing body: Department of Conservation

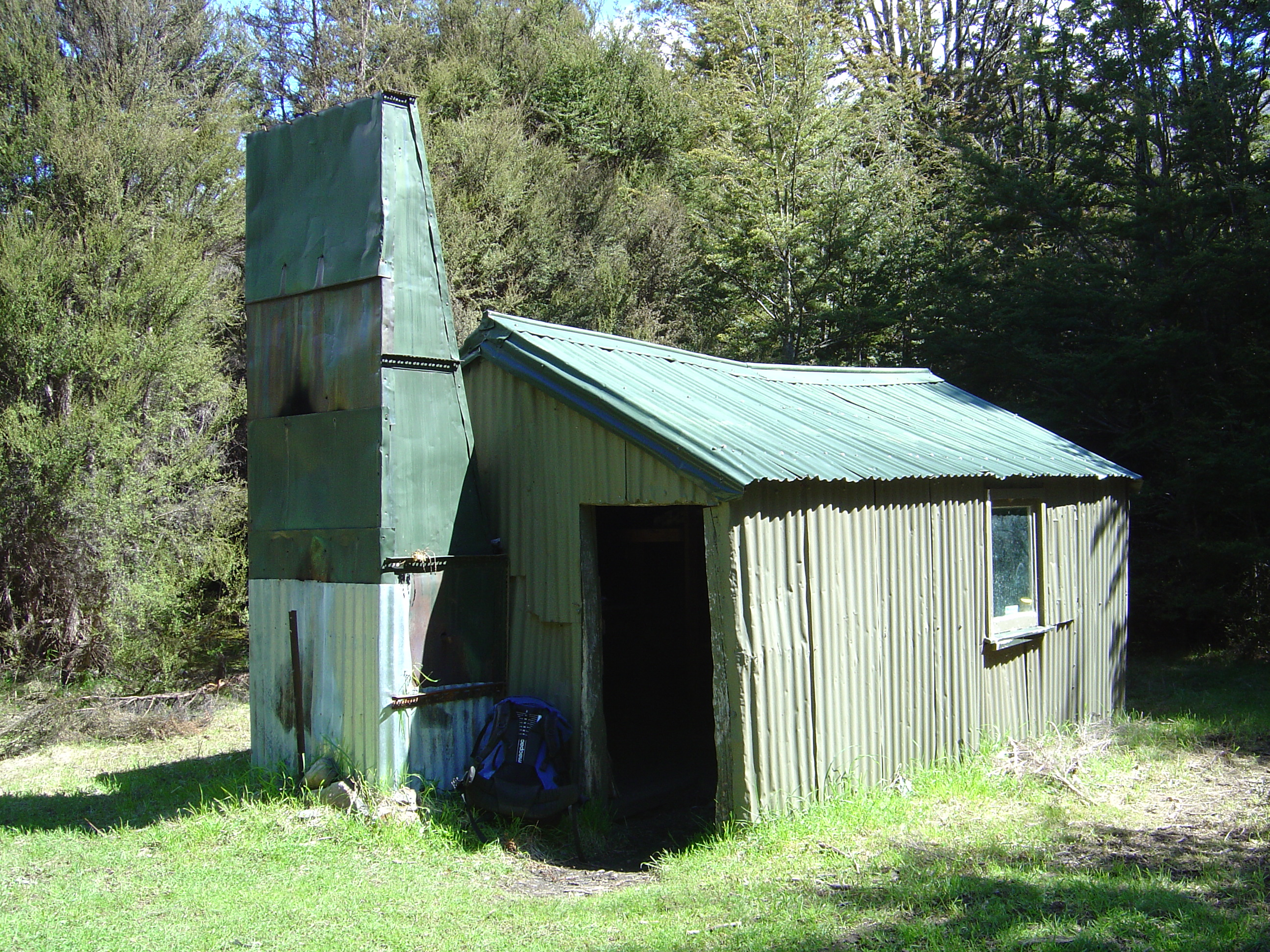
Gabriel hut at lake Sumner Forest Park

Lake Sumner Forest Park is a 1,051 km^{2} (406 sq mi) forest park located in the Canterbury region of the South Island of New Zealand. It is centered around Lewis Pass and has a number of access points along State Highway 7. It sits in between Lewis Pass Scenic Reserve and Arthurs Pass National Park.

The name is derived from Lake Sumner, although Lake Sumner itself is not located in the Forest Park.

== Hot Springs ==
There are numerous hot springs to be found in Lake Sumner Forest Park. One of the easiest to find is above the Hurunui river between The Hurunui Hut and No. 3 Hut.

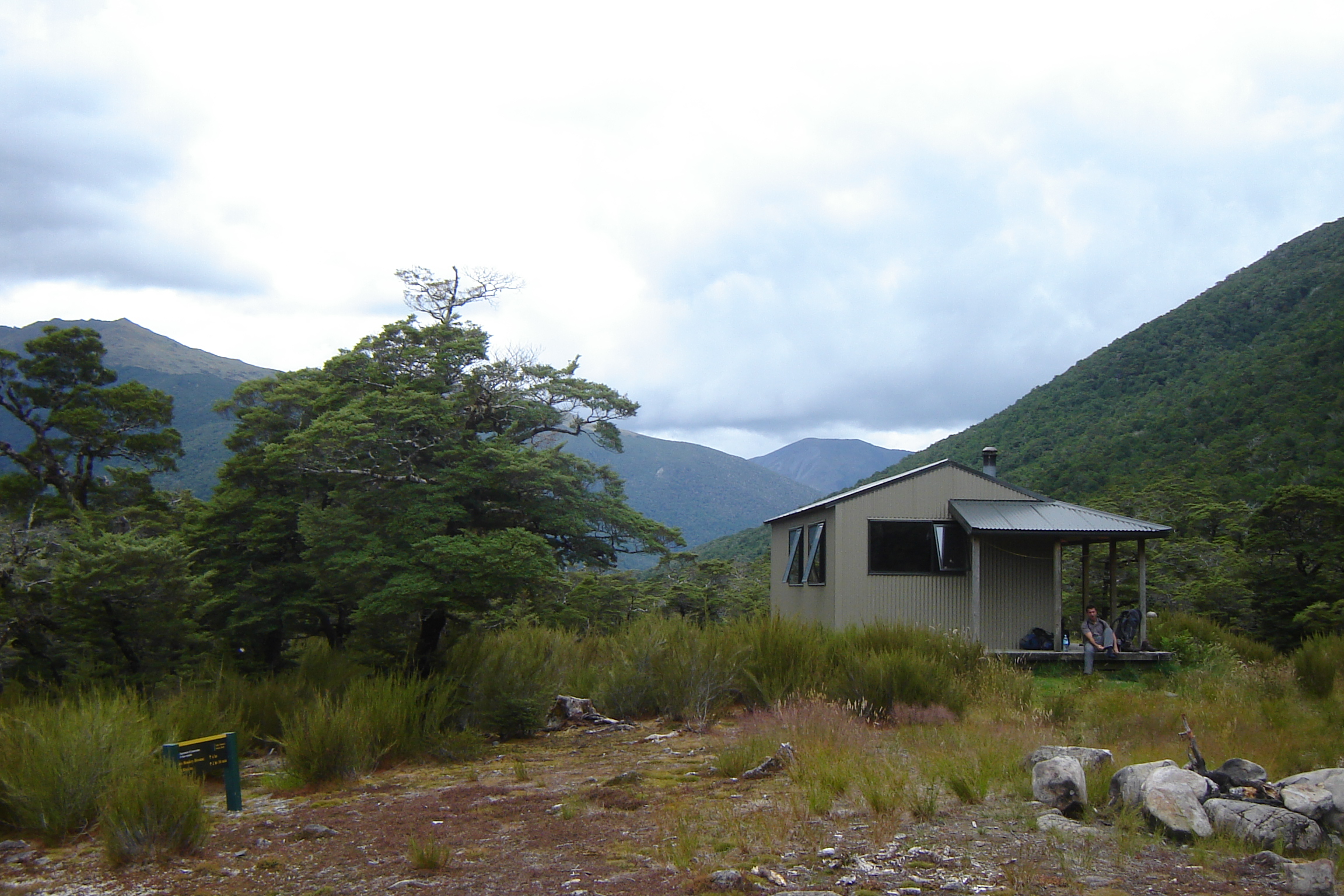
Nina Hut, Lake Sumner Forest Park

== See also ==
- Forest Parks of New Zealand
- Protected areas of New Zealand
