= Queens Park, Invercargill =

Park and sports venue in New Zealand

Coordinates: 46.4016°S 168.3560°E

Queens Park
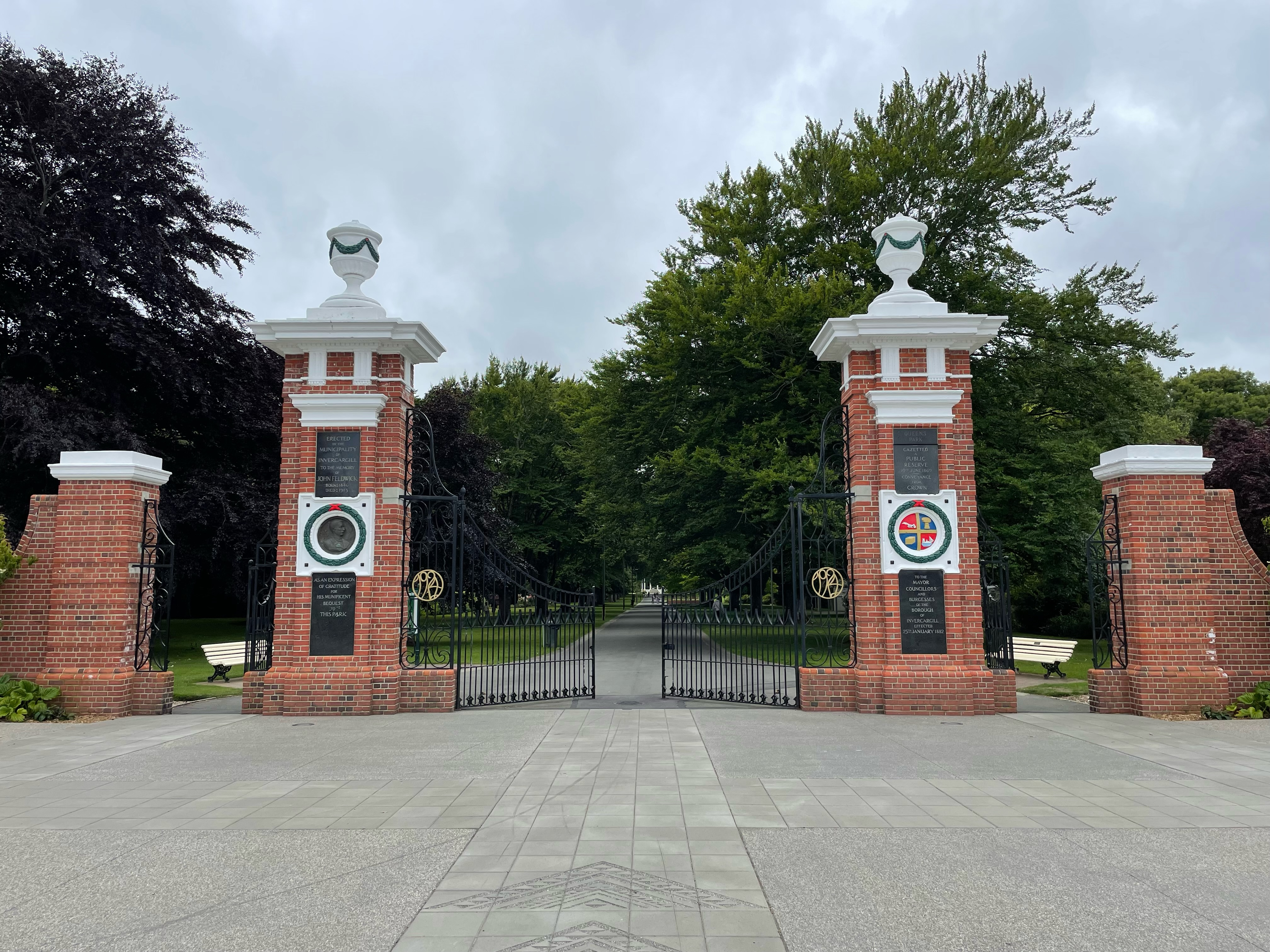
- Feldwick Gates, the main entrance to Queens Park
- Interactive map of Queens Park
- Address: New Zealand
- Location: Invercargill, New Zealand

Ground information
- Establishment: 1975 (first recorded match)

International information
- First women's ODI: 6 March 2010: New Zealand v Australia
- Last women's ODI: 7 March 2010: New Zealand v Australia
- First women's T20I: 18 February 2011: New Zealand v Australia
- Last women's T20I: 5 March 2014: New Zealand v West Indies
- As of 30 September 2020; Source: CricketArchive

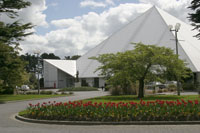
Southland Museum and Art Gallery on the southern edge of Queens Park

Queens Park is a park in Invercargill, New Zealand, and was part of the original plan when Invercargill was founded in 1856. The park is 200 acres (0.81 km^{2}) in extent. It is just north of the city centre, bounded by Queens Drive to the east, Kelvin Street to the west, Gala Street to the south and Herbert Street to the north. The Gala Street entrance features the Feldwick Gates, built in 1924 and named after John Feldwick, brother of MP Henry Feldwick.

The park is home to the Southland Museum and Art Gallery, which is currently being demolished and rebuilt, the Southland Astronomical Society Observatory, and an animal reserve, which features animals such as wallabies, alpacas, ostriches, rabbits and guinea pigs, as well as an aviary. In 2024, tuataras formerly housed in the Southland Museum, including the oldest known living tuatara, Henry, were moved to a new habitat in the animal reserve called Te Moutere - Tuatara Island.

The park is also home to an 18-hole golf course, a botanical garden, and sports grounds. The cricket ground in the park is the home ground of the Southland cricket team, and is also regularly used by the Otago cricket team for first-class and one-day matches. However, in September 2021, the cricket ground was stripped of its first-class status due to drainage issues. The park also gives its name to one of Invercargill's association football clubs, Queens Park A.F.C.

On the northern edge of the park are Waihopai School (formerly Waihopai Primary School) and Southland Boys' High School. Despite being within the boundaries of the park, neither is considered a part of it.

== Notable events ==
The park co-hosted (along with Southland Boys' High School) the 2006 State Twenty20 Cricket Knock-Out Tournament, on 10–12 November 2006. The final round of the tournament was set to be played at Queens Park but due to bad weather only 4 of the scheduled 9 matches took place.

The weekly Saturday Invercargill parkrun takes place at Queens Park. Organized by volunteers, the 5 km run welcomes runners of all fitness levels. In July 2020, the Invercargill parkrun became one of the first in the world to resume after COVID-19 halted the weekly event in early 2020.
