= C8H12O2 =

The molecular formula C_{8}H_{12}O_{2} (molar mass: 140.18 g/mol) may refer to:

- Dimedone
- 2,2,4,4-Tetramethylcyclobutanedione
- Tuataric acid
- Vinylcyclohexene dioxide (VCD)
