= Henry (tuatara) =

Individual tuatara

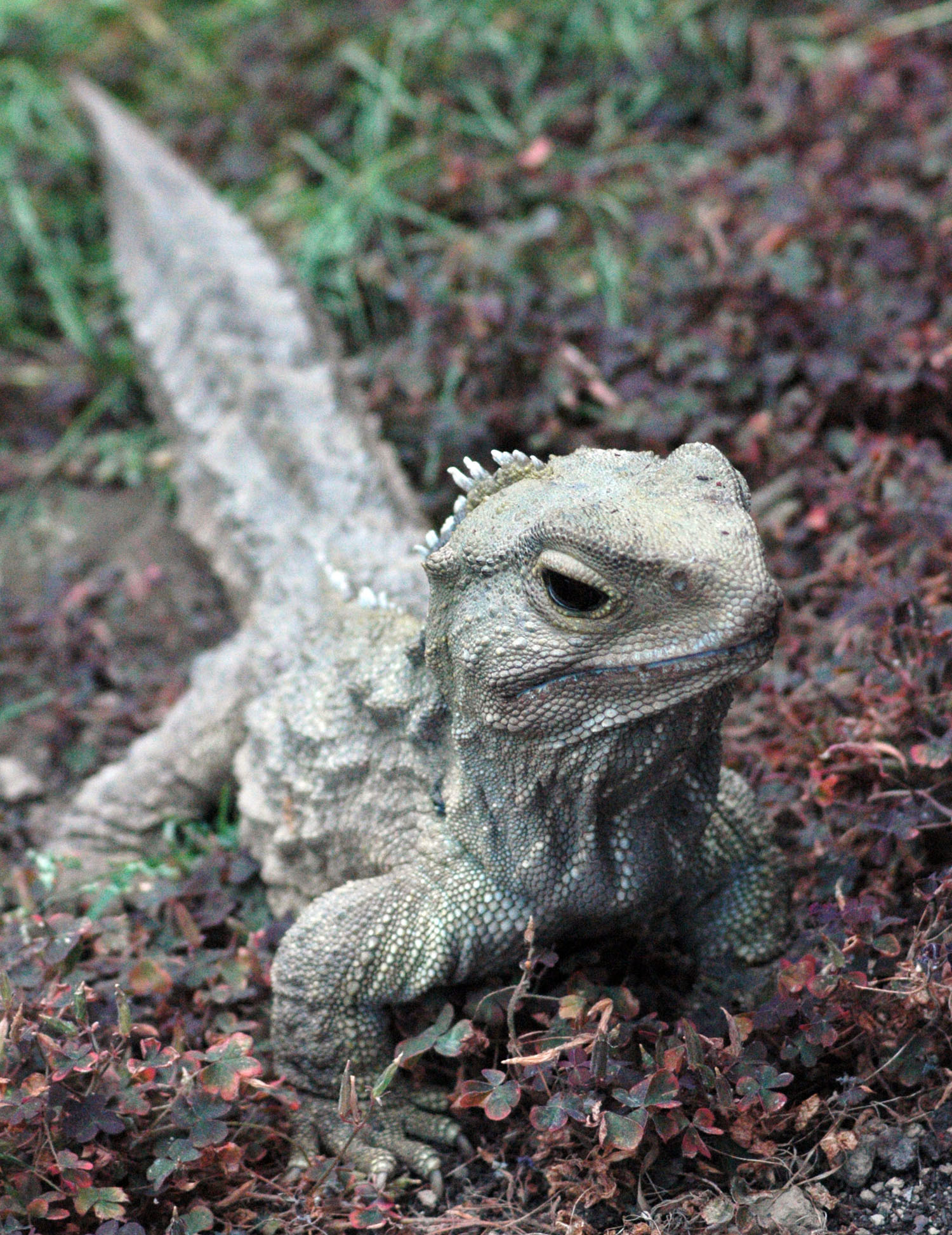
- Henry in Invercargill
- Species: Sphenodon punctatus (Tuatara)
- Sex: Male
- Hatched: c. 1890s – c. 1910s (115–135 years old)
- Nationality: New Zealand
- Known for: Oldest known living tuatara Having an offspring at an old age
- Residence: Animal Reserve at Queens Park
- Offspring: 11
- Named after: Henry VIII

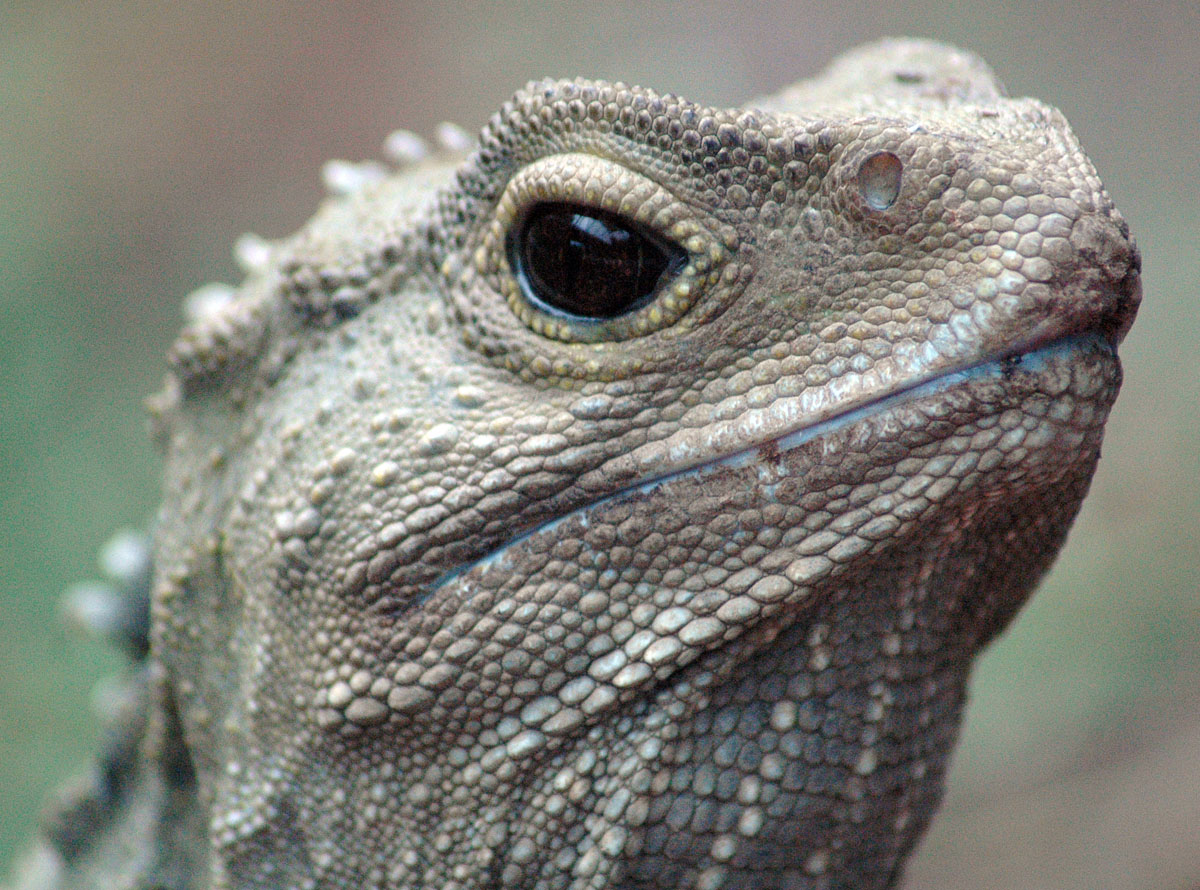
Close up of Henry's head

Henry (born c. 1890s/1910s) is a tuatara who resides in Queens Park, in Invercargill, New Zealand. He was hatched on Stephens Island, which is north of the South Island, and was moved to the Southland Museum and Art Gallery in 1970. He had a cancerous tumour removed from him in 2008 and became a father for the first time in 2009, which received world-wide media attention. In 2024, amidst the demolition and rebuilding of the Southland Museum, Henry was moved to a new habitat with other tuataras within Queens Park.

== Biography ==
Henry was hatched some time between the 1890s and the 1910s on Stephens Island, off the north coast of the South Island, and is believed to be the oldest tuatara alive today. Henry arrived at the Southland Museum and Art Gallery in 1970. He was named after Henry VIII and, according to tuatara keeper Lindsay Hazley, "The plan was for Henry to have lots of wives." The staff tried to get him to breed with a female named Mildred in the 1980s but he bit her tail off. He fought with other tuatara, including a male named Albert. Because he was aggressive, he was kept alone. A cancerous tumour was removed from Henry's genital region in 2008, which caused Henry's libido to come back.

In 2009, Henry became a father for the first time, at the age of about 111. This surprised experts, who believed that it was too late for Henry to have offspring. The female, named Mildred, who Henry had previously spurned in the 1980s, was believed to be in her seventies. She laid 12 eggs, of which 11 hatched after about 223 days. This gathered worldwide media attention. In 2013, staff became concerned that Henry had become infertile. It was not known if it was because of his age, his lifestyle, or the cancer which had been removed about five years prior.

In 2009, the film Love in Cold Blood was made, which featured the romance of Henry and Mildred. It won the Best New Zealand Film and Best New Zealand Emerging Talent awards at the 2010 Reel Earth Environmental Film Festival. In 2015, Prince Harry, who was christened as Henry, met the tuatara at Invercargill Airport as part of a tour of the country.

In 2019, the Southland Museum and Art Gallery announced that they would move most of their tuatara to the Marlborough Sounds, but keep Henry, Mildred and a few other tuatara. In June 2024, Henry and 16 other tuatara were moved to a new habitat in Queens Park while the Southlands Museum is being demolished and rebuilt, after being kept out of public for a year. The opening ceremony saw over 2,000 attendees, and was advertised as Henry's housewarming. It was reported in 2024 that Henry "holds the world record for living in captivity at more than 46 years."
