= Proatlas =

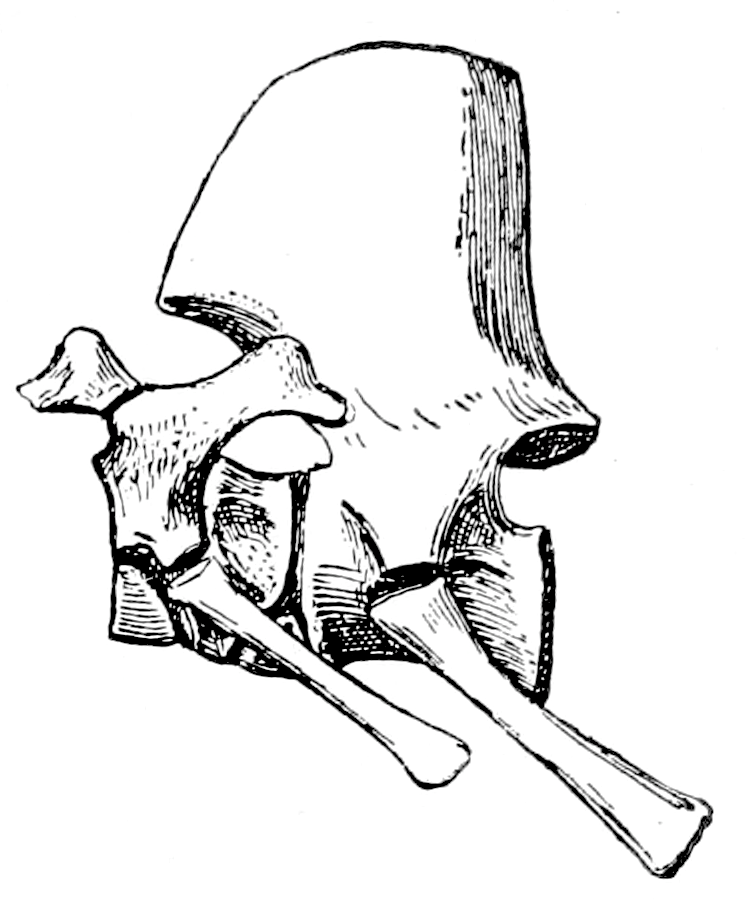
Illustration of first two neck vertebrae (atlas to the left and axis to the right) of the extinct synapsid Ophiacodon, with the proatlas as the small triangular bone attached to the upper left edge of the atlas

The proatlas is a paired bone in the skeleton of some living and many extinct terrestrial vertebrates (tetrapods) that occurs between the skull and the atlas, the first cervical vertebra. It ossifies endochondrally.

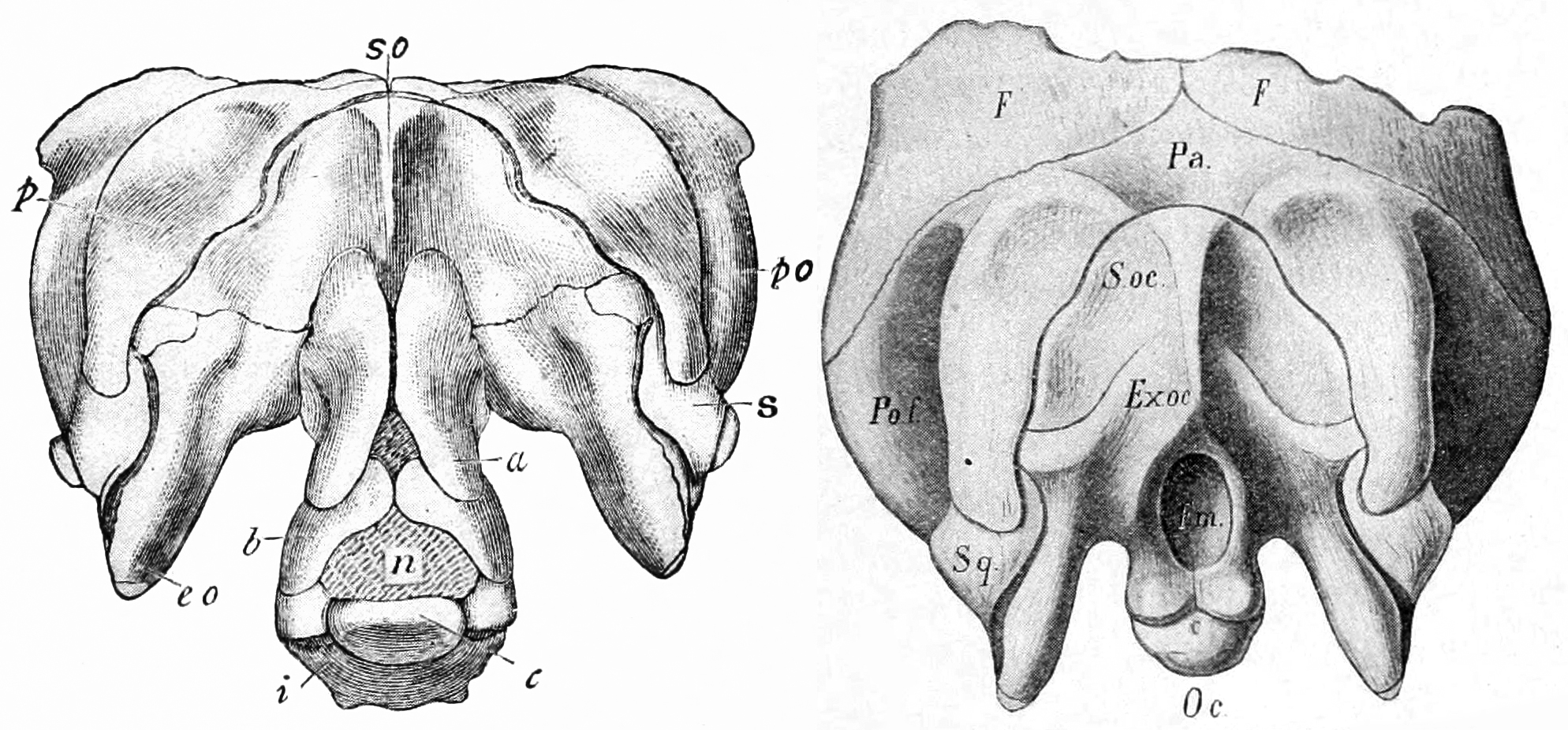
Skull of the sauropod dinosaur Smitanosaurus in posterior view, with (left) and without (right) the proatlases in place

A number of different interpretations have been made of the proatlas. The most common interpretation is that it is the vestigial neural arch of a vertebra that is otherwise fully incorporated into their skull, but the development shows some differences from other vertebrae that present difficulties for this hypothesis. The proatlas of dinosaurs was first recognized by Othniel Marsh, who initially termed them the "post-occipital bones", but their homology with the proatlas of other reptiles was subsequently recognized by Charles W. Gilmore.

The proatlas was not present in early finned tetrapodomorphs, but are present in the limbed stem-tetrapod Greererpeton. Proatlases were probably widely present in early tetrapods, with records in aïstopods, temnospondyls, embolomeres and seymouriamorphs. They were widely present among non-mammalian synapsids, but were lost in the mammaliaform ancestors of mammals. They were also widely present among extinct reptiles, including dinosaurs. The proatlas is absent as a separate element in birds, perhaps as a consequence of fusion with the braincase, with Archaeopteryx the closest relative of modern birds known to retain a separate proatlas. They have also been lost in modern amphibians (Lissamphibia), turtles and squamates (lizards and snakes), but are present in the stem-squamate Huehuecuetzpalli. They are present in the tuatara, though they have not yet been identified in extinct rhynchocephalians. They are also present in living crocodilians, in which the left and right proatlases fuse into a single V-shaped midline element. The proatlas plays a role in the circulation of cerebrospinal fluid in crocodylians.

A proatlas can occur pathologically in humans.
