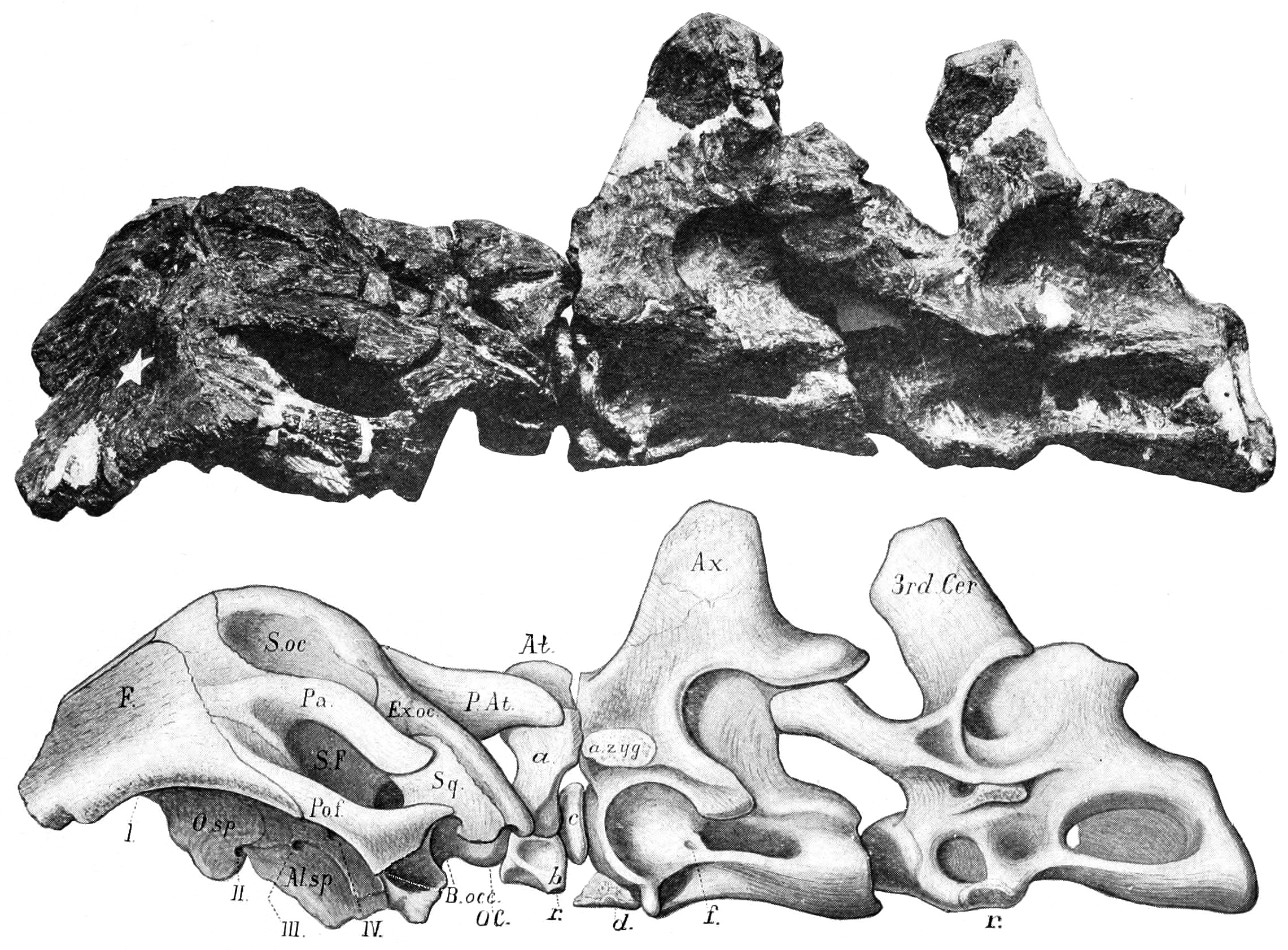
- Back of the skull and neck vertebrae

Scientific classification
- Kingdom: Animalia
- Phylum: Chordata
- Class: Reptilia
- Clade: Dinosauria
- Clade: Saurischia
- Clade: †Sauropodomorpha
- Clade: †Sauropoda
- Superfamily: †Diplodocoidea
- Family: †Dicraeosauridae
- Genus: †Smitanosaurus; Whitlock & Wilson, 2020

Type species
- †Smitanosaurus agilis (Marsh, 1889)

Synonyms
- Camarasaurus agilis (Marsh, 1889); Morosaurus agilis Marsh, 1889

= Smitanosaurus =

Smitanosaurus Temporal range: Late Jurassic, 155.7–145.5 Ma

Extinct genus of sauropod dinosaurs

Smitanosaurus (meaning "smith lizard") is a genus of dicraeosaurid sauropod dinosaur from the Late Jurassic of Colorado. The genus contains one species, S. agilis, originally assigned to the defunct genus Morosaurus.

== History ==
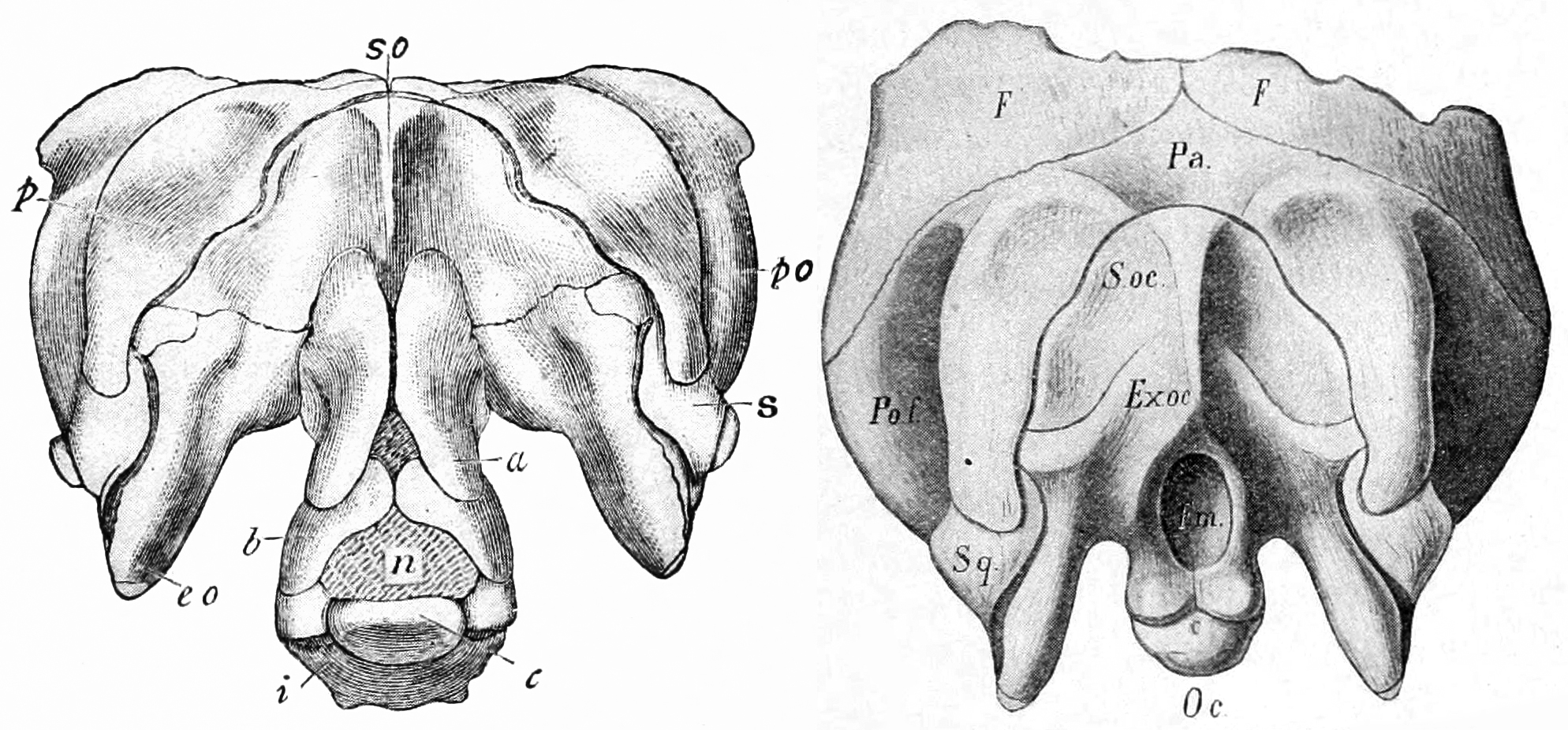
Skull shown from the back; left with proatlas (a) and atlas, and right in oblique view

The species Morosaurus agilis was originally named by Othniel Charles Marsh in 1889 for a partial skull, proatlases, and three cervical vertebrae found in 1883 in the Morrison Formation of Colorado. However, the genus Morosaurus was in 1907 reinterpreted as a junior synonym of Camarasaurus, and most of the species assigned to the former genus were reassigned to the latter. M. agilis, on the other hand, was left defunct without a proper generic assignment. Over time comparisons have been drawn with Haplocanthosaurus, Diplodocus and brachiosaurids, but never with a phylogenetic analysis. Further preparation and analysis by Whitlock & Wilson, 2020, have since reinterpreted it as a dicraeosaurid, warranting the new genus name Smitanosaurus. The new generic name means "smith lizard", from the Old Saxon smitan, referring to J. August Smith, who excavated and sketched the holotype USNM 5384, as well as the Smithsonian Institution, where the remains are stored.

== Classification ==
Whitlock & Wilson's redescription marks the first time S. agilis has been added to a phylogenetic analysis. They recovered it as a member of Dicraeosauridae, making it one of the ever-growing number of North American dicraeosaurids. Their cladogram is shown below:

- Dicraeosauridae
  - Kaatedocus
  - - Smitanosaurus
    - - - Bajadasaurus
        - - Lingwulong
          - MOR 592
      - - - Amargatitanis
          - Suuwassea
        - - Pilmatueia
          - - Dicraeosaurus
            - - Amargasaurus
              - Brachytrachelopan
