= Te Unua Museum of Southland =

New Zealand museum and art gallery

- Logo of Te Unua Museum of Southland

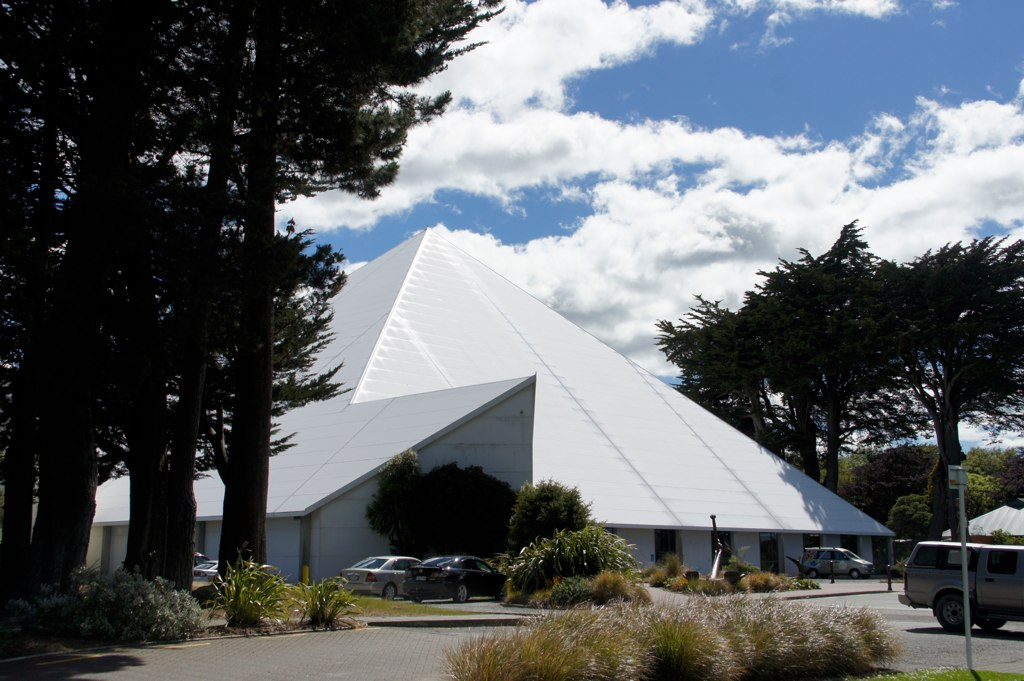
- Exterior view of the old building
- Former name: Southland Museum and Art Gallery
- Established: 1912; 114 years ago
- Location: Gala Street, Invercargill, New Zealand
- Coordinates: 46°24′19″S 168°21′12″E
- Website: teunua.nz

Te Unua Museum of Southland, previously known as the Southland Museum and Art Gallery Niho o te Taniwha is located in Gala Street, Invercargill, New Zealand. It is Southland's largest cultural and heritage institution, and contains a wide variety of the region's art, history and natural history collections. It was notable for its 1990 pyramid-shaped building, constructed over the original 1942 museum. In April 2018 the museum was closed indefinitely due to earthquake risks. The building was demolished in July 2024, in preparation for the construction of a new facility, Te Unua Museum of Southland, with official opening planned for 2027.

== Contents ==
=== Building ===
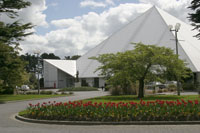
Southland Museum and Art Gallery Pyramid

The 1990 building, which encloses the previous museum building, was the largest pyramid in the Southern Hemisphere. It had a floor space of 5000 m^{2}, is 45 by 52 metres wide and 27 metres high.

=== Observatory ===
The museum observatory, the only public observatory in Southland, was operated by members of the Southland Astronomical Society, with school groups often visiting.

=== Tuatara ===
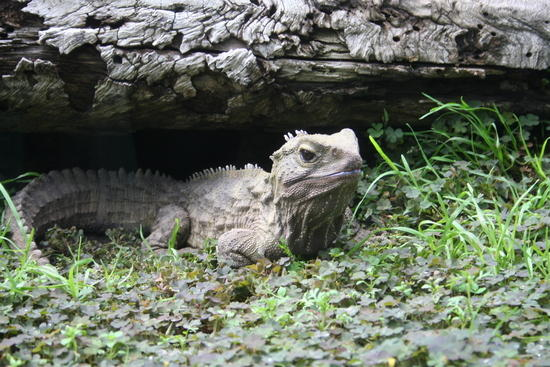
Tuatara enclosure

The tuatarium facility, built in 1974 and expanded to 200 m^{2} in 1990, houses over 50 live, individual tuatara ranging from new babies to the famous Henry. Henry, who joined the museum in 1970, is thought to have been born around the year 1900, and holds the world record for the tuatara kept longest in captivity. Henry mated for the first time in 2009. The tuatara breed regularly every two years, and from 1989 to 1995 produced eggs annually. A new acrylic roof that allowed ultraviolet light through to the tuatara has contributed to 100% egg hatching success and 100% survival success since installation. The tuatara were relocated in February 2023 in preparation for the demolition of the building. During this demolition of the building in 2024, four baby tuatara were found living in their former enclosure, by a contractor working on the demolition. They were likely to have been missed as eggs.

=== Galleries ===
Roaring '40s exhibition

The museum's Māori Gallery emphasised the everyday aspects of pre-contact life in Murihiku/(Southland). This included the processes of adze making, fishing using bone and stone lures, and musical instruments. The natural history gallery displayed rare and endangered species such as the kākāpō and kiwi, as well as subfossil bones of extinct birds such as moa. This gallery also covered subjects such as geology and sea life. "Beyond the Roaring 40's Gallery" interpreted the unique and vulnerable subantarctic themes and was developed utilising both museum and Department of Conservation expertise.

A fossil forest of petrified wood exists at Curio Bay on the southeast coast of Southland. A reconstruction of this, where visitors can walk among the stumps and tree sections of petrified wood 130 million years old, could be found in front of the museum along with two-metre bronze tuatara sculpture.

=== Art ===
The art galleries featured regular contemporary and historical art exhibitions, both travelling shows and works from permanent collections, often with a regional emphasis which includes Stewart Island and the Subantarctic Islands. The museum has a significant collection of art, photography, ceramics and craft; of special note is the work by William Hodges "A Maori before a waterfall in Dusky Bay " (1773), and Te Mauri, the large pounamu boulder that travelled to America as part of the Te Maori Exhibition in 1984.

== Exhibitions ==
Craigs Young Contemporaries

- 1971: Ann Crindley
- 1972: Bryan Poole
- 1973: Eve Skerrett
- 1974: Lindsay Hazley
- 1975: Janice Helm
- 1976: David Badcock
- 1977: Judith Ritchie
- 1978: Jeffrey Russell (Sculpture); Averill McLean (Painting); Helen de Ryk (Drawing)
- 1979: Erin McDermott
- 1980: Graham Brinsley
- 1981: Denise Hunter
- 1982: exhibition was split into two biennial exhibitions 19 to 30 and 13 to 18.
- 1982: Stephen Collie (age 13 – 18)
- 1983: Stephen Crowther (age 19 – 30)
- 1984: Vicki Deaker (age 13 – 18)
- 1985: Martin Young (age 19 – 30)
- 1986: Lyle Penisula (age 13 – 18)
- 1987: Lyle Penisula (age 19 – 30)
- 1988: Gaylene Barnes (age 13 – 18)
- 1989: No exhibition held due to the closure of the Southland Museum and Art Gallery for redevelopment
- 1990: Geoffrey Clarke (19–30)
- 1991: Jane Everett and Melanie Thomas (13–18)
- 1992: Louise Craig (19–30)
- 1993: Relda Wells (13–18)
- 1994: Damon Mueli (19 to 30)
- 1995: Bronwyn Campbell (13 to 18)
- 1996: Kyla Cresswell (19 to 30)
- 1997: Greg Lewis (15 to 30)
- 1998: Clem Devine

== History ==
Southland Museum and Art Gallery Niho o te Taniwha (the tooth of the taniwha) began as a small collection first exhibited in 1869 by Andrew McKenzie in his Invercargill "Scotch Pie House and Museum". The collection was purchased by the Invercargill Athenaeum in 1876 and transferred to the Southland Technical College by 1912.

The Southland Museum was opened by Invercargill Mayor, W B Scandrett, at the Southland Technical College on Wednesday 4 September 1912 at 3pm. J Crosby Smith FLS was the President of the Southland Naturalist Society and Curator.

Although a museum board was formed in 1915, the museum remained under the control of the Southland Education Board until it was constituted under the Southland Museum Board (Inc) in 1939. In 1959 Gordon White was appointed director. He had previously worked as a modeller under Valerie Norman at the Dominion Museum.

The original building at the entrance to Queen's Park was built as Southland's New Zealand Centennial memorial and opened in 1942, but without an art gallery due to insufficient funds. There have been many extensions to the original structure, with the art gallery opening in 1960, the additional of the Southland Astronomical Society Observatory in 1972, extensions to the building in 1977 and 1984, and a total redevelopment in 1990.

The period of redevelopment from the 1970s to the 1990s was credited to the leadership of Museum Director Russell Beck, and Chairman of the Southland Museum & Art Gallery Trust Board, Dr Alfred Philip (Alf) Poole (1922–2005).

This 1990 redevelopment enclosed the previous building in a 27 m tall pyramid, the largest in the Southern Hemisphere, added dedicated art gallery spaces, a Tuatarium Gallery for the captive tuatara breeding programme, and retailing spaces for the Artworks Cafe, Museum Shop 'Memento' and iSite Invercargill Visitor Information Centre.

== Closure ==
On 9 April 2018, the Invercargill City Council announced that the Southland Museum and Art Gallery building would close indefinitely to the public by the end of the week due to it being an earthquake risk. The Invercargill City Council claimed it had "critical structural weakness" that made it unsafe for large groups of visitors, being at less than 34% of the earthquake structural standard for new buildings. This followed the Invercargill water tower closing in 2012 and the Invercargill Public Art Gallery at Anderson House closing in 2014 for similar reasons.

The staff of 41 was reduced to 10: four curators and six working on collections. The museum plans to open a new exhibition space in central Invercargill in 2019, in collaboration with the Invercargill Public Art Gallery on the ground floor of the former bank building on the corner of Don and Kelvin streets. The council had budgeted $200,000 a year for four years to maintain a temporary facility. In July 2019, the large collection items had been removed from the upper floors of the museum, and the collection was prepared for relocation to a storage facility. The artefacts were later housed in the purpose-built storage facility owned and run by the Invercargill City Council, Te Pataka Taoka Southern Regional Collections Facility, in Tisbury, a suburb of Invercargill.

In the meantime, a temporary space, a collaboration between the Southland Museum and Art Gallery and the Invercargill Public Art Gallery (Anderson House), was opened to exhibit parts of their collections and hold events and exhibitions. This space, called Te Waka Tuia Art + Museum, is on Kelvin Place, and opened in 2020.

Demolition of the Southland Museum and Art Gallery building began in May 2024, but was temporarily paused after the discovery of the four baby tuatara living in the former enclosure. The demolition took some time, as there was an emphasis on recycling the building materials. It was fully demolished by July 2024. Te Unua Museum of Southland, the renamed rebuild, is currently planned to be open in 2027.

== See also ==
- Southland Astronomical Society

== Further reading about former directors ==
- John Herman (J H) Sorensen, Obituary
- David Teviotdale
- Olga Sansom
