= Peter Beck =

CEO of Rocket Lab

Sir Peter Beck KNZM
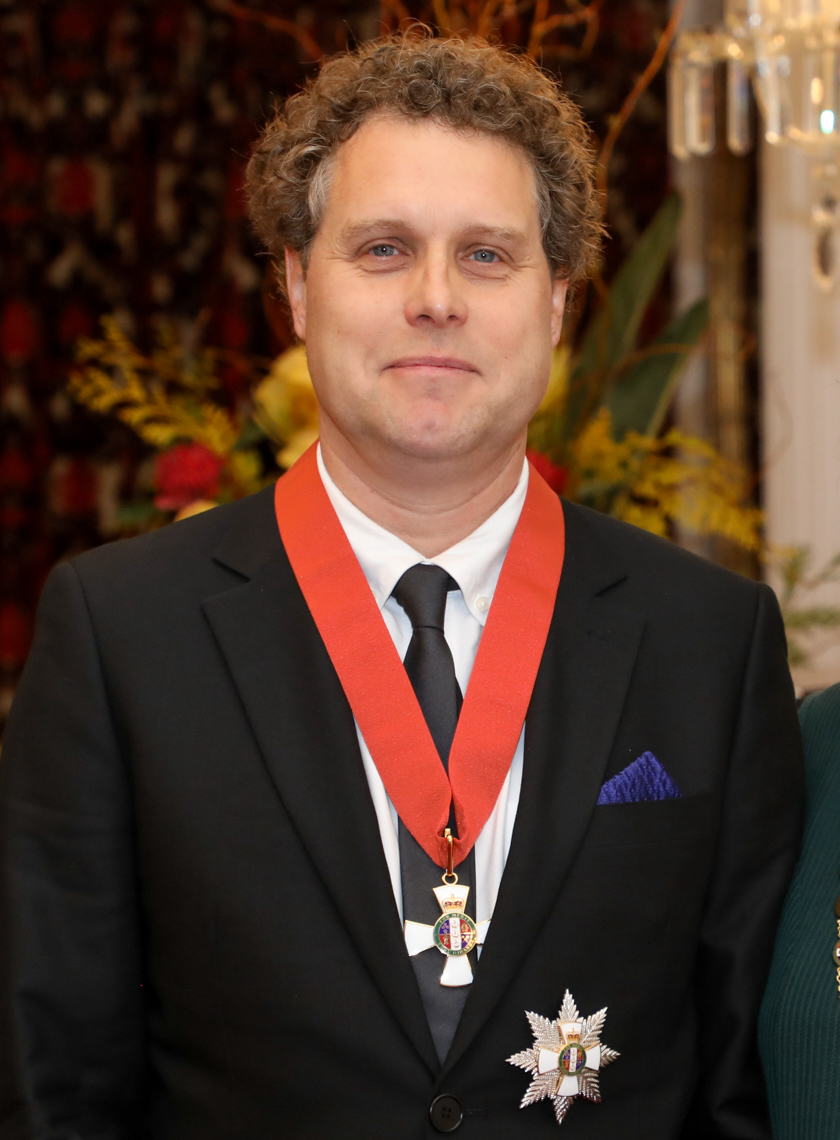
- Beck in 2024
- Born: 1976 or 1977 (age 49–50); Invercargill, New Zealand
- Title: CEO and CTO of Rocket Lab
- Children: 2
- Father: Russell Beck

Sir Peter Joseph Beck KNZM is a New Zealand entrepreneur and founder of Rocket Lab, an aerospace manufacturer and launch service provider. Before founding Rocket Lab, Beck worked in various occupations and built rocket-powered contraptions.

== Early life ==
Beck grew up in Invercargill, New Zealand, with two brothers, Andrew and John. His father, Russell Beck, was a museum and art gallery director and gemologist, and his mother was a teacher. As a teenager, he spent time turbocharging an old Mini and launching water rockets. Beck attended James Hargest College and didn't go to university.

In 1995, Beck became a tool-and-die-maker apprentice at company Fisher & Paykel. While working there, he taught himself and used the company workshop to experiment with rockets and propellants. Using these tools and materials, he created a rocket bike, rocket-attached scooter, and a jet pack. Later, Beck moved into the product design department and bought a cruise missile engine from the United States. It was while he was working at Fisher & Paykel that he met his wife, Kerryn Morris, an engineer and designer. He then worked in New Plymouth as a project engineer on a yacht.

He later worked at Industrial Research Limited between 2001 and 2006, working on smart materials, composites and superconductors. While working there, he met Stephen Tindall, who later became an early investor at Rocket Lab. In 2006, Beck accompanied his wife, who was on a work trip to the United States. While she worked, Beck travelled to Minnesota and met with Ky Michaelson, known as Rocketman, a rocketeer that he had contacted beforehand. Beck traveled across the US on a self-guided "rocket pilgrimage" visiting various aerospace facilities and US defense contractors, and met with people from NASA, Lockheed Martin, and other organizations. This inspired him to start Rocket Lab later that year.

== Business career ==
While contacting potential investors, Beck met New Zealand internet entrepreneur Mark Rocket, later becoming a key seed investor to Rocket Lab. Among other early investors into Rocket Lab was Stephen Tindall, Vinod Khosla, and the New Zealand Government. Three years later, in November 2009, Rocket Lab successfully launched the multi-stage rocket Ātea-1, becoming the first private company in the Southern Hemisphere to reach space.

Around 2013, Rocket Lab moved its registration from New Zealand to the United States, and opened headquarters in Huntington Beach, California. The company then developed and first launched the Electron rocket unsuccessfully in May 2017. The rocket's first successful launch happened in January 2018, deploying two CubeSats and the Humanity Star. In May 2022, the company attempted to recover an Electron booster with partial success. As of August 2025, the company has successfully launched in total 66 similar missions out of 70 attempts, with Electron's latest launch failure being its 41st flight in September 2023.

In June 2026, Beck was ranked number 3 on the NBR Rich List with an estimated net worth of $11 billion.

== Honours and awards ==
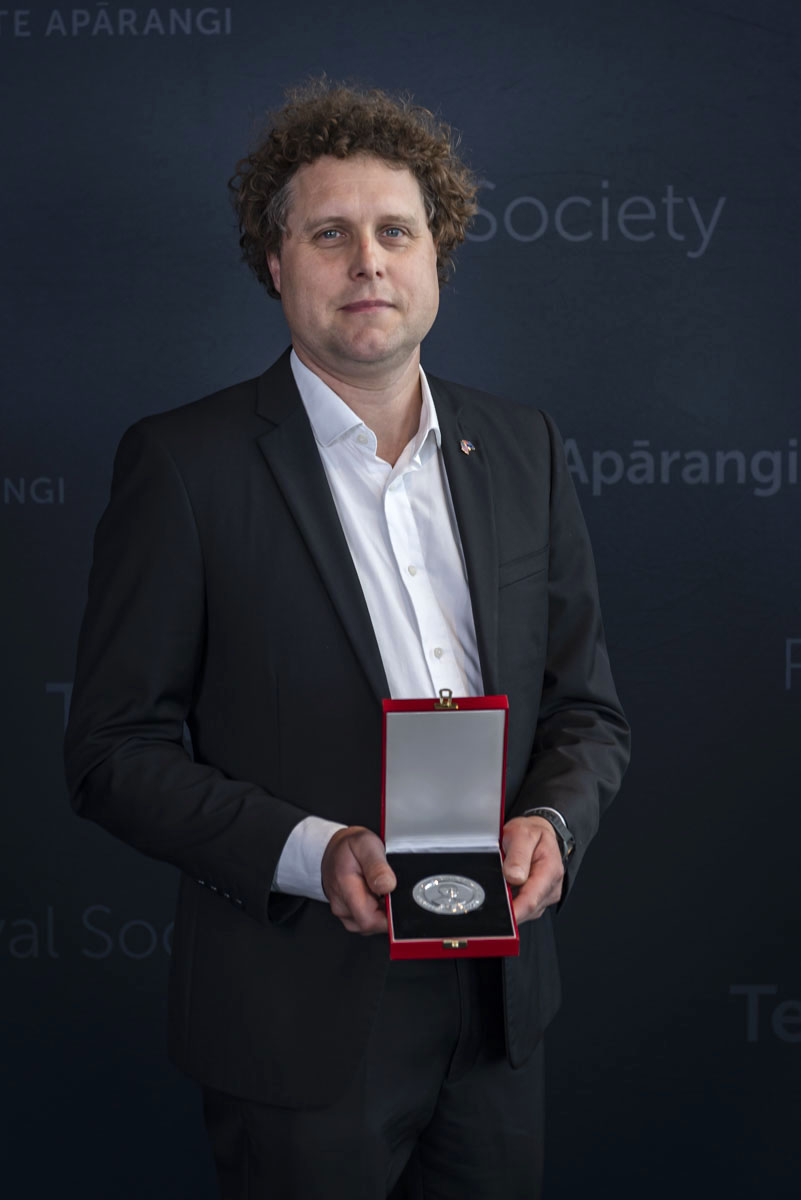
Beck receiving the Pickering Medal in 2020

In 2015, Beck received the New Zealander of the Year Award in the Innovator of the Year category. In 2019, he was appointed as an adjunct professor for the University of Auckland. Both Rocket Lab and Beck were awarded the Pickering Medal by the Royal Society Te Apārangi in 2020.

In 2023, Rocket Lab and Peter Beck were featured in Ashlee Vance's book, "When the Heavens went on Sale". In 2024, a documentary called "Wild Wild Space" was released by HBO, portraying the rivalry between two companies, Astra and Rocket Lab, and their respective CEOs, Chris Kemp and Peter Beck.

In the 2024 King's Birthday Honours, Beck was appointed a Knight Companion of the New Zealand Order of Merit, for services to the aerospace industry, business and education.
