= Southland Astronomical Society =

Organization in New Zealand

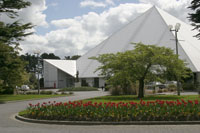
- Southland Museum and Art Gallery
- Formation: January 1, 1961; 65 years ago
- Type: NGO
- Location: Hearing Association rooms, 126 Leet Street, Invercargill, New Zealand
- Coordinates: 46.4074974°S 168.353312°E
- Region served: Invercargill, New Zealand
- Members: ~35
- Affiliations: Royal Astronomical Society of New Zealand
- Website: Southland Astronomical Society

The Southland Astronomical Society is the southernmost astronomical society in the world. Based in Invercargill at the southern tip of New Zealand's South Island, its small, active group of about 36 amateur astronomer members participate in a variety of astronomical activities including education with groups and school children, deep sky observing, astrophotography and aurora observation.

The society operates the Southland Astronomical Society Observatory and telescope at the Southland Museum and Art Gallery, with public viewing nights during the winter (April to September). The telescope is a fork mounted 30 cm (12 inch) diameter Cassegrain design.

The society meets monthly to discuss general astronomical topics and receive presentations of astronomical interest. The society has a small library which holds a range of astronomical texts and magazines both contemporary and historical. The society publishes a monthly newsletter for members.
