= Southland Astronomical Society Observatory =

- Location: 108 Gala Street, Invercargill, New Zealand
- Coordinates: 46.40525°S 168.35287°E
- Website: http://homepage.mac.com/stevoss/SAS/

Southland Astronomical Society Observatory in Invercargill is New Zealand's southernmost observatory. Operated by Southland Astronomical Society but owned by the Southland Museum and Art Gallery, it is situated on the western side of the museum building.

The primary telescope in use is a fork mounted 30 cm (12 inch) diameter Cassegrain design. The telescope can also be operated in the classical Newtonian configuration by removing the secondary mirror. It was built by Russell Beck.

Public viewing nights are each Wednesday, 7pm to 9pm, from April to September while daylight saving time is not in effect.
