= 2006 State Twenty20 Cricket Knock-Out Tournament =

Cricket tournament

The 2006 State Twenty20 Cricket Knock-Out Tournament was a domestic Twenty20 tournament in New Zealand. The tournament was held in Invercargill on 10-12 November 2006.

A prize of $30,000 was on offer for the winners of the tournament. Teams representing the six senior cricket associations of New Zealand (Auckland, Northern Districts, Wellington, Central Districts, Canterbury and Otago) took part, but owing to inclement weather only 4 of the 9 scheduled matches took place.

== Venues ==
- Queen's Park
- Southland Boys' High School

== Results ==
Date	Team	Team	Result	Venue
10 November 2006	Canterbury 152-8 (20 overs)	Auckland 153-7 (18.1 overs)	Auckland won by 3 wickets	Southland Boys' High School
10 November 2006	Otago 174-8 (20 overs)	Northern Districts 177-6 (20 overs)	Northern Districts won by 4 wickets	Southland Boys' High School
11 November 2006	Auckland 140-7 (20 overs)	Central Districts 99-5 (11 overs)	Central Districts won by 19 runs D/L Method	Queens Park
11 November 2006	Wellington 185-6 (20 overs)	Northern Districts 113-7 (14 overs)	Wellington won by 27 runs D/L Method	Southland Boys' High School
11 November 2006	Wellington	Canterbury	Abandoned without a ball being bowled	Queens Park
11 November 2006	Otago	Central Districts	Abandoned without a ball being bowled	Southland Boys' High School
12 November 2006 (Semi-Final No 1)	Wellington	Auckland	Abandoned without a ball being bowled	Queens Park
12 November 2006 (Semi-Final No 2)	Central Districts	Northern Districts	Abandoned without a ball being bowled	Southland Boys' High School
12 November 2006 (Final)	Wellington	Central Districts	Abandoned without a ball being bowled	Queens Park
