= Russell Beck =

New Zealand artist and museum director

Russell Beck ONZM
- Born: Russell Joseph Beck; 21 February 1941; Invercargill, New Zealand
- Died: 10 February 2018 (aged 76); Invercargill, New Zealand
- Known for: Museum director, artist
- Children: 3, including Peter Beck (son)

Russell Joseph Beck ONZM (21 February 1941 – 10 February 2018) was a New Zealand archaeologist, museum curator, and artist. He has three children, one of whom is Peter Beck, founder of aerospace company Rocket Lab.

== Biography ==
Beck came from an old settler family in Southland, with his great-grandfather arriving in 1863. He was one of six children (four girls, two boys) and was educated at Waihopai Primary School and then Southland Technical College.

He had a wide interest in science which was developed at secondary school. He developed an interest in geology when aged 10 or 11 when digging a long-drop toilet at the family's crib (holiday home) in Te Anau, and took up astronomy and built a six-inch reflecting telescope which formed the basis of a home observatory, followed in 1959 by a 12-inch Cassegrain telescope which he later donated to the Southland Museum and Art Gallery and installed in the observatory constructed in 1972.

From 1961, Beck began volunteering his weekends at Southland Museum while undertaking a motor mechanic apprenticeship in his father's business, and he was offered a job at the museum in 1965. In 1976, Beck was appointed as museum director following Arthur McKenzie.

Throughout his career, Beck's research focused on jade from around the world, producing five books on the topic, and creating the Beck International Jade Research Collection (now housed by GNS Science in Lower Hutt). He became known as a qualified gemmologist and skilled mineralogist, particularly when working with pounamu, and undertook efforts to educate and support local Māori on pounamu.

Beck helped to establish a restricted area in the Mount Aspiring National Park, which is now a tōpuni (protected area), to protect iwi access to pounamu deposits. Beck also supported Ngāi Tahu leaders in a variety of aspects, including managing the physical environment and reburying kōiwi (human bodies). He was also a trustee for the Te Maori pounamu mauri stone which accompanied the exhibition in 1984.

Anchor Chain Sculpture, Russell Beck, Lee Bay, Rakiura Track

Beck supported local artists, and produced a large number of works in and around Southland. He was also an artist himself, creating the controversial giant chain connecting Bluff to Stewart Island / Rakiura at Stirling Point with his three sons and his wife, Ann. Some of his jade sculptures are held in Dowse Art Museum collections.

== Honours ==
In the 2000 New Year Honours, Beck was appointed an Officer of the New Zealand Order of Merit, for services to art and local history.
