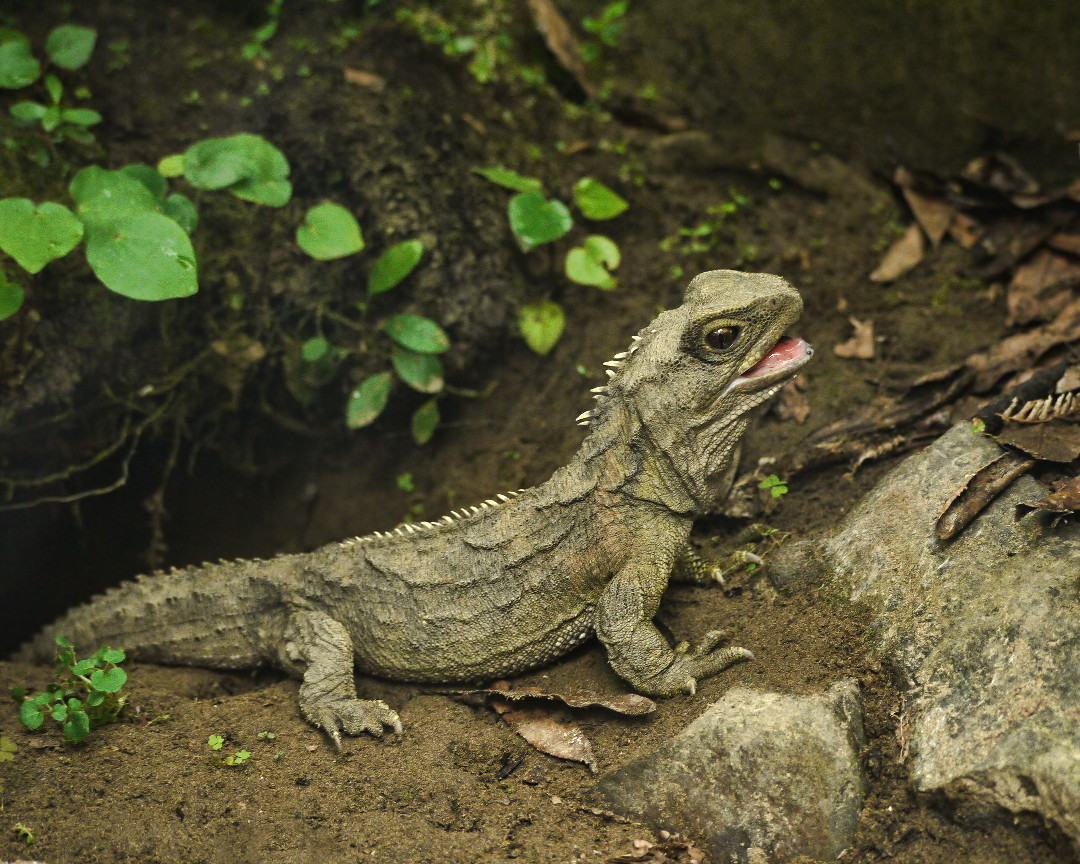
- Northern tuatara (Sphenodon punctatus punctatus)

Conservation status
- Least Concern (IUCN 3.1)

- Relict (NZ TCS)

Scientific classification
- Kingdom: Animalia
- Phylum: Chordata
- Class: Reptilia
- Order: Rhynchocephalia
- Family: Sphenodontidae
- Subfamily: Sphenodontinae
- Genus: Sphenodon; Gray, 1831 (conserved name)
- Species: S. punctatus

Binomial name
- Sphenodon punctatus (Gray, 1842) (conserved name)
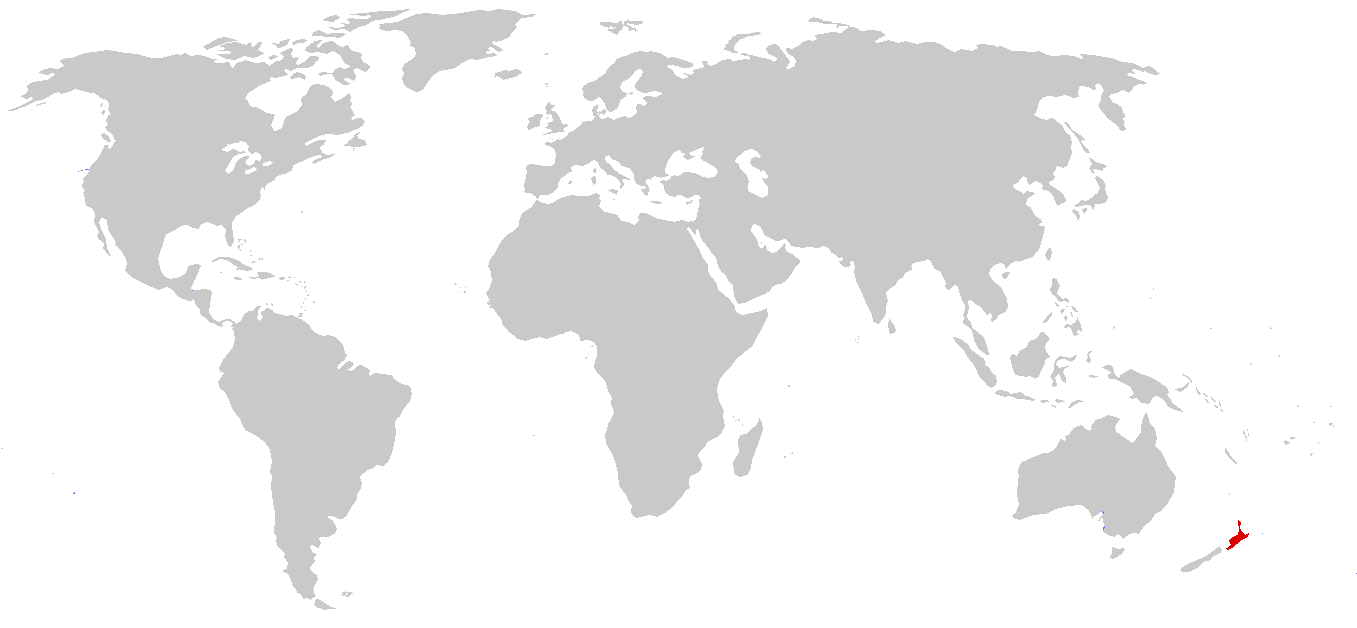
- Native range (New Zealand)
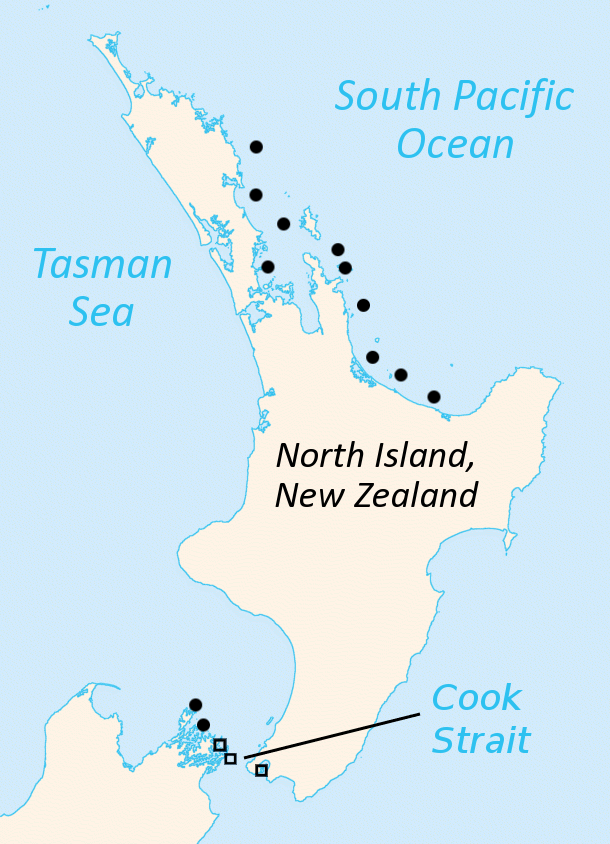
- Current distribution of tuatara (in black): Circles represent the North Island tuatara, and squares the Brothers Island tuatara. Symbols may represent up to seven islands.

Synonyms
- Sphaenodon Gray, 1831 (rejected name); Hatteria Gray, 1842 (rejected name); Rhynchocephalus Owen, 1845 (rejected name)

= Tuatara =

Tuatara Temporal range: Early Miocene – present, 19–0 Ma

Species of reptile

The tuatara (/tuːəˈtɑːrə/, Māori: [ˈtʉ.a.ta.ɾa]; Sphenodon punctatus) is a species of reptile endemic to New Zealand. Despite its close resemblance to lizards, it is the only extant member of a distinct lineage, the previously highly diverse order Rhynchocephalia. The name tuatara is derived from the Māori language and means "peaks on the back".

The single extant species of tuatara (Note: A second species, the Brothers Island tuatara S. guntheri (Buller, 1877), was recognised in 1989, but since 2009 it has been reclassified as a subspecies, S. p. guntheri.) is the only surviving member of its order, which was highly diverse during the Mesozoic era. Rhynchocephalians first appeared in the fossil record during the Middle Triassic, around 244–241.5 million years ago, and reached worldwide distribution and peak diversity during the Jurassic, when they represented the world's dominant group of small reptiles. Rhynchocephalians declined during the Cretaceous, with their youngest records outside New Zealand dating to the Paleocene. Their closest living relatives are squamates (lizards and snakes). Tuatara are of interest for studying the evolution of reptiles.

Tuatara are greenish brown and grey, and measure up to 80 cm (31 in) from head to tail-tip and weigh up to 1.3 kg (2.9 lb) with a spiny crest along the back, especially pronounced in males. They have a second row of upper teeth on the roof of the mouth. They are able to hear, although no external ear is present, and have a number of unusual features in their skeleton compared to lizards, including gastralia in the belly, proatlas bones in the neck, and a completely fused temporal bar at the back of the skull.

Tuatara are sometimes referred to as "living fossils". This term is currently deprecated among paleontologists and evolutionary biologists. Although tuatara have preserved the morphological characteristics of their Mesozoic ancestors (240–230 million years ago), there is no evidence of a continuous fossil record to support the idea that the species has survived unchanged since that time.

The tuatara has been protected by law since 1895. Tuatara, like many of New Zealand's native animals, are threatened by habitat loss and introduced predators, such as the Polynesian rat (Rattus exulans). Tuatara were extinct on the mainland, with the remaining populations confined to 32 offshore islands, until the first North Island release into the heavily fenced and monitored Karori Wildlife Sanctuary (now named "Zealandia") in 2005. During routine maintenance work at Zealandia in late 2008, a tuatara nest was uncovered, with a hatchling found the following autumn. This is thought to be the first case of tuatara successfully breeding in the wild on New Zealand's North Island in over 200 years.

== Taxonomy and evolution ==
Relationships of the tuatara to other living reptiles and birds, after Simões et al. 2022

- Reptilia
  - Lepidosauria
    - Squamata (lizards and snakes)
    - Rhynchocephalia (tuatara)
  - Archelosauria
    - Testudines (turtles, including tortoises)
    - Archosauria
      - Crocodilia (crocodilians)
      - Aves (birds)

Tuatara, along with other now-extinct members of the order Rhynchocephalia, belong to the superorder Lepidosauria, as do the order Squamata, which includes lizards and snakes. Squamates and tuatara both show caudal autotomy (loss of the tail-tip when threatened), and have transverse cloacal slits.

Tuatara were originally classified as lizards in 1831 when the British Museum received a skull. John Edward Gray used the name Sphenodon to describe the skull; this remains the current scientific name for the genus. Sphenodon is derived from the Greek for "wedge" (σφήν, σφηνός/sphenos) and "tooth" (ὀδούς, ὀδόντος/odontos). In 1842, Gray described a member of the species as Hatteria punctata, not realising that it and the skull he received in 1831 were both tuatara.

The genus remained misclassified as a lizard until 1867, when Albert C. L. G. Günther of the British Museum noted features similar to birds, turtles, and crocodiles. He proposed the order Rhynchocephalia (meaning "beak head") for the tuatara and its fossil relatives. Since 1869, Sphenodon punctatus (or the variation Sphenodon punctatum in some earlier sources) has been used as the scientific name for the species.

At one point, many disparate species were incorrectly referred to the Rhynchocephalia, resulting in what taxonomists call a "wastebasket taxon". Williston in 1925 proposed the Sphenodontia to include only tuatara and their closest fossil relatives. However, Rhynchocephalia is the older name and in widespread use today. Many scholars use Sphenodontia as a subset of Rhynchocephalia, including almost all members of Rhynchocephalia, apart from the most primitive representatives of the group.

The earliest rhynchocephalian, Agriodontosaurus, is known from the Middle Triassic (Anisian) of England, around 244 to 241.5 million years ago. During the Late Triassic, rhynchocephalians greatly diversified, going on to become the world's dominant group of small reptiles during the Jurassic period, when the group was represented by a diversity of forms, including the aquatic pleurosaurs and the herbivorous eilenodontines. The earliest members of Sphenodontinae, the clade which includes the tuatara, are known from the Early Jurassic of North America around 190 million years ago. The earliest sphenodontines are already very morphologically similar to the modern tuatara. Rhynchocephalians declined during the Cretaceous period, possibly due to competition with mammals and lizards, with their youngest record outside of New Zealand being of Kawasphenodon (which may be a sphenodontine), known from the early Paleocene (c. 66–60 million years ago) of southern Patagonia in South America.

Fossil material that can be referred to as sphenodontine is known from the early Miocene (c. 19–16 million years ago) Saint Bathans fauna of Otago in the South Island of New Zealand. Whether these specimens are referable to the genus Sphenodon proper is not entirely clear due to their incomplete nature, but they are likely to be from a taxon that is closely related to tuatara. Therefore, the ancestors of the tuatara were likely already present in New Zealand prior to its separation from Antarctica around 82–60 million years ago.

Cladogram of the position of the tuatara within Sphenodontia, after Simoes et al., 2022:

- Sphenodontia
  - †Diphydontosaurus
  - Eusphenodontia
    - †Planocephalosaurus
    - †Clevosaurus
    - Neosphenodontia
      - - - †Homoeosaurus
          - Pleurosauridae
            - †Palaeopleurosaurus
            - - †Derasmosaurus
              - †Pleurosaurus
          - - - †Leptosaurus
              - †Kallimodon
            - Sapheosauridae
              - †Piocormus
              - †Oenosaurus
              - †Sapheosaurus
        - Sphenodontidae
          - Eilenodontinae
            - †Sphenotitan
            - - †Eilenodon
              - - †Toxolophosaurus
                - †Priosphenodon
          - Sphenodontinae
            - †Navajosphenodon
            - †Cynosphenodon
            - - †Sphenofontis
              - - †Kawasphenodon
                - Sphenodon (tuatara)

=== Species ===
While there is currently considered to be only one living species of tuatara, two species were previously identified: Sphenodon punctatus, or northern tuatara, and the much rarer Sphenodon guntheri, or Brothers Island tuatara, which is confined to North Brother Island in Cook Strait. The specific name punctatus is Latin for "spotted", and guntheri refers to German-born British herpetologist Albert Günther. A 2009 paper re-examined the genetic bases used to distinguish the two supposed species of tuatara, and concluded they represent only geographic variants, and only one species should be recognised. Consequently, the northern tuatara was re-classified as Sphenodon punctatus punctatus and the Brothers Island tuatara as Sphenodon punctatus guntheri. The Brothers Island tuatara has olive brown skin with yellowish patches, while the colour of the northern tuatara ranges from olive green through grey to dark pink or brick red, often mottled, and always with white spots. In addition, the Brothers Island tuatara is considerably smaller. However, individuals from Brothers Island could not be distinguished from other modern and fossil samples on the basis of jaw morphology.

An extinct species of Sphenodon was identified in November 1885 by William Colenso, who was sent an incomplete subfossil specimen from a local coal mine. Colenso named the new species S. diversum. Fawcett and Smith (1970) consider it a synonym to the subspecies, based on a lack of distinction.

== Description ==
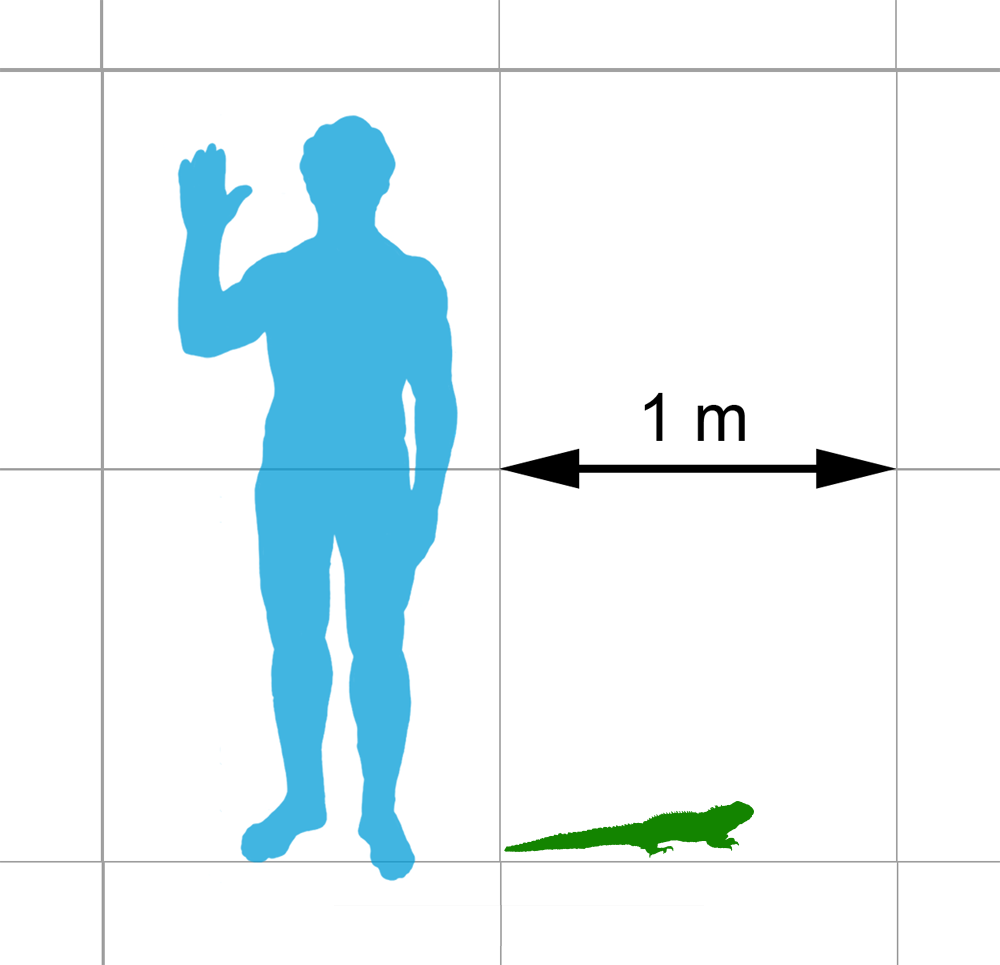
Size comparison of male S. punctatus and human

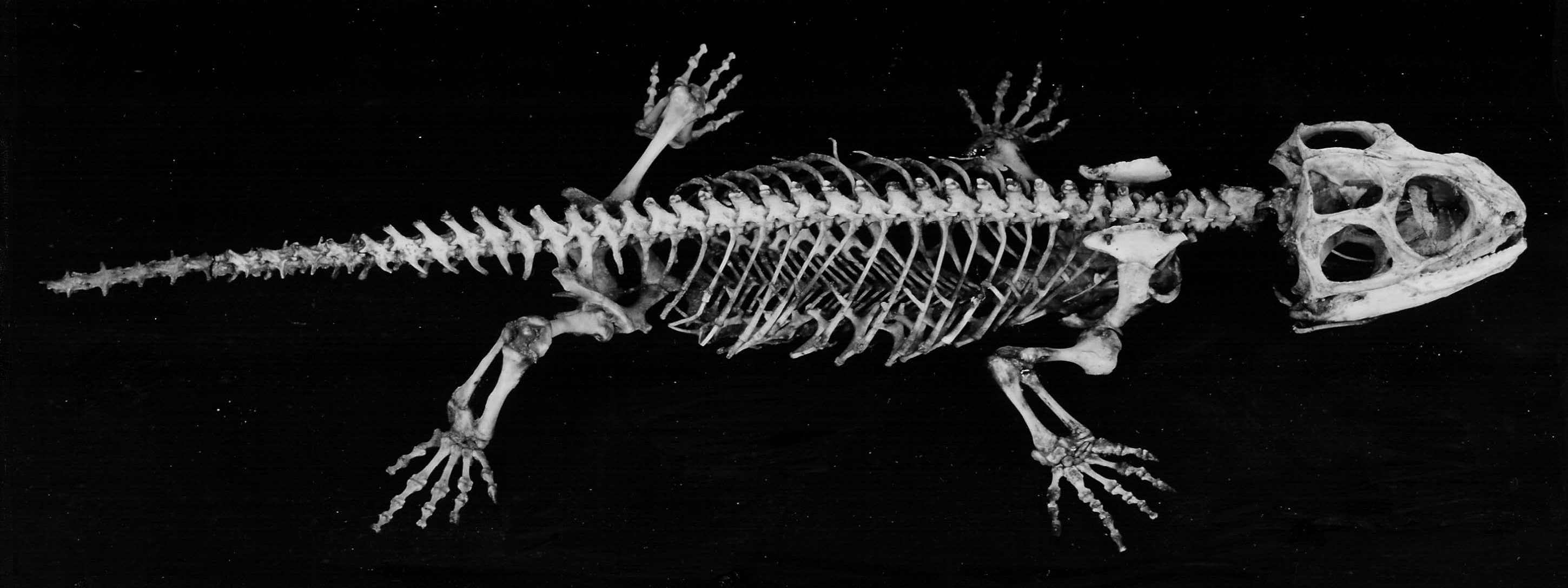
Skeleton of the tuatara

Tuatara are the largest reptiles in New Zealand. Adult S. punctatus males measure 61 cm (24 in) in length and females 45 cm (18 in). Tuatara are sexually dimorphic, males being larger. The San Diego Zoo even cites a length of up to 80 cm (31 in). Males weigh up to 1 kg (2.2 lb), and females up to 0.5 kg (1.1 lb). Brothers Island tuatara are slightly smaller, weighing up to 660 g (1.3 lb).

Their lungs have a single chamber with no bronchi.

The tuatara's greenish brown colour matches its environment, and can change over its lifetime. Tuatara shed their skin at least once per year as adults, and three or four times a year as juveniles. Tuatara sexes differ in more than size. The spiny crest on a tuatara's back, made of triangular, soft folds of skin, is larger in males, and can be stiffened for display. The male abdomen is narrower than the female's.

=== Skull ===
External 3D model
- Rotatable 3D model of the skull of the tuatara with labeled and coloured bones

Skull diagram in top down and side-on views

Unlike the vast majority of lizards, the tuatara has a complete lower temporal bar closing the lower temporal fenestra (an opening of the skull behind the eye socket), caused by the fusion of the quadrate/quadratojugal (which are fused into a single element in adult tuatara) and the jugal bones of the skull. This is similar to the condition found in some primitive diapsid reptiles. However, because more primitive rhynchocephalians have an open lower temporal fenestra with an incomplete temporal bar, this is thought to be a derived characteristic of the tuatara and other members of the clade Sphenodontinae, rather than a primitive trait retained from early diapsids. The complete bar is thought to stabilise the skull during biting.

The tip of the upper jaw is chisel- or beak-like and separated from the remainder of the jaw by a notch, this structure is formed from fused premaxillary teeth, and is also found in many other advanced rhynchocephalians. The teeth of the tuatara, and almost all other rhynchocephalians, are described as acrodont, as they are attached to the apex of the jaw bone. This contrast with the pleurodont condition found in the vast majority of lizards, where the teeth are attached to the inward-facing surface of the jaw. The teeth of the tuatara are extensively fused to the jawbone, making the boundary between the tooth and jaw difficult to discern, and the teeth lack roots and are not replaced during the lifetime of the animal, unlike those of pleurodont lizards. It is a common misconception that tuatara lack teeth and instead have sharp projections on the jaw bone; histology shows that they have true teeth with enamel and dentine with pulp cavities. As their teeth wear down, older tuatara have to switch to softer prey, such as earthworms, larvae, and slugs, and eventually have to chew their food between smooth jaw bones.

The tuatara possesses palatal dentition (teeth growing from the bones of the roof of the mouth), which is ancestrally present in reptiles (and tetrapods generally). While many of the original palatal teeth present in reptiles have been lost, as in all other known rhynchocephalians, the row of teeth growing from the palatine bones in the tuatara have been enlarged, and as in other members of Sphenodontinae the palatine teeth are orientated parallel to the teeth in the maxilla; during biting the teeth of the lower jaw slot between the two upper tooth rows. The structure of the jaw joint allows the lower jaw to slide forwards after it has closed between the two upper rows of teeth. This mechanism allows the jaws to shear through chitin and bone.

The brain of Sphenodon fills only half of the volume of its endocranium. This proportion has been used by paleontologists trying to estimate the volume of dinosaur brains based on fossils. However, the proportion of the tuatara endocranium occupied by its brain may not be a very good guide to the same proportion in Mesozoic dinosaurs since modern birds are surviving dinosaurs but have brains which occupy a much greater relative volume in the endocranium.

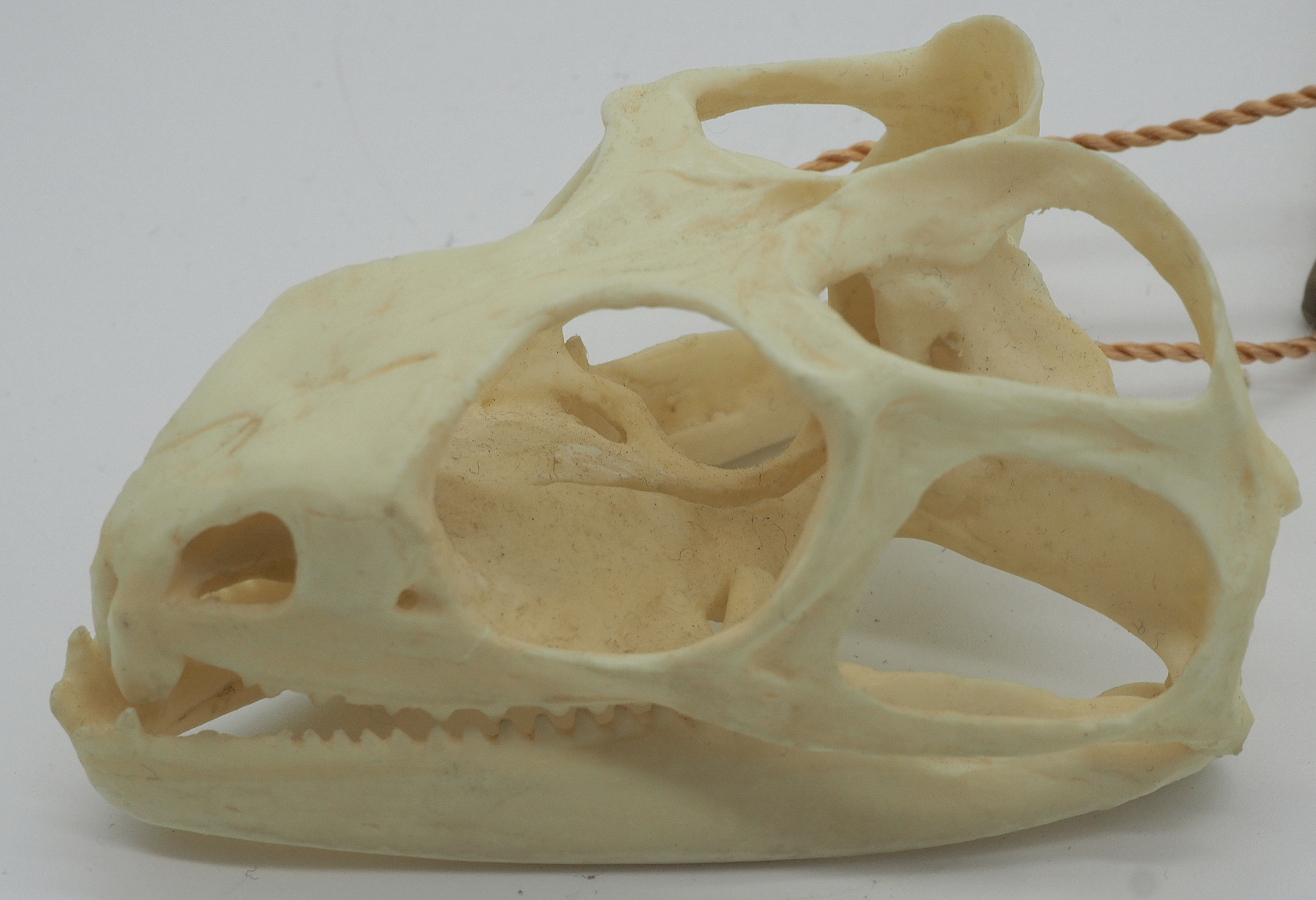
Skull of the tuatara in oblique view

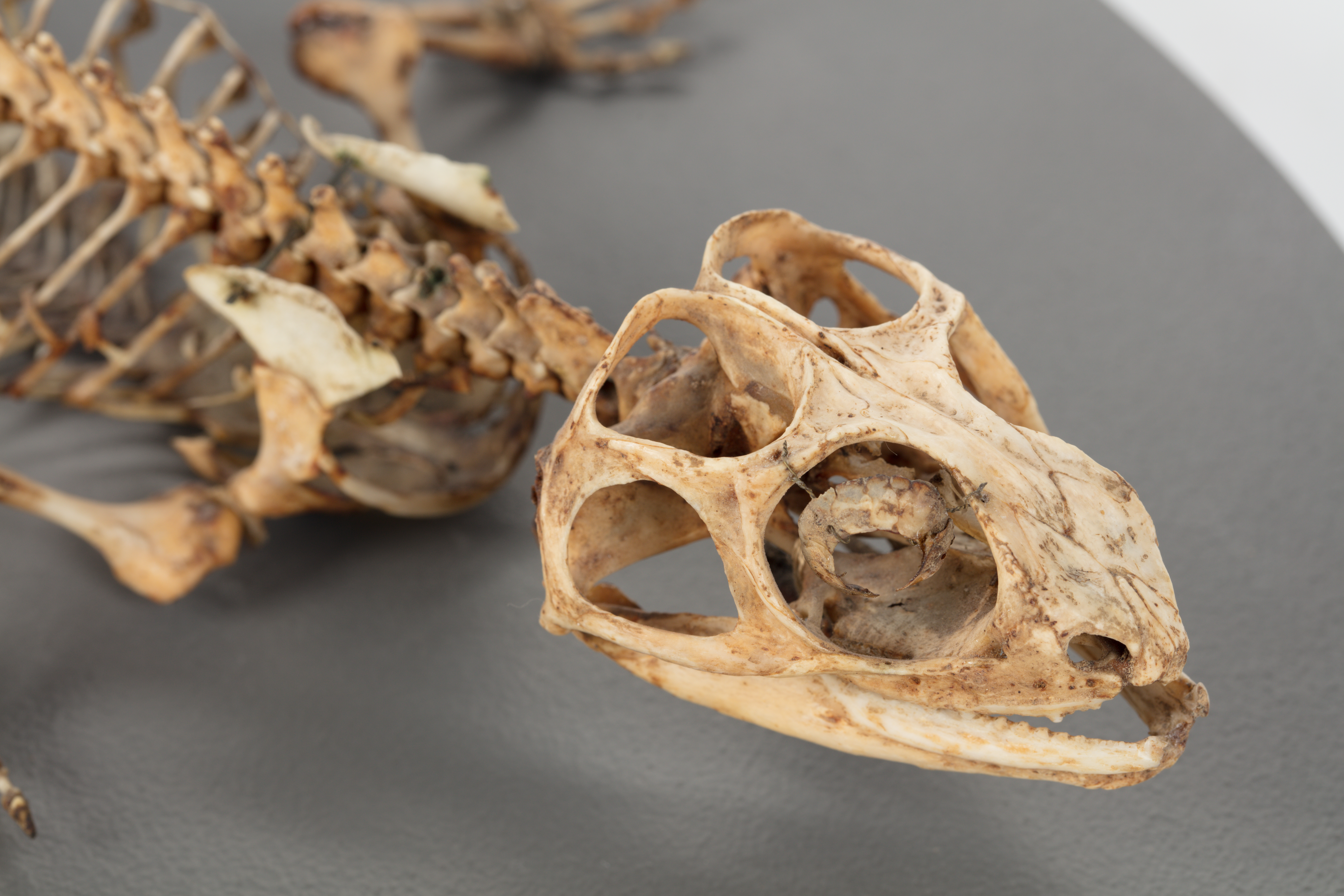
Skull of the tuatara in oblique view, with scleral rings in eye sockets

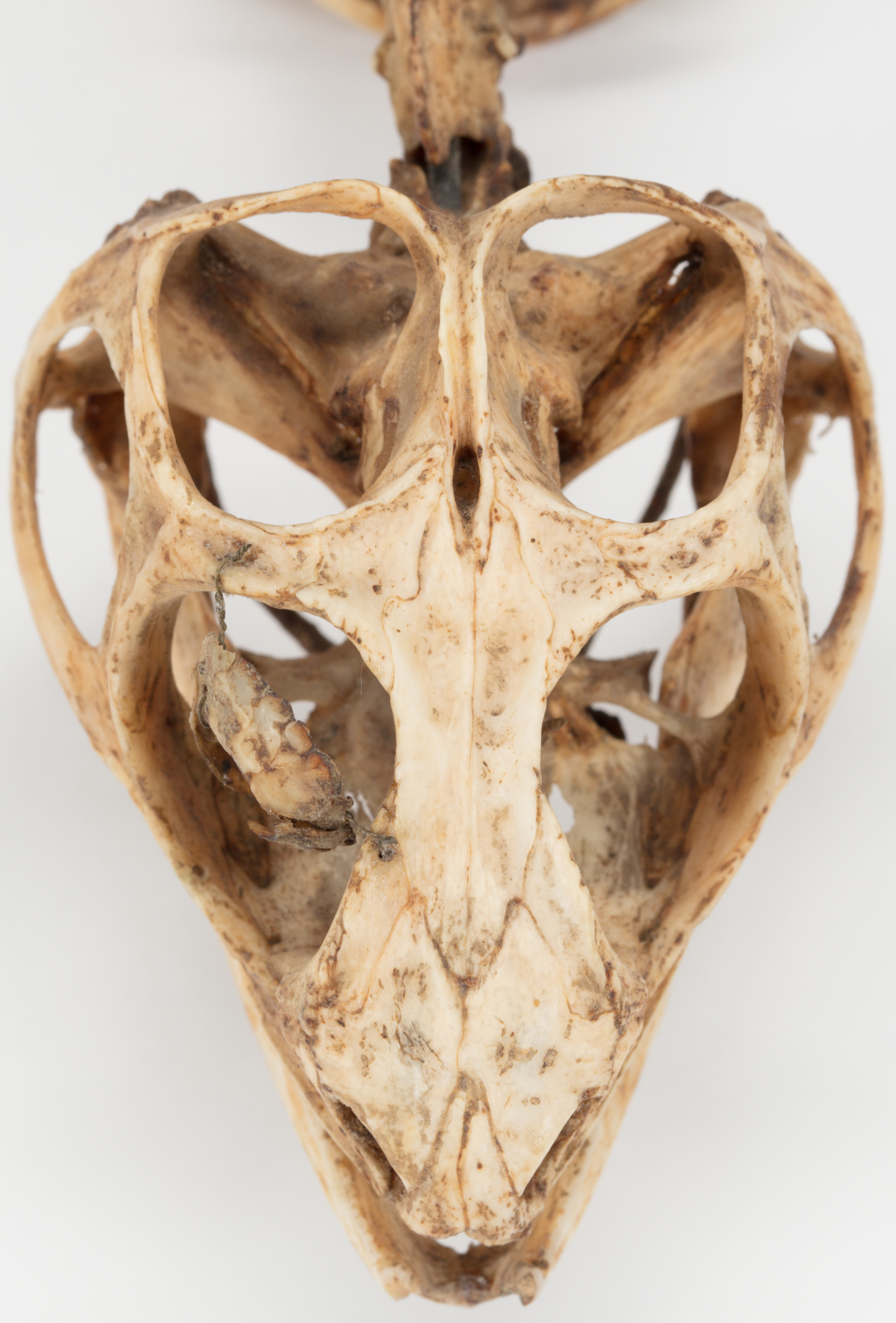
Skull of tuatara from above

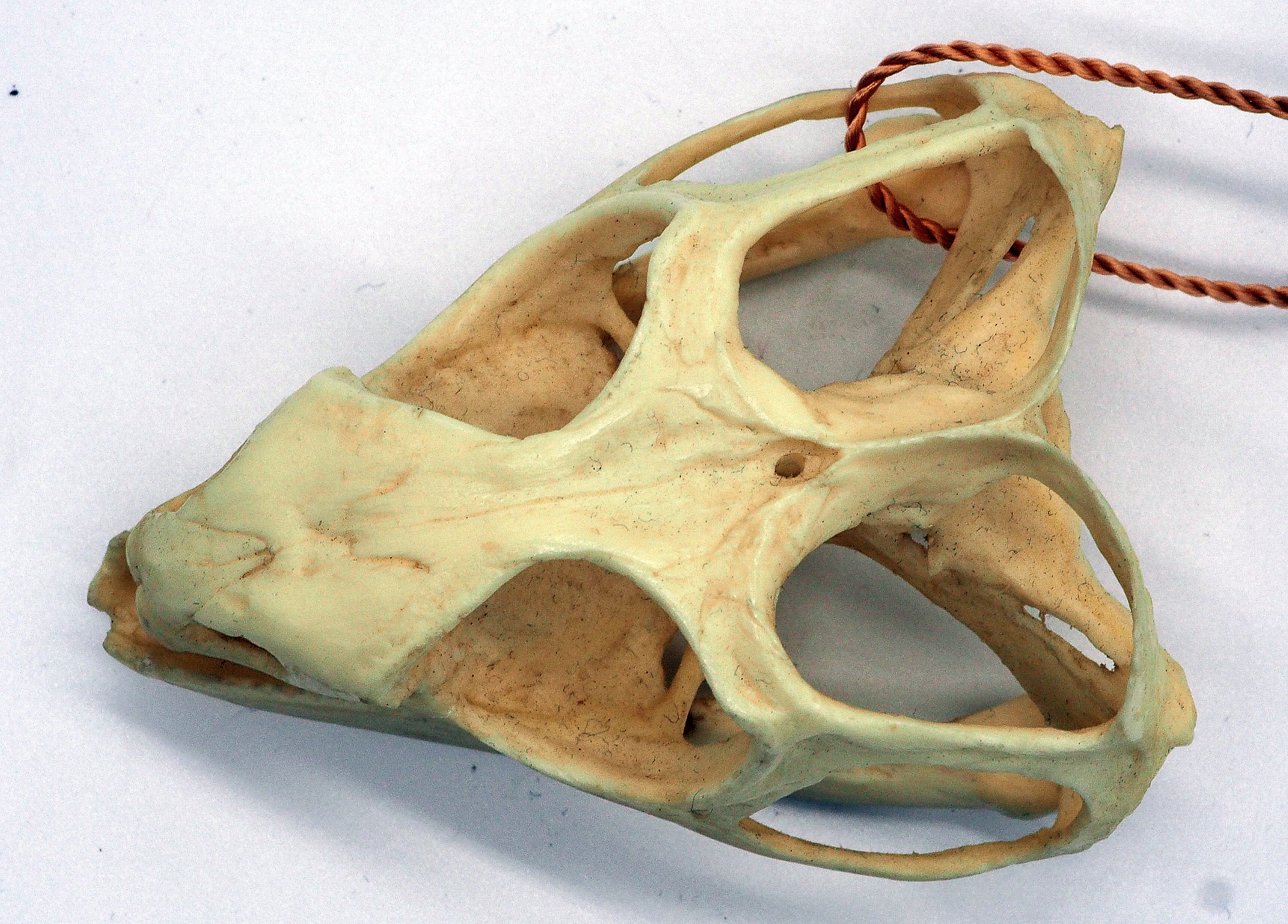
Skull of tuatara from above

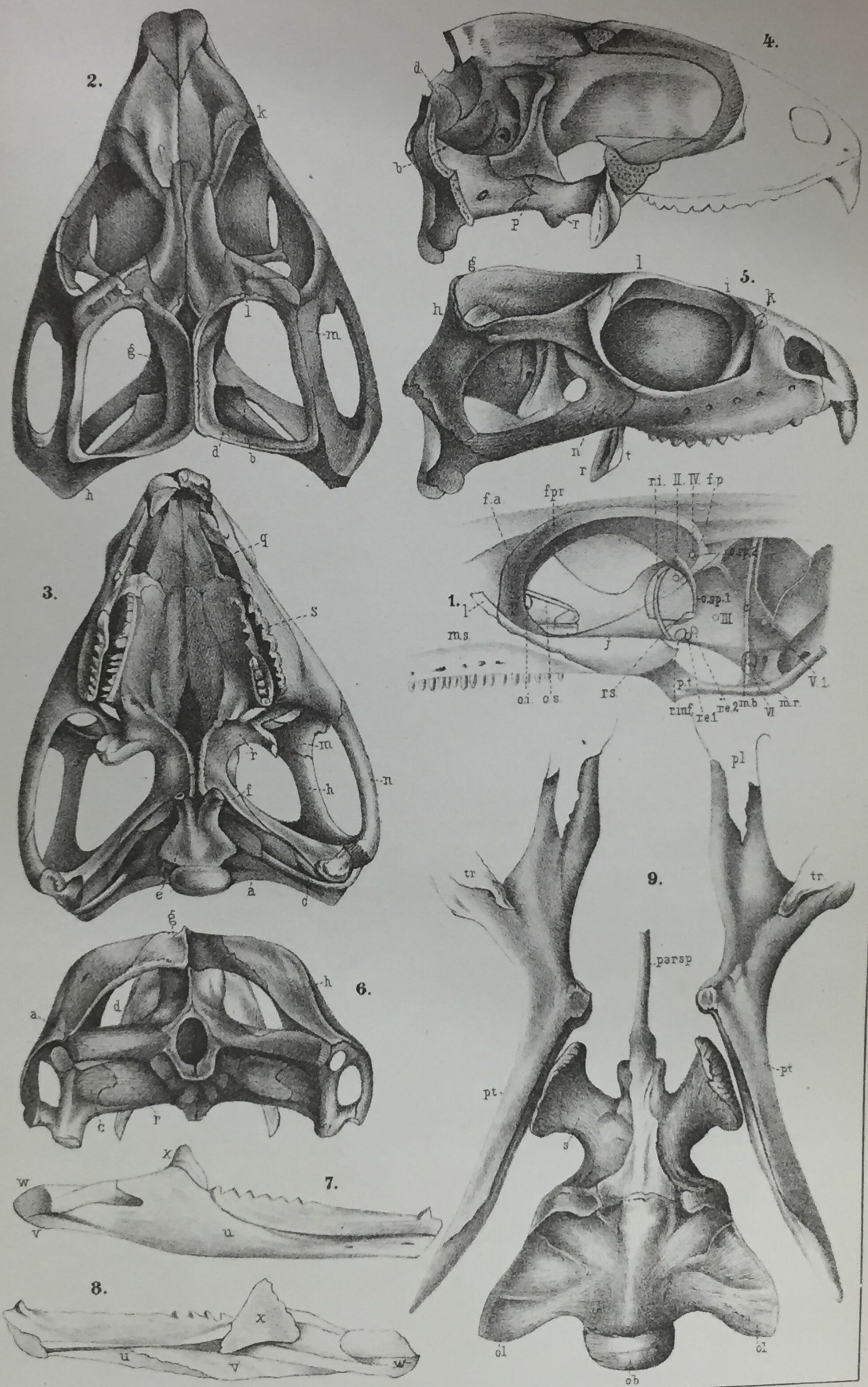
Tuatara skull in various views with palatine tooth row visible on underside of the skull

=== Sensory organs ===
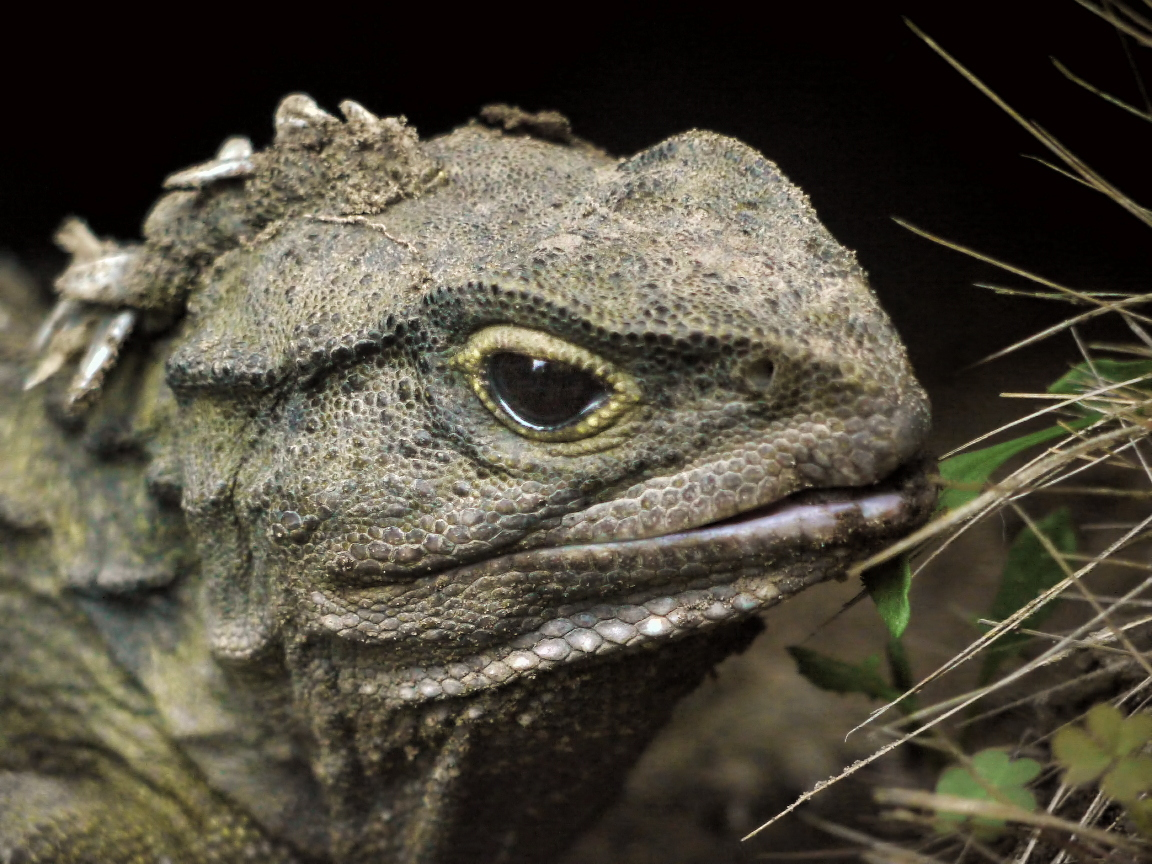
Close-up of a tuatara's head

==== Eyes ====
The eyes can focus independently, and are specialised with three types of photoreceptive cells, all with fine structural characteristics of retinal cone cells used for both day and night vision, and a tapetum lucidum which reflects onto the retina to enhance vision in the dark. There is also a third eyelid on each eye, the nictitating membrane. Five visual opsin genes are present, suggesting good colour vision, possibly even at low light levels.

==== Parietal eye (third eye) ====
Like some other living vertebrates, including some lizards, the tuatara has a third eye on the top of its head called the parietal eye (also called a pineal or third eye) formed by the parapineal organ, with an accompanying opening in the skull roof called the pineal or parietal foramen, enclosed by the parietal bones. It has its own lens, a parietal plug which resembles a cornea, retina with rod-like structures, and degenerated nerve connection to the brain. The parietal eye is visible only in hatchlings, which have a translucent patch at the top centre of the skull. After four to six months, it becomes covered with opaque scales and pigment. While capable of detecting light, it is probably not capable of detecting movement or forming an image. It likely serves to regulate the circadian rhythm and possibly detect seasonal changes, and help with thermoregulation.

Of all extant tetrapods, the parietal eye is most pronounced in the tuatara. It is part of the pineal complex, another part of which is the pineal gland, which in tuatara secretes melatonin at night. Some salamanders have been shown to use their pineal bodies to perceive polarised light, and thus determine the position of the sun, even under cloud cover, aiding navigation.

==== Hearing ====
Together with turtles, the tuatara has the most primitive hearing organs among the amniotes. There is no tympanum (eardrum) and no earhole, and the middle ear cavity is filled with loose tissue, mostly adipose tissue (fat). The stapes comes into contact with the quadrate (which is immovable), as well as the hyoid and squamosal. The hair cells are unspecialised, innervated by both afferent and efferent nerve fibres, and respond only to low frequencies. Though the hearing organs are poorly developed and primitive with no visible external ears, they can still show a frequency response from 100 to 800 Hz, with peak sensitivity of 40 dB at 200 Hz.

==== Odorant receptors ====
Animals that depend on the sense of smell to capture prey, escape from predators or simply interact with the environment they inhabit, usually have many odorant receptors. These receptors are expressed in the dendritic membranes of the neurons for the detection of odours. The tuatara has around 472 receptors, a number more similar to what birds have than to the large number of receptors that turtles and crocodiles may have.

=== Spine and ribs ===
Between the atlas, first neck vertebra, and the skull is pair of triangular proatlas bones which serve to articulate the atlas and exoccipitals of the skull. While this feature was widespread in early tetrapods, it has been lost in squamates and all other terrestrial vertebrates other than crocodilians.

The tuatara spine is made up of hourglass-shaped amphicoelous vertebrae, concave both before and behind. This is the usual condition of fish vertebrae and some amphibians, but is unique to tuatara within living amniotes. The vertebral bodies have a tiny hole through which a constricted remnant of the notochord passes; this was typical in early fossil reptiles, but lost in most other amniotes.

The tuatara has gastralia, rib-like bones also called gastric or abdominal ribs, the presumed ancestral trait of diapsids. They are found in some lizards, where they are mostly made of cartilage, as well as crocodiles and the tuatara, and are not attached to the spine or thoracic ribs. The true ribs are small projections, with small, hooked bones, called uncinate processes, found on the rear of each rib. This feature is also present in birds. The tuatara is the only living tetrapod with well-developed gastralia and uncinate processes.

In the early tetrapods, the gastralia and ribs with uncinate processes, together with bony elements such as bony plates in the skin (osteoderms) and clavicles (collar bone), would have formed a sort of exoskeleton around the body, protecting the belly and helping to hold in the guts and inner organs. These anatomical details most likely evolved from structures involved in locomotion even before the vertebrates ventured onto land. The gastralia may have been involved in the breathing process in early amphibians and reptiles. The pelvis and shoulder girdles are arranged differently from those of lizards, as is the case with other parts of the internal anatomy and its scales.

=== Tail and back ===
The spiny plates on the back and tail of the tuatara resemble those of a crocodile more than a lizard, but the tuatara shares with lizards the ability to break off its tail when caught by a predator, and then regenerate it. The regrowth takes a long time and differs from that of lizards. Well illustrated reports on tail regeneration in tuatara have been published by Alibardi and Meyer-Rochow. The cloacal glands of tuatara have a unique organic compound named tuataric acid.

=== Age determination ===
Currently, there are two means of determining the age of tuatara. Using microscopic inspection, hematoxylinophilic rings can be identified and counted in both the phalanges and the femur. Phalangeal hematoxylinophilic rings can be used for tuatara up to ages 12–14 years, as they cease to form around this age. Femoral rings follow a similar trend, however they are useful for tuatara up to ages 25–35 years. Around that age, femoral rings cease to form. Further research on age determination methods for tuatara is required, as tuatara have lifespans much longer than 35 years (ages up to 60 are common, and captive tuatara have lived to over 100 years). One possibility could be via examination of tooth wear, as tuatara have fused sets of teeth.

=== Physiology ===
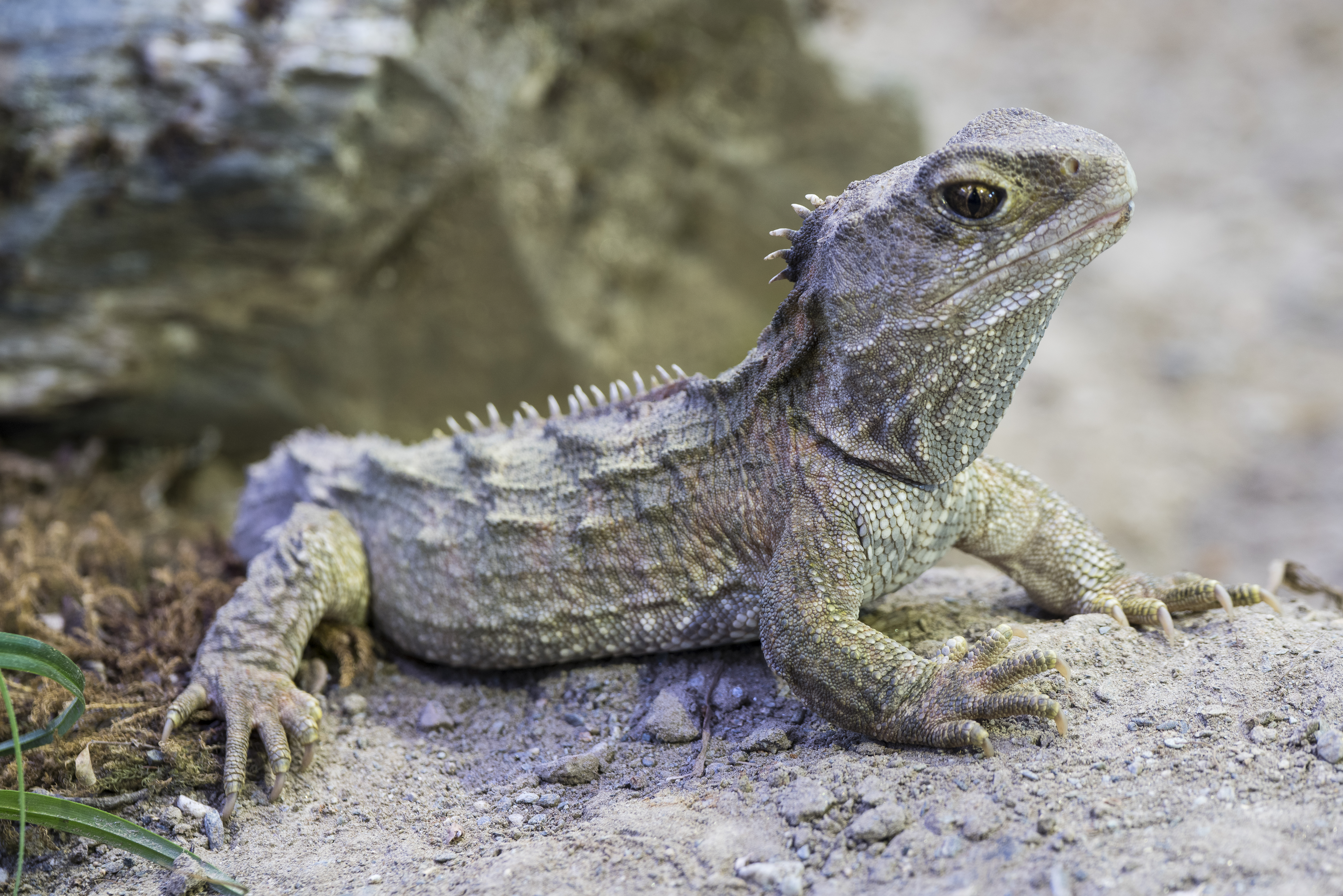
A tuatara basking at the West Coast Wildlife Centre, at Franz Josef on the West Coast

Adult tuatara are terrestrial and nocturnal reptiles, though they will often bask in the sun to warm their bodies. Hatchlings hide under logs and stones, and are diurnal, likely because adults are cannibalistic. Juveniles are typically active at night, but can be found active during the day. The juveniles' movement pattern is attributed to genetic hardwire of conspecifics for predator avoidance and thermal restrictions. Tuatara thrive in temperatures much lower than those tolerated by most reptiles, and hibernate during winter. They remain active at temperatures as low as 5 °C (41 °F), while temperatures over 28 °C (82 °F) are generally fatal. The optimal body temperature for the tuatara is from 16 to 21 °C (61 to 70 °F), the lowest of any reptile. The body temperature of tuatara is lower than that of other reptiles, ranging from 5.2–11.2 °C (41.4–52.2 °F) over a day, whereas most reptiles have body temperatures around 20 °C (68 °F). The low body temperature results in a slower metabolism.

== Ecology ==
Burrowing seabirds such as petrels, prions, and shearwaters share the tuatara's island habitat during the birds' nesting seasons. The tuatara use the birds' burrows for shelter when available, or dig their own. The seabirds' guano helps to maintain invertebrate populations on which tuatara predominantly prey, including beetles, crickets, spiders, wētās, earthworms, and snails. Their diets also consist of frogs, lizards, and bird's eggs and chicks. Young tuatara are also occasionally cannibalised. The diet of the tuatara varies seasonally, and they consume mainly fairy prions and their eggs in the summer. In total darkness no feeding attempt was observed, and the lowest light intensity at which an attempt to snatch a beetle was observed occurred under 0.0125 lux. The eggs and young of seabirds that are seasonally available as food for tuatara may provide beneficial fatty acids. Tuatara of both sexes defend territories, and will threaten and eventually bite intruders. The bite can cause serious injury. Tuatara will bite when approached, and will not let go easily. Female tuatara sometimes exhibit parental behaviour by guarding nests from other females.

Tuatara are parasitised by the tuatara tick (Archaeocroton sphenodonti), a tick that directly depends on tuatara. These ticks tend to be more prevalent on larger males, as they have larger home ranges than smaller and female tuatara and interact with other tuatara more in territorial displays.

== Reproduction ==
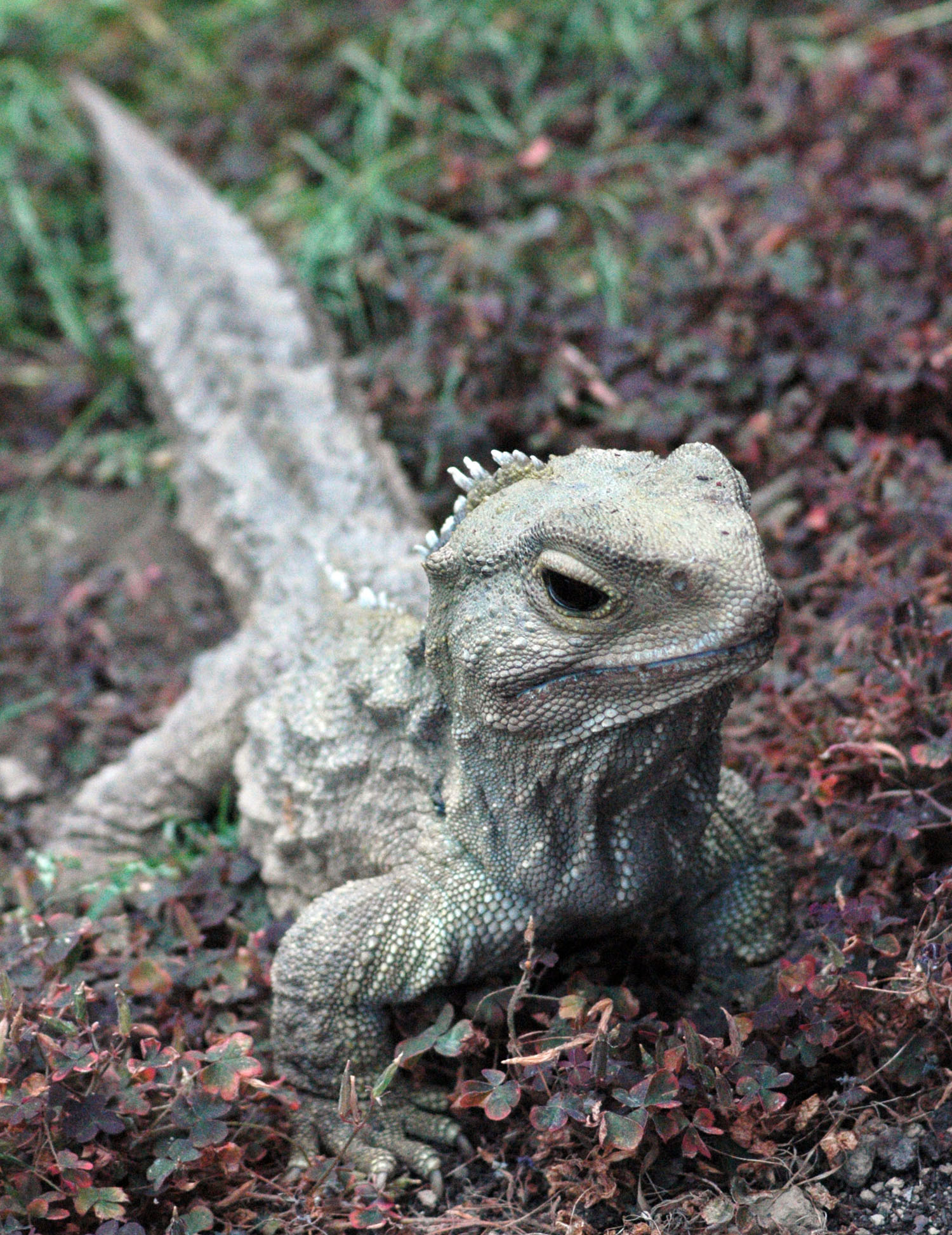
A male tuatara named Henry, living at the Southland Museum and Art Gallery, is still reproductively active at 111 years of age.

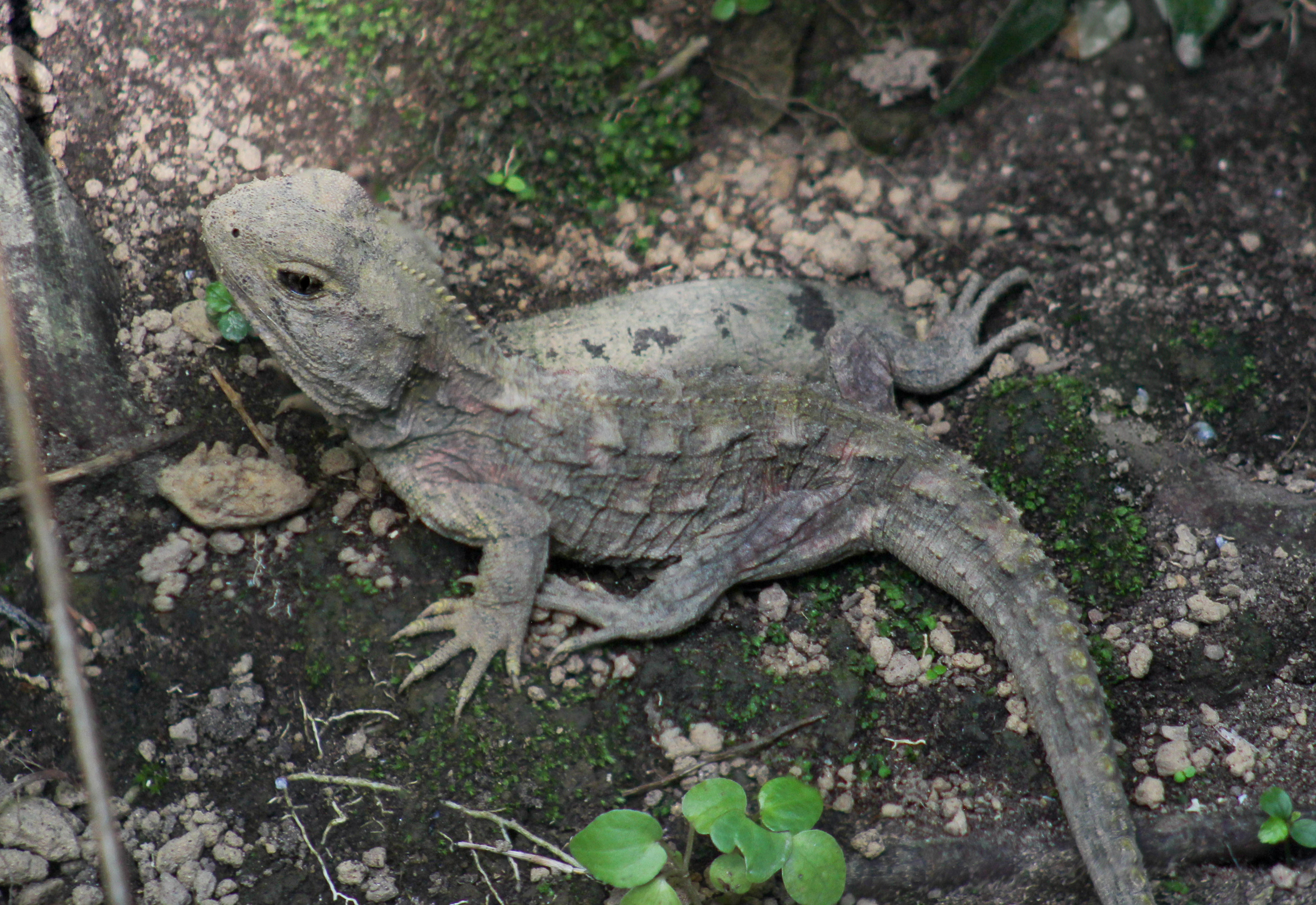
Juvenile tuatara at Zealandia wildlife sanctuary.

Tuatara reproduce very slowly, taking 10 to 20 years to reach sexual maturity. Though their reproduction rate is slow, tuatara have the fastest swimming sperm by two to four times compared to all reptiles studied earlier. Mating occurs in midsummer; females mate and lay eggs once every four years. During courtship, a male makes his skin darker, raises his crests, and parades toward the female. He slowly walks in circles around the female with stiffened legs. The female will either allow the male to mount her, or retreat to her burrow. Adult males do not have a penis or any form of intromittent phallus. They reproduce by the male lifting the tail of the female and placing his vent (cloaca) over hers. This process is sometimes referred to as a "cloacal kiss". The sperm is then transferred into the female, much like the mating process in birds. Along with birds, the tuatara is one of the few members of Amniota to have lost the ancestral penis.

Tuatara eggs have a soft, parchment-like 0.2mm thick shell that consists of calcite crystals embedded in a matrix of fibrous layers. It takes the females between one and three years to provide eggs with yolk, and up to seven months to form the shell. It then takes between 12 and 15 months from copulation to hatching. This means reproduction occurs at two- to five-year intervals, the slowest in any reptile.

Some females guard their eggs for up to 10 days. Rather than predators, the primary threat to unhatched offspring seems to be posed by unrelated female tuatara. While looking for a place to lay their own eggs, they can destroy a previous brood present in the nest. Eggs protected by their mother from rival females appear to have higher chance of survival.

Survival of embryos has also been linked to having more success in moist conditions. Wild tuatara are known to be still reproducing at about 60 years of age; "Henry", a male tuatara at Southland Museum in Invercargill, New Zealand, became a father (possibly for the first time) on 23 January 2009, at age 111, with an 80-year-old female.

The sex of a hatchling depends on the temperature of the egg, with warmer eggs tending to produce male tuatara, and cooler eggs producing females. Eggs incubated at 21 °C (70 °F) have an equal chance of being male or female. However, at 22 °C (72 °F), 80% are likely to be males, and at 20 °C (68 °F), 80% are likely to be females; at 18 °C (64 °F) all hatchlings will be females. Some evidence indicates sex determination in tuatara is determined by both genetic and environmental factors.

Tuatara probably have the slowest growth rates of any reptile, continuing to grow larger for the first 35 years of their lives. The average lifespan is about 60 years, but they can live to be well over 100 years old; tuatara could be the reptile with the second longest lifespan after tortoises. Some experts believe that captive tuatara could live as long as 200 years. This may be related to genes that offer protection against reactive oxygen species. The tuatara genome has 26 genes that encode selenoproteins and 4 selenocysteine-specific tRNA genes. In humans, selenoproteins have a function of antioxidation, redox regulation and synthesis of thyroid hormones. It is not fully demonstrated, but these genes may be related to the longevity of this animal or may have emerged as a result of the low levels of selenium and other trace elements in the New Zealand terrestrial systems.

== Genomic characteristics ==
The most abundant LINE element in the tuatara is L2 (10%). Most of them are interspersed and can remain active. The longest L2 element found is 4 kb long and 83% of the sequences had ORF2p completely intact. The CR1 element is the second most repeated (4%). Phylogenetic analysis shows that these sequences are very different from those found in other nearby species such as lizards. Finally, less than 1% are elements belonging to L1, a low percentage since these elements tend to predominate in placental mammals. Usually, the predominant LINE elements are the CR1, contrary to what has been seen in the tuatara. This suggests that perhaps the genome repeats of sauropsids were very different compared to mammals, birds and lizards.

The genes of the major histocompatibility complex (MHC) are known to play roles in disease resistance, mate choice, and kin recognition in various vertebrate species. Among known vertebrate genomes, MHCs are considered one of the most polymorphic. In the tuatara, 56 MHC genes have been identified; some of which are similar to MHCs of amphibians and mammals. Most MHCs that were annotated in the tuatara genome are highly conserved, however there is large genomic rearrangement observed in distant lepidosaur lineages.

Many of the elements that have been analyzed are present in all amniotes, most are mammalian interspersed repeats or MIR, specifically the diversity of MIR subfamilies is the highest that has been studied so far in an amniote. Sixteen families of SINEs that were recently active have also been identified.

The tuatara has 24 unique families of DNA transposons, and at least 30 subfamilies were recently active. This diversity is greater than what has been found in other amniotes and in addition, thousands of identical copies of these transposons have been analyzed, suggesting to researchers that there is recent activity.

The genome is the second largest known to reptiles. Only the Greek tortoise genome is larger. Around 7,500 LTRs have been identified, including 450 endogenous retroviruses (ERVs). Studies in other Sauropsida have recognised a similar number but nevertheless, in the genome of the tuatara it has been found a very old clade of retrovirus known as Spumavirus.

More than 8,000 non-coding RNA-related elements have been identified in the tuatara genome, of which the vast majority, about 6,900, are derived from recently active transposable elements. The rest are related to ribosomal, spliceosomal and signal recognition particle RNA.

The mitochondrial genome of the genus Sphenodon is approximately 18,000 bp in size and consists of 13 protein-coding genes, 2 ribosomal RNA and 22 transfer RNA genes.

DNA methylation is a very common modification in animals and the distribution of CpG sites within genomes affects this methylation. Specifically, 81% of these CpG sites have been found to be methylated in the tuatara genome. Recent publications propose that this high level of methylation may be due to the amount of repeating elements that exist in the genome of this animal. This pattern is closer to what occurs in organisms such as zebrafish, about 78%, while in humans it is only 70%.

The species has between five and six billion base pairs of DNA sequence, nearly twice that of humans.

== Conservation ==
Tuatara are absolutely protected under New Zealand's Wildlife Act 1953. The species is also listed under Appendix I of the Convention on International Trade in Endangered Species (CITES) meaning commercial international trade in wild sourced specimens is prohibited and all other international trade (including in parts and derivatives) is regulated by the CITES permit system.

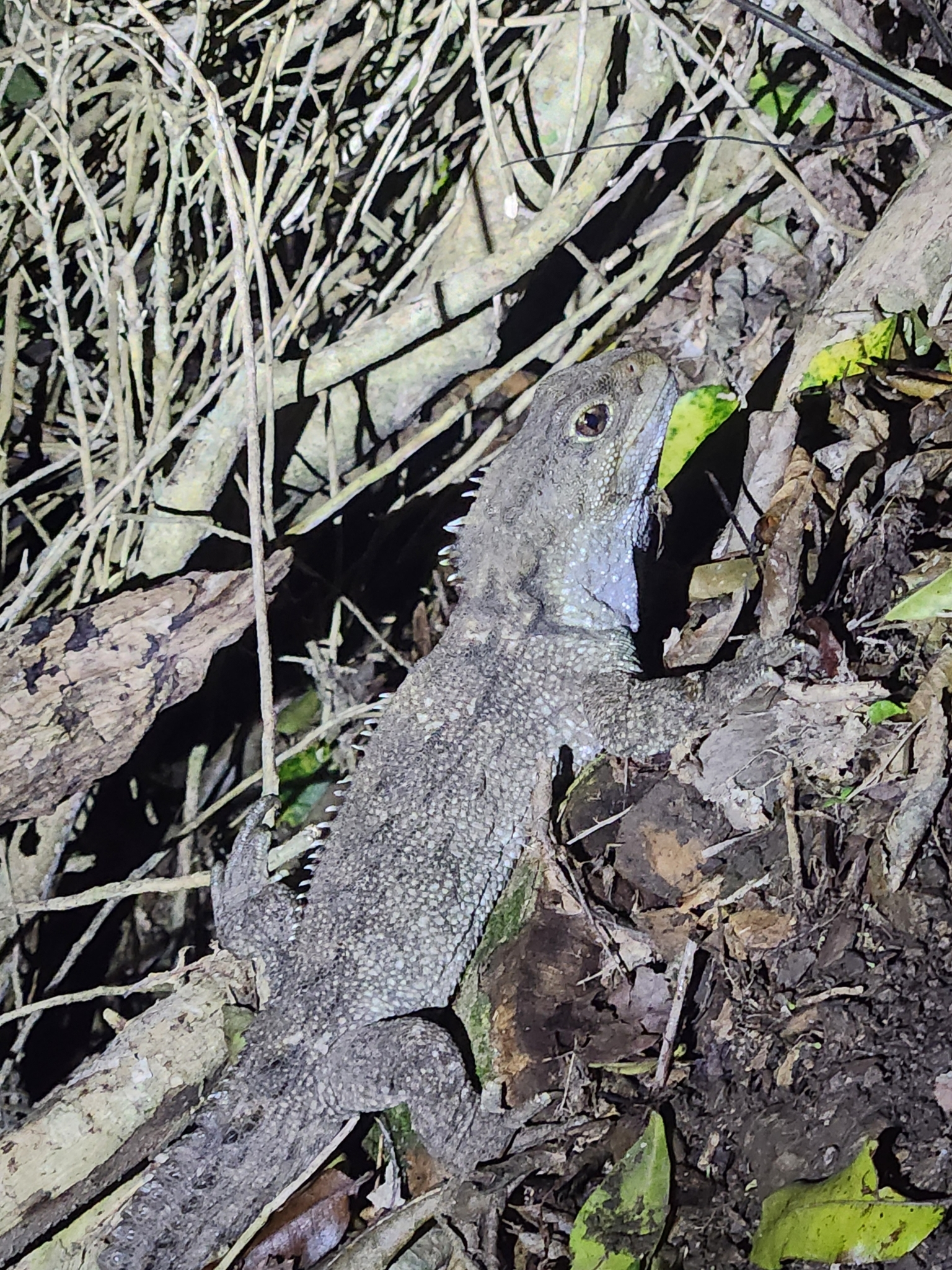
Tuatara sighted on the South Island mainland, in November 2024

=== Distribution and threats ===
Tuatara were once widespread on New Zealand's main North and South Islands, where subfossil remains have been found in sand dunes, caves, and Māori middens. Wiped out from the main islands before European settlement, they were long confined to 32 offshore islands free of mammals. The islands are difficult to get to, and are colonised by few animal species, indicating that some animals absent from these islands may have caused tuatara to disappear from the mainland. However, kiore (Polynesian rats) had recently become established on several of the islands, and tuatara were persisting, but not breeding, on these islands. Additionally, tuatara were much rarer on the rat-inhabited islands. Prior to conservation work, 25% of the distinct tuatara populations had become extinct in the past century.

Between 1995 and 2020, conservation translocations (including reintroductions and reinforcements) occurred to 14 islands and to 5 mainland sanctuaries. The discovery of tuatara hatching on the mainland indicates that attempts to re-establish a breeding population on the New Zealand mainland have had some success. Further conservation translocations have occurred, including in 2025.

The total population of tuatara is estimated to be between 60,000 and 100,000.

==== Climate change ====
Tuatara have temperature-dependent sex determination meaning that the temperature of the egg determines the sex of the animal. For tuatara, lower egg incubation temperatures lead to females while higher temperatures lead to males. Since global temperatures are increasing, climate change may be skewing the male to female ratio of tuatara. Current solutions to this potential future threat are the selective removal of adults and the incubation of eggs.

=== Eradication of rats ===
Tuatara were removed from Stanley, Red Mercury and Cuvier Islands in 1990 and 1991, and maintained in captivity to allow Polynesian rats to be eradicated on those islands. All three populations bred in captivity, and after successful eradication of the rats, all individuals, including the new juveniles, were returned to their islands of origin. In the 1991–92 season, Little Barrier Island was found to hold only eight tuatara, which were taken into in situ captivity, where females produced 42 eggs, which were incubated at Victoria University. The resulting offspring were subsequently held in an enclosure on the island, then released into the wild in 2006 after rats were eradicated there.

In the Hen and Chicken Islands, Polynesian rats were eradicated on Whatupuke in 1993, Lady Alice Island in 1994, and Coppermine Island in 1997. Following this program, juveniles have once again been seen on the latter three islands. In contrast, rats persist on Hen Island of the same group, and no juvenile tuatara have been seen there as of 2001. In the Alderman Islands, Middle Chain Island holds no tuatara, but it is considered possible for rats to swim between Middle Chain and other islands that do hold tuatara, and the rats were eradicated in 1992 to prevent this. Another rodent eradication was carried out on the Rangitoto Islands east of D'Urville Island, to prepare for the release of 432 Cook Strait tuatara juveniles in 2004, which were being raised at Victoria University as of 2001.

==== Brothers Island tuatara ====
Sphenodon punctatus guntheri is present naturally on one small island with a population of approximately 400. In 1995, 50 juvenile and 18 adult Brothers Island tuatara were moved to Titi Island in Cook Strait, and their establishment monitored. Two years later, more than half of the animals had been seen again and of those all but one had gained weight. In 1998, 34 juveniles from captive breeding and 20 wild-caught adults were similarly transferred to Matiu/Somes Island, a more publicly accessible location in Wellington Harbour. The captive juveniles were from induced layings from wild females.

In late October 2007, 50 tuatara collected as eggs from North Brother Island and hatched at Victoria University were being released onto Long Island in the outer Marlborough Sounds. The animals had been cared for at Wellington Zoo for the previous five years and had been kept in secret in a specially built enclosure at the zoo, off display.

There is another out of country population of Brothers Island tuatara that was given to the San Diego Zoological Society and is housed off-display at the San Diego Zoo facility in Balboa. No successful reproductive efforts have been reported yet.

==== Northern tuatara ====
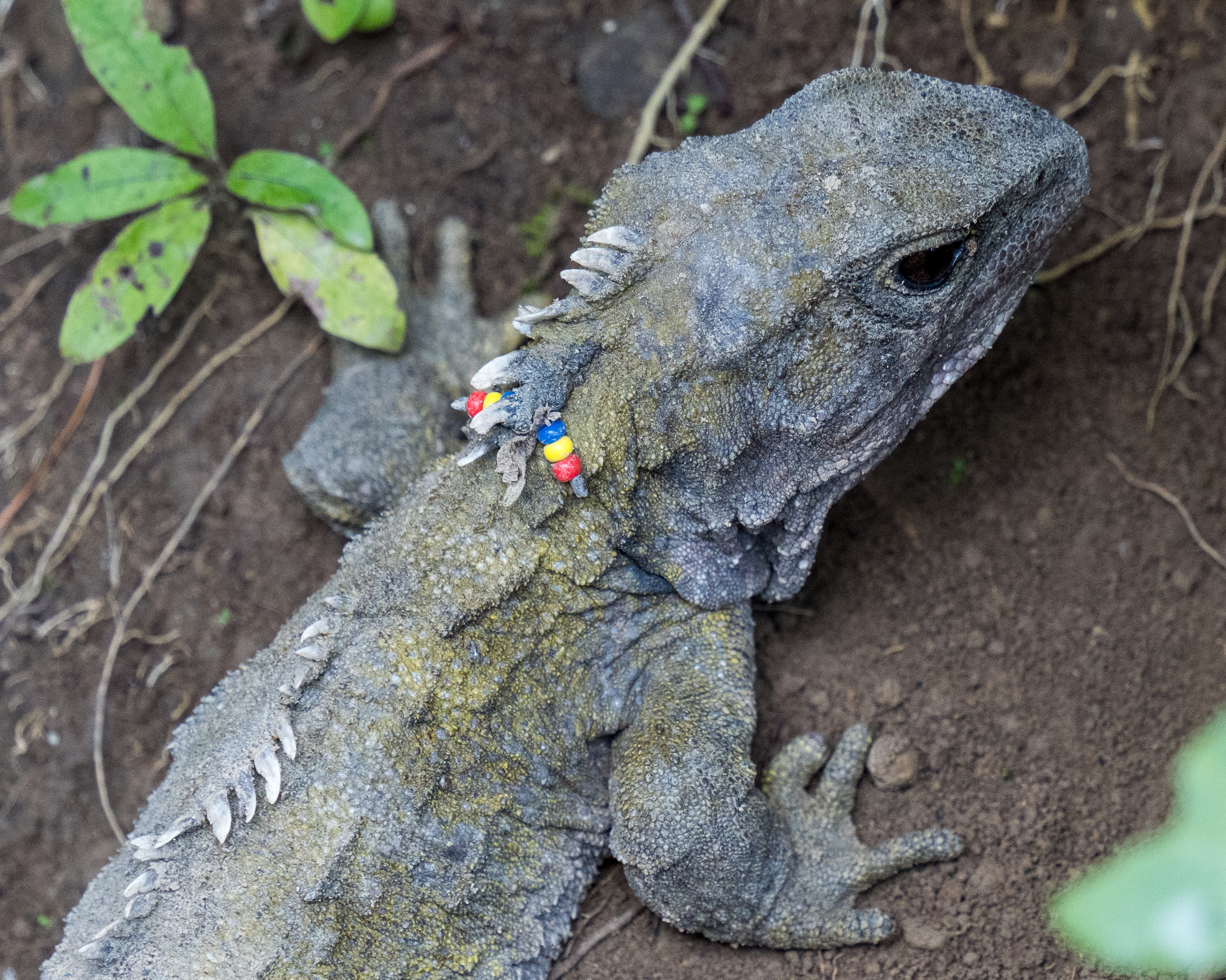
Tuatara at Zealandia are given coloured beads on their heads for identification.

S. punctatus punctatus naturally occurs on 29 islands, and its population is estimated to be over 60,000 individuals. In 1996, 32 adult northern tuatara were moved from Moutoki Island to Moutohora. The carrying capacity of Moutohora is estimated at 8,500 individuals, and the island could allow public viewing of wild tuatara. In 2003, 60 northern tuatara were introduced to Tiritiri Matangi Island from Middle Island in the Mercury group. They are occasionally seen sunbathing by visitors to the island.

A mainland release of S. p. punctatus occurred in 2005 in the heavily fenced and monitored Zealandia sanctuary. The second mainland release took place in October 2007, when a further 130 were transferred from Stephens Island to Zealandia. In early 2009, the first recorded wild-born offspring were observed.

=== Captive breeding ===
The first successful breeding of tuatara in captivity is believed to have achieved by Sir Algernon Thomas at either his University offices or residence in Symonds Street in the late 1880s or his new home, Trewithiel, in Mount Eden in the early 1890s.

Several tuatara breeding programmes are active in New Zealand. Southland Museum and Art Gallery in Invercargill was the first institution to have a tuatara breeding programme; starting in 1986 they bred S. punctatus and have focused on S. guntheri more recently.

Hamilton Zoo, Auckland Zoo and Wellington Zoo also breed tuatara for release into the wild. At Auckland Zoo in the 1990s it was discovered that tuatara have temperature-dependent sex determination. The Victoria University of Wellington maintains a research programme into the captive breeding of tuatara, and the Pūkaha / Mount Bruce National Wildlife Centre keeps a pair and a juvenile.

The WildNZ Trust has a tuatara breeding enclosure at Ruawai. One notable captive breeding success story took place in January 2009, when all 11 eggs belonging to 110-year-old tuatara Henry and 80-year-old tuatara Mildred hatched. This story is especially remarkable as Henry required surgery to remove a cancerous tumour in order to successfully breed.

In January 2016, Chester Zoo, England, announced that they succeeded in breeding the tuatara in captivity for the first time outside its homeland.

== Cultural significance ==
Tuatara feature in a number of indigenous legends, and are held as ariki (God forms). Tuatara are regarded as the messengers of Whiro, the god of death and disaster, and Māori women are forbidden to eat them. Tuatara also indicate tapu (the borders of what is sacred and restricted), beyond which there is mana, meaning there could be serious consequences if that boundary is crossed. Māori women would sometimes tattoo images of lizards, some of which may represent tuatara, near their genitals. Today, tuatara are regarded as a taonga (special treasure) along with being viewed as the kaitiaki (guardian) of knowledge.

The tuatara was featured on one side of the New Zealand five-cent coin, which was phased out in October 2006. Tuatara was also the name of the Journal of the Biological Society of Victoria University College and subsequently Victoria University of Wellington, published from 1947 until 1993. It has now been digitised by the New Zealand Electronic Text Centre, also at Victoria.

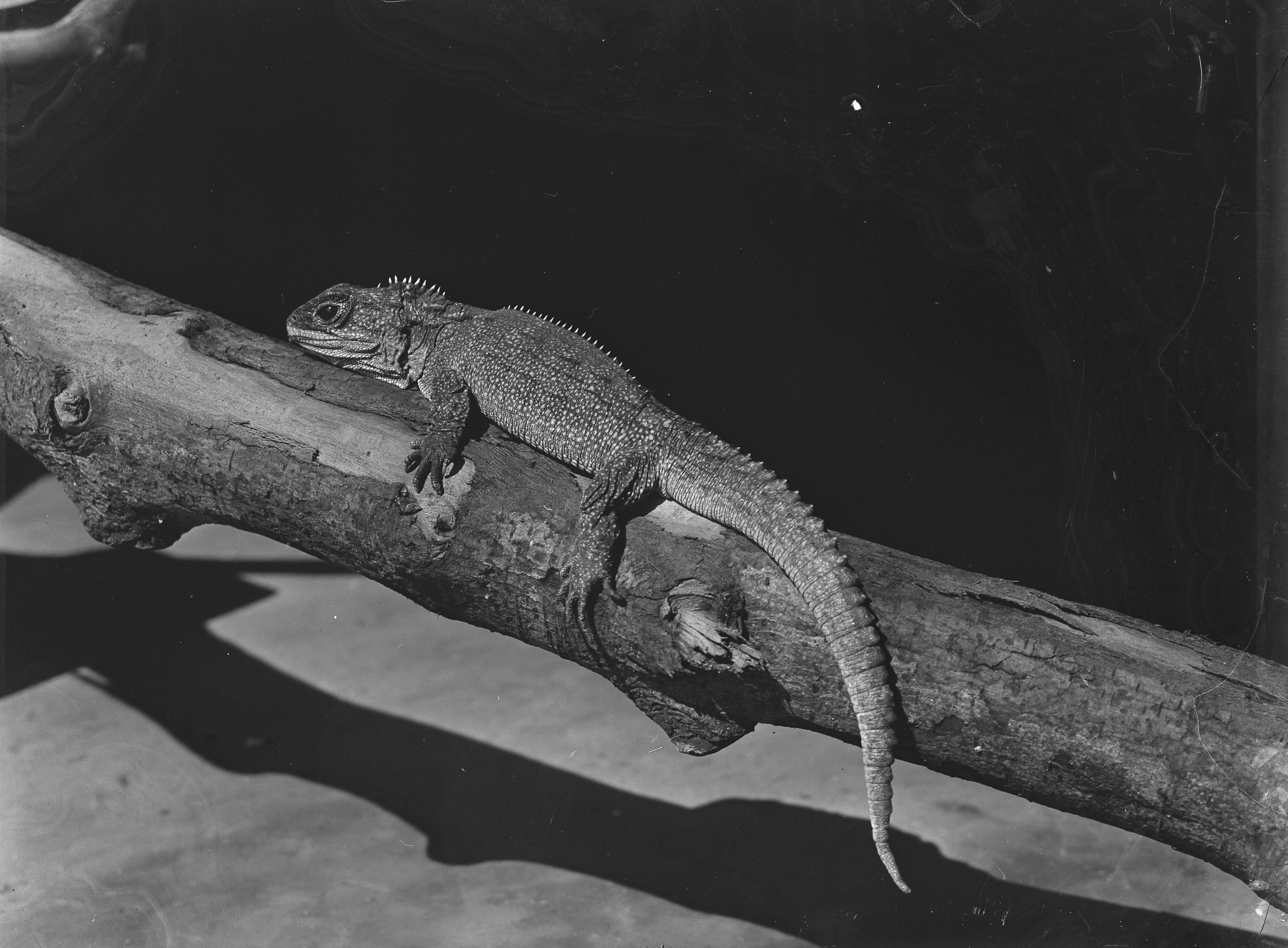
Photograph taken for Life magazine by Arthur Breckon, 1937
