= Tuataric acid =

Names
- Preferred IUPAC name (4E,6Z)-Octa-4,6-dienoic acid

Identifiers
CAS Number	1147102-65-5
3D model (JSmol)	Interactive image
ChemSpider	(4E,6E): 4519120
PubChem CID	28766189
CompTox Dashboard (EPA)	DTXSID801046815
- InChI: InChI=1S/C8H12O2/c1-2-3-4-5-6-7-8(9)10/h2-5H,6-7H2,1H3,(H,9,10)/b3-2-,5-4+ Key: GVKGXDFZFAFBIW-AWYLAFAOSA-N
- SMILES: C/C=C\C=C\CCC(=O)O

Properties
Chemical formula	C_{8}H_{12}O_{2}
Molar mass	140.182 g·mol^{−1}
Appearance	Colorless Solid
- Except where otherwise noted, data are given for materials in their standard state (at 25 °C [77 °F], 100 kPa). verify (what is ?) Infobox references

Tuataric acid is an organic compound and an unsaturated carboxylic acid. This colourless compound was isolated in 2009 from the cloacal glands of the tuatara, a lizard-like reptile native to New Zealand. Its formal name is (4E,6Z)-octa-4,6-dienoic acid, and it consists of an unusual pair of conjugated alkene units with the E and Z configurations.

Tuataric acid can be prepared from pent-4-yn-1-ol through a sequence that begins with the extension of the alkyne terminus by hydroboration and ends with the oxidation of the alcohol.
