= History of cross-dressing =

Cross-dressing, the act of wearing the clothes of the sex or gender one does not identify with, has been recorded throughout history.

== Background ==
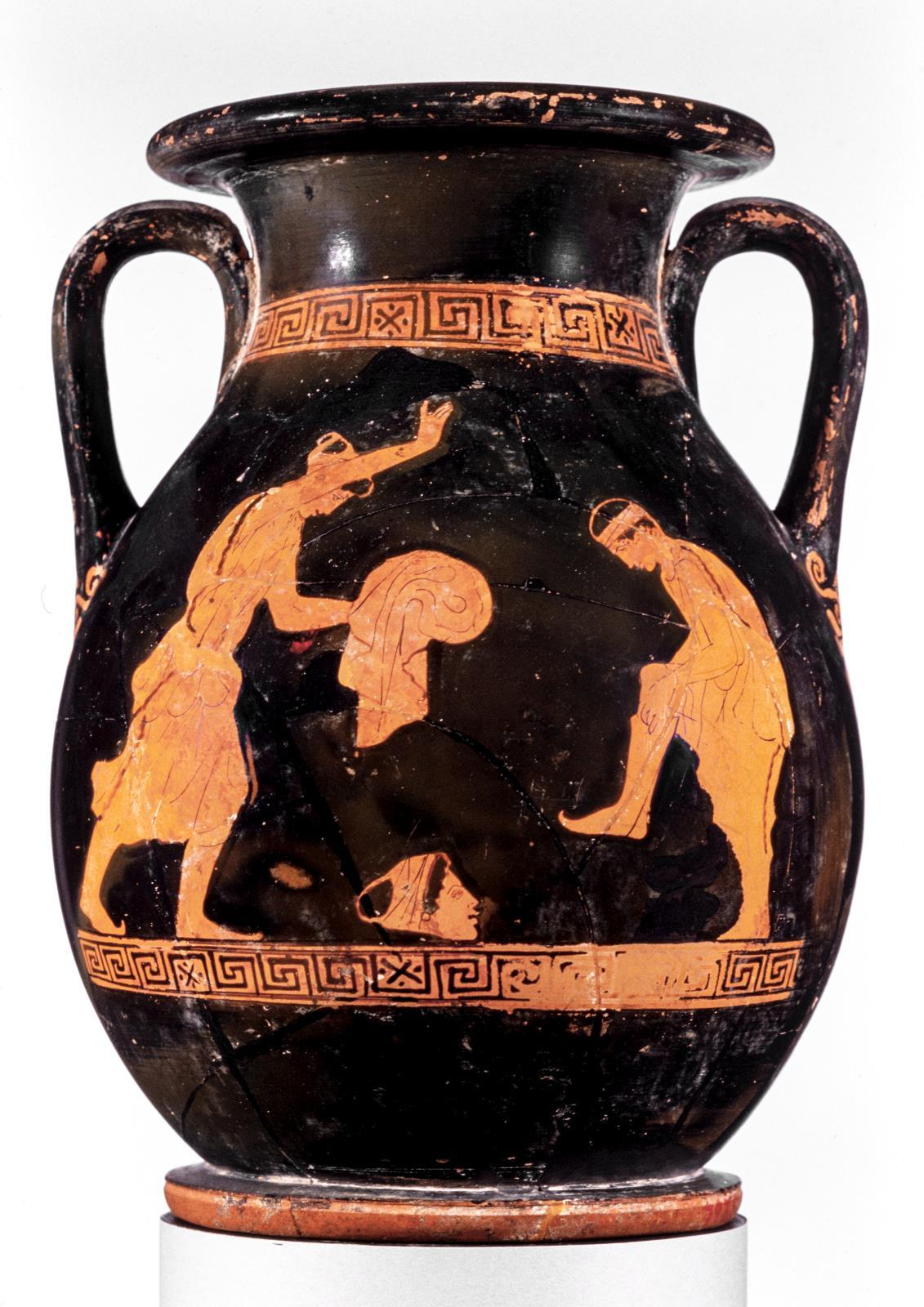
Male performers putting on female costumes prior to a theatre performance. The figure on the left is wearing a mask and a second mask is lying on the ground between them. The masks represent a female character and they have a kerchief around the hair on the mask. Their costumes also include female clothing such as high boots and a chiton. Ceramic Athenian Pelike. Phiale Painter. Ancient Greek. Around 430 BCE. Museum of Fine Arts, Boston

Patriarchy is a social system in which men hold the primary power over women and their families in regards to the tradition, law, division of labor, and education women can take part in. Women used cross-dressing to pass as men in order to live adventurous lives outside of the home, which were unlikely to occur while living as women. Women who engaged in cross-dressing in earlier centuries were lower-class women who would gain access to economic independence as well as freedom to travel, without much risk of losing what they had. The practice of women dressing as men was generally viewed more positively as compared to men dressing as women. Altenburger states that female-to-male cross-dressing entailed a movement forward in terms of social status, power, and freedom whereas men who cross-dressed were ridiculed or otherwise viewed negatively. Some people also alleged that men would cross-dress to gain access around women for their own sexual desire. The LGBTQ community would use cross dressing as a means of "being able to find acceptance within the dominant culture." This idea was raised during the late 1900s, but throughout history, including early Christianity, there are accounts of saints cross-dressing as a means of protection, expression and necessity to stand in line in the social order. They take on a name that would accurately represent who they identified as and how they wanted to stand in the social order.

=== In Christian history and religion ===
Kristi Upson-Saia discusses how the early church reacted and dealt with the accusations and proof of saints cross-dressing. According to Upson-Saia, the church's response to these incidents varied depending on the social and political backdrop of the period. In other cases, the church used the saints' cross-dressing to promote traditional gender standards and its own authority over problems of gender and sexuality. In other situations, the church may have accepted the saints' cross-dressing as proof of their spiritual purity and dedication. Upson-Saia also observes that the church's stance to cross-dressing was not always uniform across time and region. Some cross-dressing saints, for example, were honored in some parts of the world but reviled in others. Furthermore, the church's reaction to cross-dressing may have been impacted by other factors such as the saint's social rank, their role in the church, and the political context of the time.

Tertullian, a Christian theologian, shames women who would refuse to wear their veil in public, which is an example of cross-dressing and bending the gender norms during early Christianity. Tertullian contends that women who dress like males commit a sin because they violate God's natural order. He claims that God designed men and women to be unique and diverse, and that cross-dressing blurs these boundaries and distorts gender roles. He also claims that when women dress like males, they are "degrading themselves" and "diminishing their own femininity." He writes that when a woman dresses like a man, they are "laying aside the ornaments of their own sex, to assume those of the other." He says, when women do this, they decide on "changing their condition and deserting what is peculiar to themselves." According to Tertullian, this leads to "depravity of morals."

It was once considered taboo in Western society for women to wear clothing traditionally associated with men, except when done in certain circumstances such as cases of necessity (as per St. Thomas Aquinas's guidelines in Summa Theologiae II), which states: "Nevertheless, this may be done sometimes without sin on account of some necessity, either in order to hide oneself from enemies, or through lack of other clothes, or for some similar motive." Cross-dressing is cited as an abomination in the Bible in the book of Deuteronomy (22:5), which states: "A woman must not wear men's clothing, nor a man wear women's clothing, for the Lord your God detests anyone who does this", but as Aquinas noted above this principle was interpreted to be based on context. Other people in the Middle Ages occasionally disputed its applicability; for instance, the 15th-century French poet Martin le Franc.

=== Historical figures ===
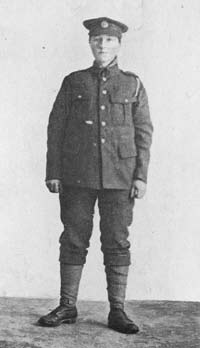
First World War photograph of English war reporter Dorothy Lawrence who secretly posed as a man to become a soldier.

Historical figures have cross-dressed for various reasons across the centuries. For example, women have dressed as men in order to go to war, and men have dressed as women in order to avoid going to war. Many people have engaged in cross-dressing during wartime under various circumstances and for various motives. This has been especially true of women, whether while serving as a soldier in otherwise all-male armies, while protecting themselves or disguising their identity in dangerous circumstances, or for other purposes. Conversely, men would dress as women to avoid being drafted, the mythological precedent for this being Achilles hiding at the court of Lycomedes dressed as a girl to avoid participation in the Trojan War.

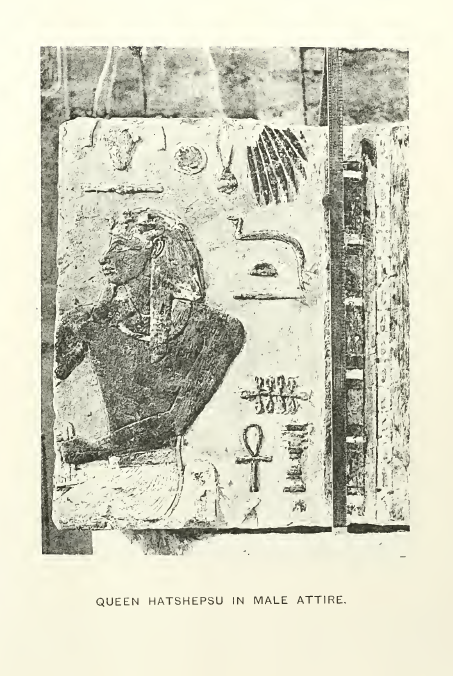

- Several tales of the Desert Fathers speak of monks who were disguised women, and being discovered only when their bodies were prepared for burial. One such woman, Marina the Monk, died 508, accompanied her father to a monastery and adopted a monk's habit as a disguise. When falsely accused of getting a woman pregnant, she patiently bore the accusation rather than revealing her identity to clear her name, an action praised in medieval books of saints' lives as an example of humble forbearance.
- In monarchies where the throne was inherited by male offspring, male descendants of deposed rulers were sometimes dressed as female so that they would be allowed to live. One example was the son of Korean Princess Gyeonghye, herself the daughter of a former king, who was dressed in female clothes in his early years to fool his great uncle into thinking he was not a male descendant of Munjong.
- The legend of Pope Joan alleges that she was a promiscuous female pope who dressed like a man and reigned from 855 to 858. Modern historians regard her as a mythical figure who originated from 13th-century anti-papal satire.

== In mythology ==
=== Greek ===
- In punishment for his murder of Iphitus, Heracles/Hercules was given to Omphale as a slave. Many variants of this story say that she not only compelled him to do women's work, but compelled him to dress as a woman while her slave.
- In Achilles on Skyros, Achilles was dressed in women's clothing by his mother Thetis at the court of Lycomedes, to hide him from Odysseus who wanted him to join the Trojan War.
- Athena often goes to the aid of people in the guise of men in The Odyssey.
- Tiresias was turned into a woman after angering the goddess Hera by killing a female snake that was coupling.
- In the cult of Aphroditus, worshipers cross-dressed, men wore women's clothing and women dressed in men's clothing with false beards.

=== Norse ===
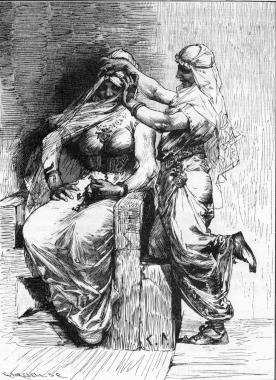
Thor and Loki disguised as women

- Thor dressed as Freyja to get Mjölnir back in Þrymskviða.
- Odin dressed as a female healer as part of his efforts to seduce Rindr.
- Hagbard in the legend of Hagbard and Signy (the Romeo and Juliet of the Vikings).
- Frotho I dressed as a shieldmaiden in one of his eastern campaigns.
- Hervor from the Hervarar saga. When Hervor learnt that her father had been the infamous Swedish berserker Angantyr, she dressed as a man, called herself Hjörvard and lived for a long time as a Viking.

=== Hindu ===
- The Mahabharata: In the Agnyatbaas ("exile") period of one year imposed upon the Pandavas, in which they had to keep their identities secret to avoid detection, Arjuna cross-dressed as Brihannala and became a dance teacher.
- The goddess Bahuchara Mata: In one legend, Bapiya was cursed by her and he became impotent. The curse was lifted only when he worshiped her by dressing and acting like a woman.
- Devotees of the god Krishna: Some male devotees of the god Krishna, specifically a sect called the sakhi bekhi, dress in female attire as an act of devotion. Krishna and his consort Radha had cross-dressed in each other's clothing. Krishna is also said to have dressed as a gopi and a kinnari goddess.

== In folklore ==
Ballads have many cross-dressing heroines. While some (The Famous Flower of Serving-Men) merely need to move about freely, many do it specifically in pursuit of a lover (Rose Red and the White Lily or Child Waters) and consequently pregnancy often complicates the disguise. In the Chinese poem the Ballad of Mulan, Hua Mulan disguised herself as a man to take her elderly father's place in the army.

Occasionally, men in ballads also disguise themselves as women, but not only is it rarer, the men dress so for less time, because they are merely trying to elude an enemy by the disguise, as in Brown Robin, The Duke of Athole's Nurse, or Robin Hood and the Bishop. According to Gude Wallace, William Wallace disguised himself as a woman to escape capture, which may have been based on historical information.

Fairy tales seldom feature cross-dressing, but an occasional heroine needs to move freely as a man, as in the German The Twelve Huntsmen, the Scottish The Tale of the Hoodie, or the Russian The Lute Player. Madame d'Aulnoy included such a woman in her literary fairy tale, Belle-Belle ou Le Chevalier Fortuné.

== In festivals ==
In the cities Techiman and Wenchi (both Ghana) men dress as women – and vice versa – during the annual Apoo festival (April/May).

== In literature ==
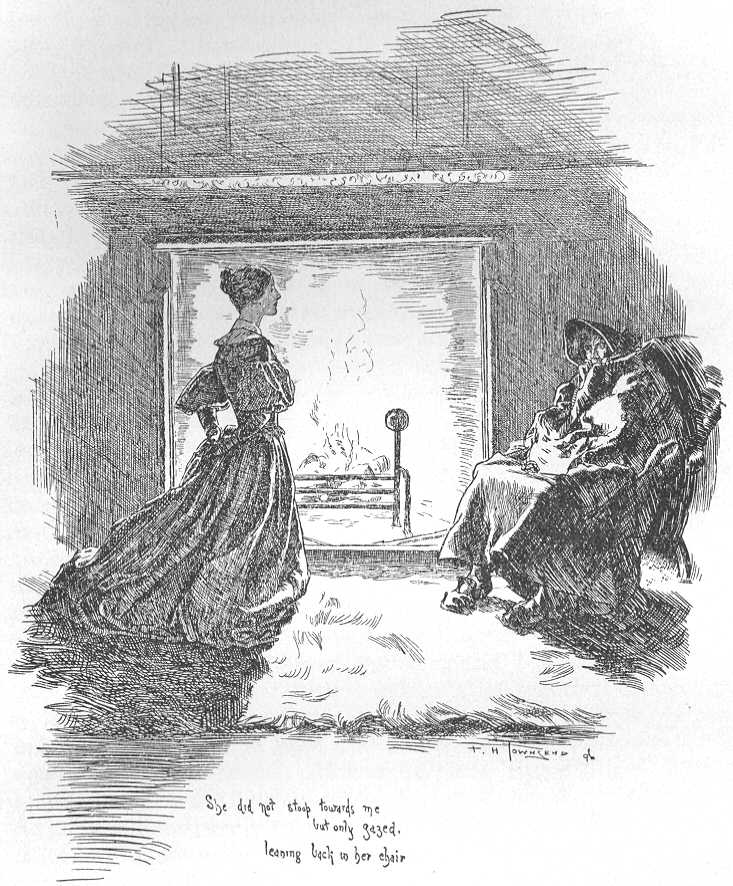
Mr. Rochester disguised as a Gypsy woman sitting at the fireplace. Illustration by F. H. Townsend in the second edition of Charlotte Brontë's 1847 novel Jane Eyre.

Cross-dressing as a literary motif is well attested in older literature but is becoming increasingly popular in modern literature as well. It is often associated with character nonconformity and sexuality rather than gender identity.

== On stage and on the screen ==
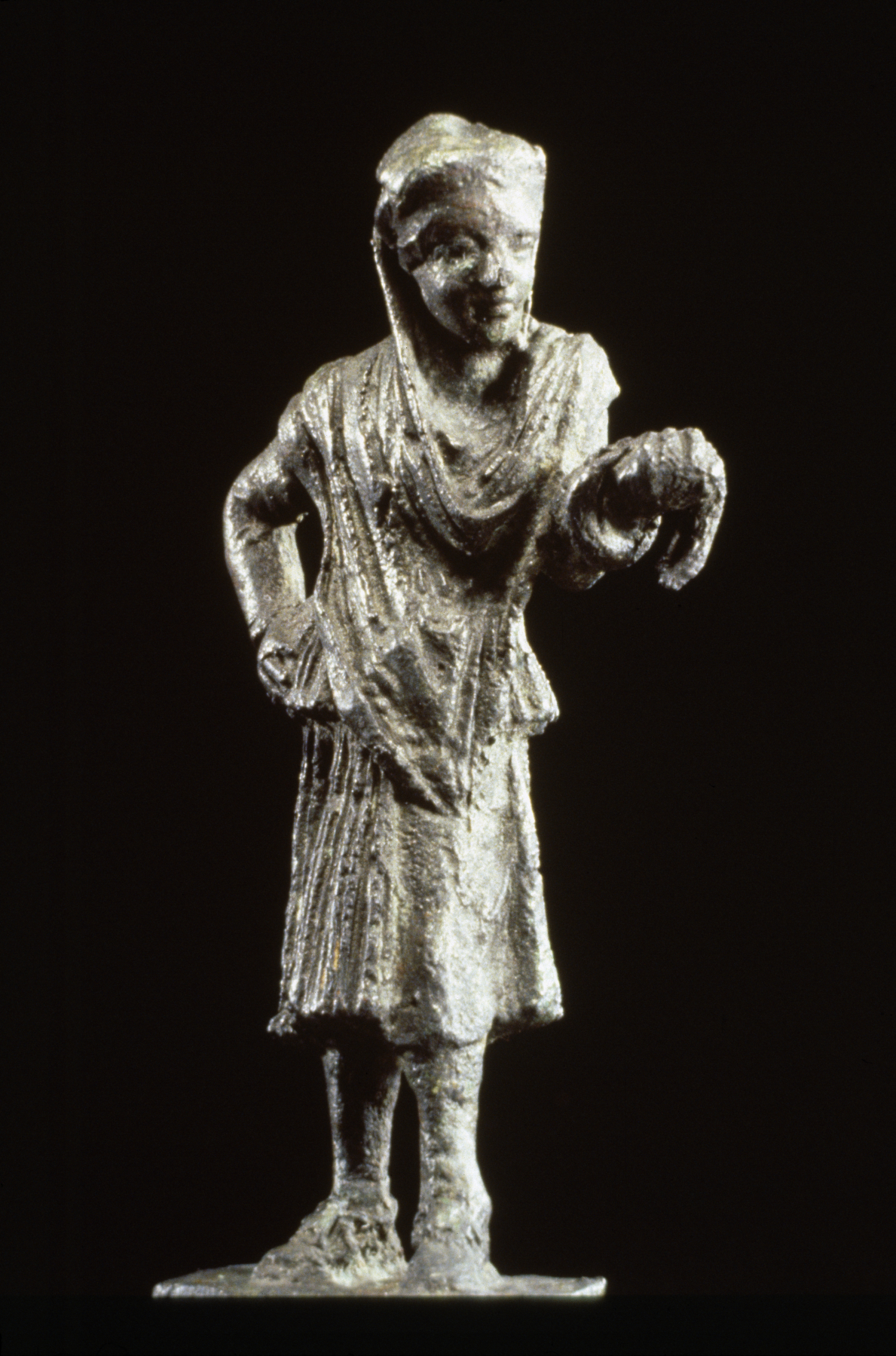
Bronze statue of a Greek actor. He wears a man's conical cap but female garments, following the Greek custom of men playing the roles of women. 150-100 BCE.

Many societies prohibited women from performing on stage, so boys and men took the female roles. In the ancient Greek theatre men played females, as they did in English Renaissance theatre and continue to do in Japanese kabuki theatre (see onnagata). Chinese opera was traditionally all-male, which led to the ride of female-led yue or Shaoxing opera.

Cross-dressing in motion pictures began in the early days of the silent films. Charlie Chaplin and Stan Laurel brought the tradition of female impersonation in the English music halls when they came to America with Fred Karno's comedy troupe in 1910. Both Chaplin and Laurel occasionally dressed as women in their films. Even the beefy American actor Wallace Beery appeared in a series of silent films as a Swedish woman. The Three Stooges, especially Curly (Jerry Howard), sometimes appeared in drag in their short films. The tradition has continued for many years, usually played for laughs. Only in recent decades have there been dramatic films in which cross-dressing was included, possibly because of strict censorship of American films until the mid-1960s.

Cross-gender acting, on the other hand, refers to actors or actresses portraying a character of the opposite gender.

== By country ==
=== Spain and Latin America ===
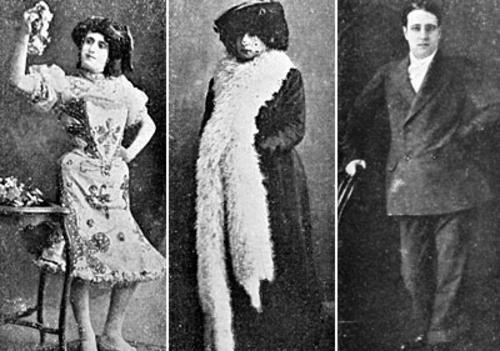
Luis Fernández aka "La Princesa de Borbón", a well-known Spanish-born crossdresser in the gay scene of Buenos Aires in the early 20th century.

Catalina de Erauso (1592–1650), known as la monja alférez "the Nun Lieutenant", was a Spanish woman who, after being sent to a convent at the age of 4, escaped from it disguised as a man, fled to America and enrolled herself in the Spanish army under the false name of Alonso Díaz Ramírez de Guzmán. She served under several captains, including her own brother, and was never discovered. She was said to behave as an extremely cruel soldier, although she had a successful career, reaching the rank of alférez (lieutenant) and becoming quite well known in the Americas. After a fight in which she killed a man, she was severely injured, and fearing her end, she confessed her true sex to a bishop. She nonetheless survived, and there was a huge scandal afterwards, especially since as a man she had become quite famous in the Americas, and because nobody had ever suspected anything about her true sex. Nevertheless, thanks to the scandal and her fame as a brave soldier, she became a celebrity. She went back to Spain, and was even granted a special dispensation by the pope to wear men's clothes. She started using the male name of Antonio de Erauso, and went back to the America, where she established a business as a muleteer between Mexico City and Veracruz.

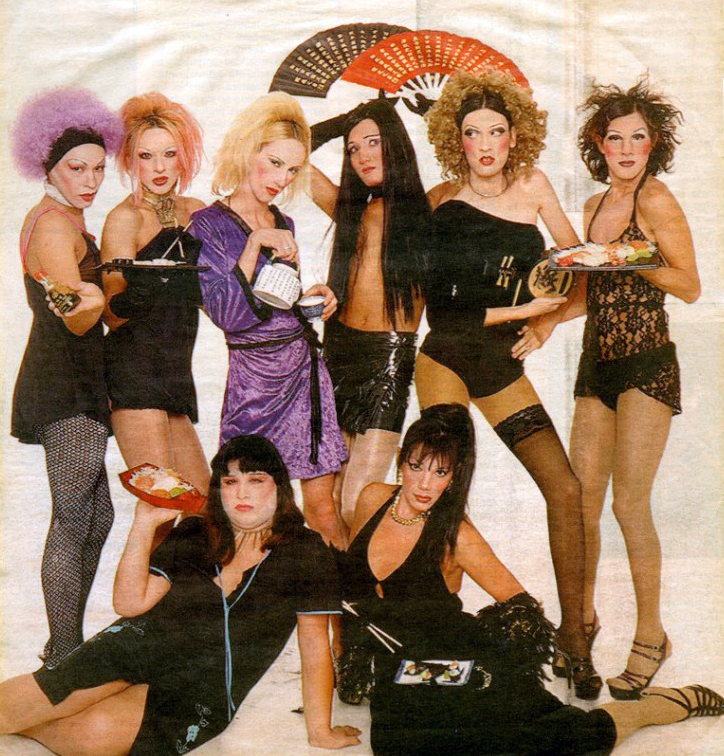
Drag queens from Argentina in 1995. In the 1990s, drag queens became a fixture in the flourishing gay nightlife of Buenos Aires.

There was a complex and visible culture of homosexuals and cross-dressers that extended in all the social classes of Buenos Aires during the late 19th and early 20th centuries. One of the first historical records of gay life in Buenos Aires were the criminal careers of several crossdressing swindlers, who were profiled by hygienists. A 1912 article published by Fray Mocho reported that this gang of crossdressing criminals made up of about three thousand men, which represented about 0.5 percent of the male population of Buenos Aires at that time. According to several testimonies, clandestine cross dressing balls were very popular among middle and upper class gay men in Buenos in the early-to-mid 20th century.

In several Latin American countries, the local term for "cross-dresser" (travesti) was established over the years as a term to designate people who were assigned male at birth, but develop a gender identity according to different expressions of femininity; as the Western notions of "transgender" and "transsexual" had not yet been introduced to the region. Although of pejorative origin, many people continue to claim the travesti term as a gender identity that escapes the male-female binary.

=== Europe ===
Stories about cross-dressing women appear often in European folklore.

Ulrika Eleonora Stålhammar was a Swedish woman who served as a soldier during the Great Northern War and married a woman.

=== United States ===
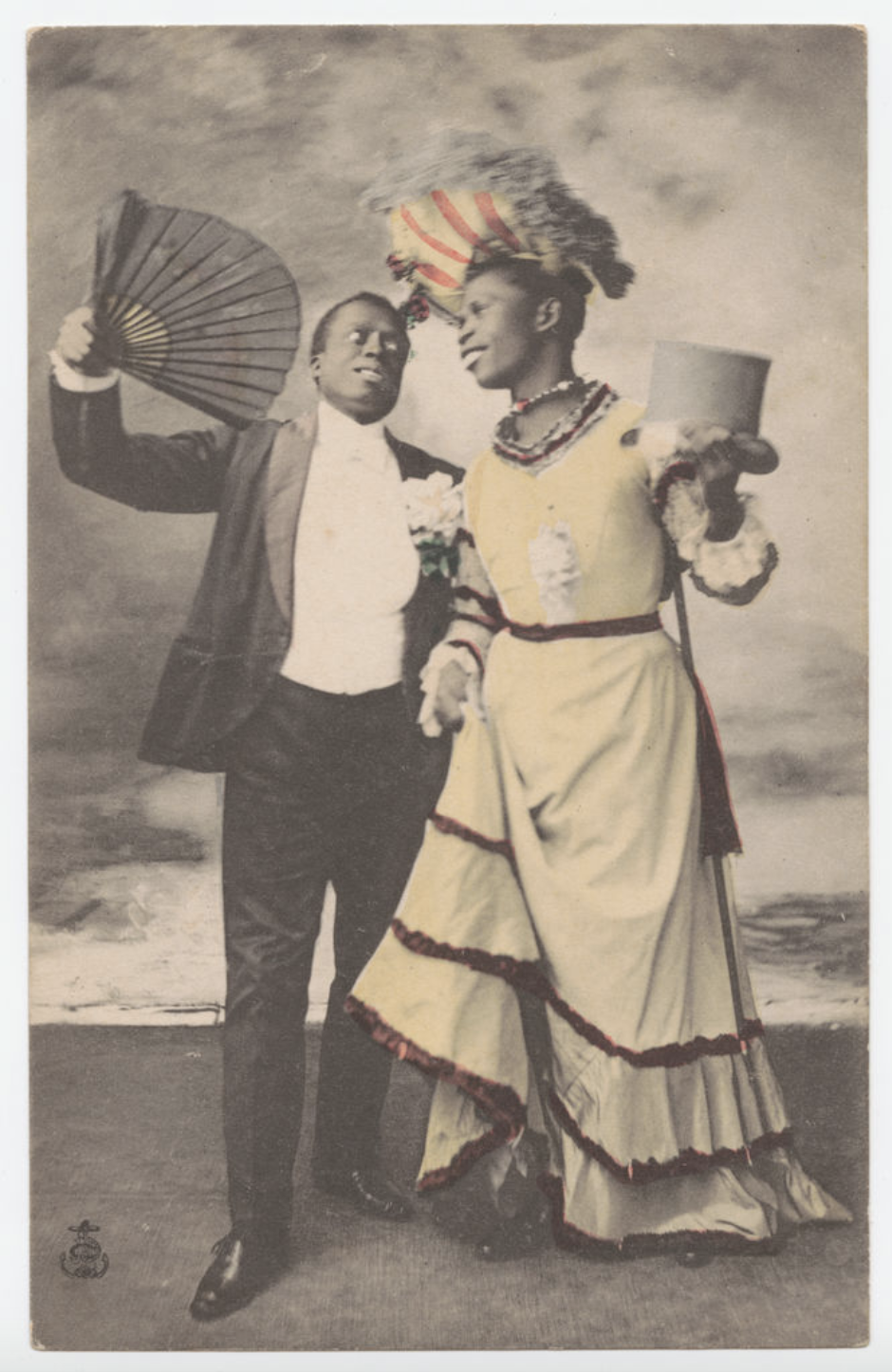
This 1908 photo was taken to promote the New Circus show "Joyeux Nègres", filmed by Louis Lumière. It belongs to the «Postcard of female and male impersonators and transvestites» from the Cornell University Library's Division of Rare and Manuscript Collections.

The history of cross-dressing in the United States is quite complicated as the title of 'cross-dresser' has been historically been utilized as an umbrella term for varying identities such as cisgender people who dressed in the other gender's clothing, transgender people, and intersex people who dress in both genders' clothing. The term pops up in many arrest records for these identities as they are perceived to be a form of 'disguise' rather than a gender identity. For example, Harry Allen (1888–1922), born female under the name Nell Pickerell in the Pacific Northwest, was categorized as a 'male impersonator' who cross-dressed; he self-identified and lived full time as a man, fitting more closely with the term transgender which originated after Allen's lifetime.

Edward Hyde, 3rd Earl of Clarendon, colonial governor of New York and New Jersey in the early 18th century is reported to have enjoyed going out wearing his wife's clothing, but this is disputed. Hyde was an unpopular figure, and rumors of his cross-dressing may have begun as an urban legend.

Because female enlistment was barred, many women fought for both the Union and the Confederacy during the American Civil War while dressed as men.

Other contemporary cross-dressing artists include J.S.G. Boggs.

The Gold Rush of 1849 led to a mass global migration of mainly male laborers to Northern California and the development of government backed economic interests in the Pacific Northwest region of the modern United States. The sudden explosive population increase resulted in a huge demand to import commodities including food, tools, sex, and entertainment, to these new male-oriented, homogeneous societies. As these societies evolved over the following decades, the growing demand for entertainment created a unique opportunity for male cross-dressers to perform. Cross-dressing was encouraged for entertainment purposes due to lack of women, yet the tolerance for the acts were limited to on-stage roles and did not extend to gender identities or same-sex desires. Julian Eltinge (1881–1941), a 'female impersonator' who performed in saloons in Montana as a kid and eventually made it to the Broadway stage, exemplifies this limited social acceptance for cross-dressing. His cross-dressing performances were celebrated by laborers who were starved for entertainment, yet his career was put at risk when he was exposed for exhibiting homosexual desires and behaviors.

Cross-dressing was not just reserved for men on stage. It also played a crucial role in the development of female involvement in the United States' industrial labor force. Many female-born workers dressed in men's clothing to secure a laborer's wage to provide for their families. Testimonial accounts from cross-dressing women who had been arrested reflect that many chose to identify as male due to financial incentives, even though basic cross-dressing had been deemed immoral and could lead to legal consequences. Women also chose to cross-dress because they feared they might become victims of physical harm while traveling alone across long distances.

San Francisco, California, was one of over 150 cities to have criminalized cross-dressing by framing the act as a form of immoral sexual perversion. The law was enforced by arrest; Gold Rush pioneer Marie Suize was arrested for wearing pants in San Francisco in 1871. In another case, doctor Hjelmar von Danneville was arrested in 1925, though she later negotiated with the city to obtain a permit to dress in masculine clothing.

The ban against transvestism in the United States military dates back to 1961.

==== US laws against crossdressing ====
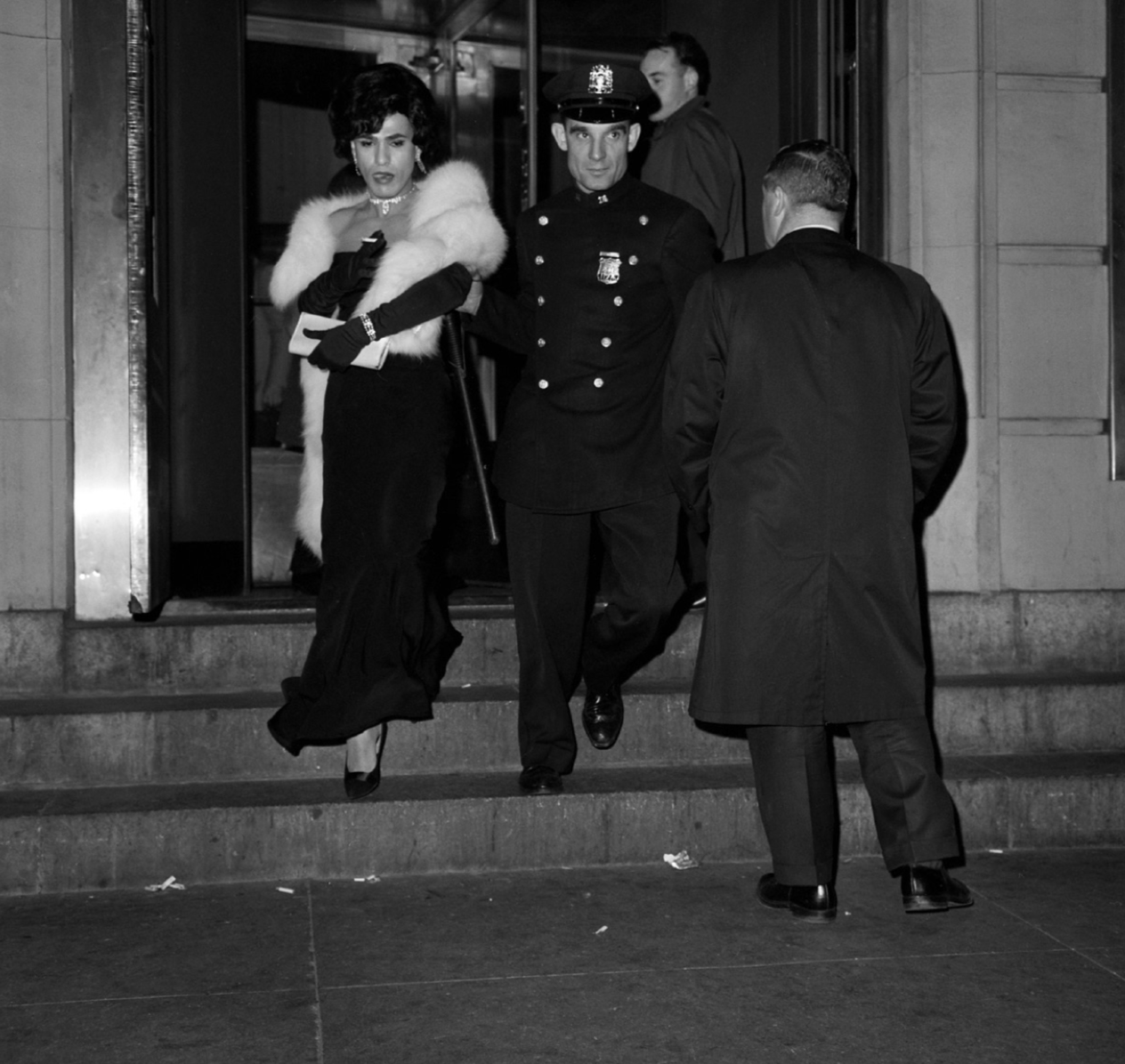
Drag queen arrested under anti-crossdressing laws in New York City, 1962

The birth of anti-cross-dressing laws (also known as masquerade laws and the three-article rule) stemmed from the increase in non-traditional gender expression during the spread of America's frontier, and the will to reinforce the two-gender system which was threatened by those who deviated from it. Some of the earlier cases of US arrests made due to cross-dressing are seen in 19th century Ohio. In 1848, Ohio passed a law which prohibited its citizens from publicly presenting themselves "in a dress not belonging to his or her sex," and during the 1850s, over 40 cities in the US went on to pass anti-cross-dressing laws. By the time the US entered WWI, over 150 cities had passed anti-cross-dressing ordinances. These cities were noticeably focused in the West, however across America many cities and states passed laws outlawing things such as public indecency or appearing in public under a disguise - effectively encompassing cross-dressing without mentioning sex or gender. The laws which did this often did not lend to an easy prosecution on the grounds of cross-dressing, because they were designed to prohibit presenting in disguise in order to commit a criminal offense. Because of this, the laws mainly served the purpose of allowing police to harass cross-dressers.

There is significant documentation of the origins of these laws in San Francisco. The city passed its anti-cross-dressing law in 1863, and the specific criminalization of one publicly presenting "in a dress not belonging to his or her sex" was included in a wider law which criminalized general public indecency such as nudity. This conflation of cross-dressing with acts such as prostitution was not unintentional, as many prostitutes at the time used cross-dressing to signify their availability. This association between the two furthered the perception of cross-dressing as a perversion, and the law was effectively "one of the city's very first "good morals and decency" laws".

Throughout time, anti-cross-dressing laws became difficult to apply, as the definitions of feminine and masculine presentation grew more obscure. After the Stonewall riots of 1969, cross-dressing arrests decreased and became much less common. In 1986, the case D.C. & M.S. v. City of St. Louis centered on an anti-cross-dressing city ordinance, with the presiding judge ruling that laws with criminal penalties must be strictly construed.

=== France ===
As the Hundred Years' War developed in the late Middle Ages, cross dressing was a way for French women to join the cause against England. Joan of Arc was a 15th-century French peasant girl who joined French armies against English forces fighting in France during the latter part of the Hundred Years' War. She is a French national heroine and a Catholic saint. After being captured by the English, she was burned at the stake upon being convicted by a pro-English religious court, with the act of dressing in male (soldiers') clothing being cited as one of the principal reasons for her execution. A number of eyewitnesses, however, later explained that she had said she wore soldiers' clothing in prison (consisting of hosen and long hip-boots attached to the doublet with twenty fasteners) because this made it more difficult for her guards to pull her clothing off during rape attempts. She was, however, burned alive in a long white gown.

In the seventeenth century, France underwent a financially driven social conflict, the Fronde. At this period, women disguised themselves as men and enlisted in the army, sometimes with their male family members. Cross dressing also became a more common strategy for women to conceal their gender as they traveled, granting a safer and more efficient route. The practice of cross dressing was present more in literary works than in real life situations, despite its effective concealing properties.

Charlotte d'Éon de Beaumont (1728–1810), usually known as the Chevalière d'Éon, was a French diplomat and soldier who lived the first half of her life as a man and the second half as a woman. In 1771 she stated that physically she was not a man, but a woman, having only been brought up as a man. From then on she lived as a woman. Though of ambiguous sex, she served the French military and French King as both a male-presenting soldier and a female-presenting spy.

George Sand is the pseudonym of Amandine-Aurore-Lucile Dupin, an early 19th-century novelist who preferred to wear men's clothing exclusively. In her autobiography, she explains in length the various aspects of how she experienced cross-dressing.

Rrose Sélavy, the feminine alter-ego of artist Marcel Duchamp, remains one of the most complex and pervasive pieces in the enigmatic puzzle of the artist's oeuvre. She first emerged in portraits made by the photographer Man Ray in New York in the early 1920s, when Duchamp and Man Ray were collaborating on a number of conceptual photographic works. Rrose Sélavy lived on as the person to whom Duchamp attributed specific works of art, Readymades, puns, and writings throughout his career.

=== England, Scotland, and Ireland ===
In medieval England, cross dressing was normal practice in the theatre, used by men and young boys dressing and playing both roles of male and female. During early modern London, religious authorities were against cross-dressing in theater due to it disregarding social conduct and causing gender confusion.

Later, during the eighteenth century in London, crossdressing became a part of the club culture. Crossdressing took a part in men's only clubs where men would meet at these clubs dressed as women and drink. One of the most well known clubs for men to do this was known as the Molly Club or Molly House.

Anne Bonny and Mary Read were 18th-century pirates who wore sailor pants, jackets, and tied handkerchiefs around their heads during pirate actions. Charles Edward Stuart dressed as Flora MacDonald's maid servant, Betty Burke, to escape the Battle of Culloden for the island of Skye in 1746. Mary Hamilton dressed as a man to learn medicine and later married a woman in 1746. It was also alleged that she had married and abandoned many others, for either financial gain or for sexual gratification. She was convicted of fraud for misrepresenting herself as a man to her bride. Ann Mills fought as a dragoon in 1740. Hannah Snell served as a man in the Royal Marines 1747–1750, being wounded 11 times, and was granted a military pension.

Dorothy Lawrence was a war reporter who disguised herself as a man so she could become a soldier in World War I.

Conspiracy theorist Vernon Coleman cross-dresses and has written several articles about men who cross-dress. Artist and Turner Prize winner, Grayson Perry often appears as his alter-ego, Clare. Writer, presenter and actor Richard O'Brien sometimes cross-dresses and ran a "Transfandango" ball aimed at transgender people of all kinds in aid of charity for several years in the early 2000s (decade). Eddie Izzard, stand-up comedian and actor, states that she has cross-dressed her entire life. She often performs her act in feminine clothing, and has discussed her cross dressing as part of her act. She calls herself an "executive transvestite".

In 1994, Conservative Member of Parliament Stephen Milligan was found dead wearing only women’s stockings and suspenders - it was believed he died accidentally while engaged in an auto-erotic sex practice.

=== Japan ===
Japan has a centuries-old tradition of male kabuki theatre actors cross-dressing onstage. Transgender men (and more rarely, women) were also "conspicuous" in Tokyo's gei (gay) bar and club subculture in the pre- and post-World War II period. By the 1950s, publications concerning MTF cross-dressing were in circulation, advertising themselves as aimed at the "study" of the phenomenon. Fully-fledged "commercial" magazines aimed at cross-dressing 'hobbyists' began publishing after the launch of the first such magazine, Queen, in 1980. It was affiliated with the Elizabeth Club, which opened branch clubs in several Tokyo suburbs and other cities. Yasumasa Morimura is a contemporary artist who cross-dresses.

=== Thailand ===
Through the pre-modern age, cross-dressing and transgender appearance in Thailand was apparent in many contexts including same-sex theater performance. The term Kathoey came to describe anyone from cross-dressers to transgender men (and women) as the practice became more prevalent in everyday life. Lack of colonization by Western civilizations in Thailand have led to different ways of thinking about gender and self-identity. In turn, Thailand has fostered one of the most open and tolerant traditions towards Kathoeys and cross-dressers in the world. In contrast to many Western civilizations, where homosexuality and cross-dressing have been historically criminal offenses, Thai legal codes have not explicitly criminalized these behaviors. It was not until the 20th century that a public majority, whether on stage or in public, came to assume cross-dressing a sign of transgenderism and homosexuality.

=== China ===
Since the Yuan dynasty, cross-dressing has had a unique significance in Chinese opera. Period scholars cite this time in Chinese theatre as the "golden age." The rise of dan, though characterized as female characters, was a prominent feature of the Peking Opera and many males took the roles of females. There were schools dedicated to the specific dan training as well. Female crossdressers in the Chinese opera were also valued immensely and prospered far better than male crossdressers did. Chinese women became known as kunsheng, which translates to "female male."

The Yuan dynasty is known for recognizing and accepting the involvement of many Chinese women in theatrical plays. In a time of male dominance politics, the Yuan dynasty allowed women to participe in these plays and often played main roles. Chinese opera was influenced by early-century historical events, poems, and mythology. By using a mixture of different art forms like music, dancing and singing, many women were able to fit into these roles. Lead-roles were the only people that had singing parts, the rest of the supporting roles only talked. That same person often played different characters and different genders because they were the only ones allowed to sing on stage. If it was a male-role, women would be given the part and disguised themselves through clothing, physical movements, gestures, and skills to portray each character.

Hua Mulan, the central figure of the Ballad of Mulan (and of the Disney film Mulan), may be a historical or fictional figure. She is said to have lived in China during the Northern Wei, and to have posed as a man to fulfill the household draft quota, thus saving her ill and aged father from serving.

Shi Pei Pu was a male Peking Opera singer. Spying on behalf of the Chinese Government during the Cultural Revolution, he cross-dressed to gain information from Bernard Boursicot, a French diplomat. Their relationship lasted 20 years, during which they married. David Henry Hwang's 1988 play M. Butterfly is loosely based on their story.

== See also ==
- Cross dressing ball
- History of drag
- Transgender history
