= Lundie =

Coordinates: 56.515182°N 3.153778°W

- Location within Angus
- OS grid reference: NO291365
- Council area: Angus
- Lieutenancy area: Angus
- Country: Scotland
- Sovereign state: United Kingdom
- Post town: DUNDEE
- Postcode district: DD2
- Dialling code: 01382
- Police: Scotland
- Fire: Scottish
- Ambulance: Scottish
- UK Parliament: Dundee West
- Scottish Parliament: Angus South

Lundie is a parish and small settlement in Angus, Scotland, 10 miles (16 km) northwest of Dundee, situated at the head of the Dighty valley in the Sidlaws, off the A923 Dundee to Coupar Angus road. The name Lundie probably derives from the Gaelic "lunnd" or "lunndann", meaning "little marsh", although "lon dubh" ("black marsh" or even "linn dei" ("water of God") have also been proposed. Lundie is surrounded by several small lochs, whose size has been reduced in recent times by agricultural drainage, hence largely draining the eponymous marshes.

Dorward states that in 1203 Walter of Lundie gave 20 acres (81,000 m^{2}) of land to the prior and canons of St Andrews. Lundie Castle, now just a few stones, was probably built in the sixteenth century on a hill to the east. During the reign of King David II (1329-1371) John Iles was created the Baron of Lundie which has passed through many incumbents. The Barony title is currently held by The Much Hon. Craig Ward, Baron of Lundie. He is an English solicitor and writes legal text books.

The population of Lundie has declined from 448 in 1841 to under a hundred now; the shops and alehouses closed some time ago, the fairs are no longer held, and the school was closed in 1967. Its people and history have survived.

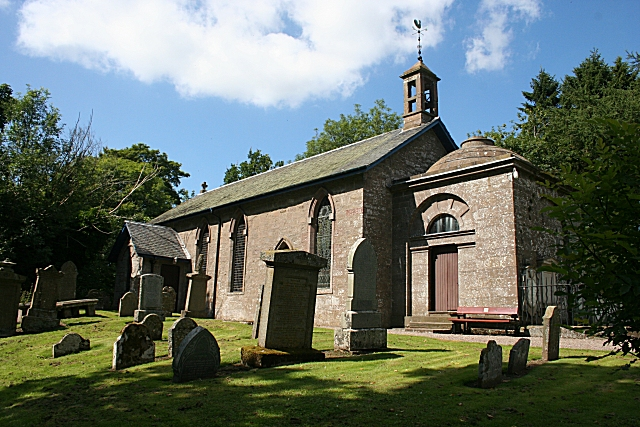
Lundie Kirk

Lundie is notable for being the burial place of Adam Duncan, 1st Viscount Duncan. The churchyard of Lundie church contains an Abraham and Isaac stone. Although the church is an ancient foundation, it was drastically restored in 1847. The church which had fallen into disuse was ruined by a fire on 18 November 2022, reducing Lundie to a hamlet. Nearby Lundie Crags (353 m, OS reference NO 282 378) are a popular walking destination.

== Lundie in myth ==
Sir James the Rose was supposedly killed on a grassy bank near Lundie Craigs.
