= Mokopuna Island =

Island in New Zealand

Nickname: Leper Island
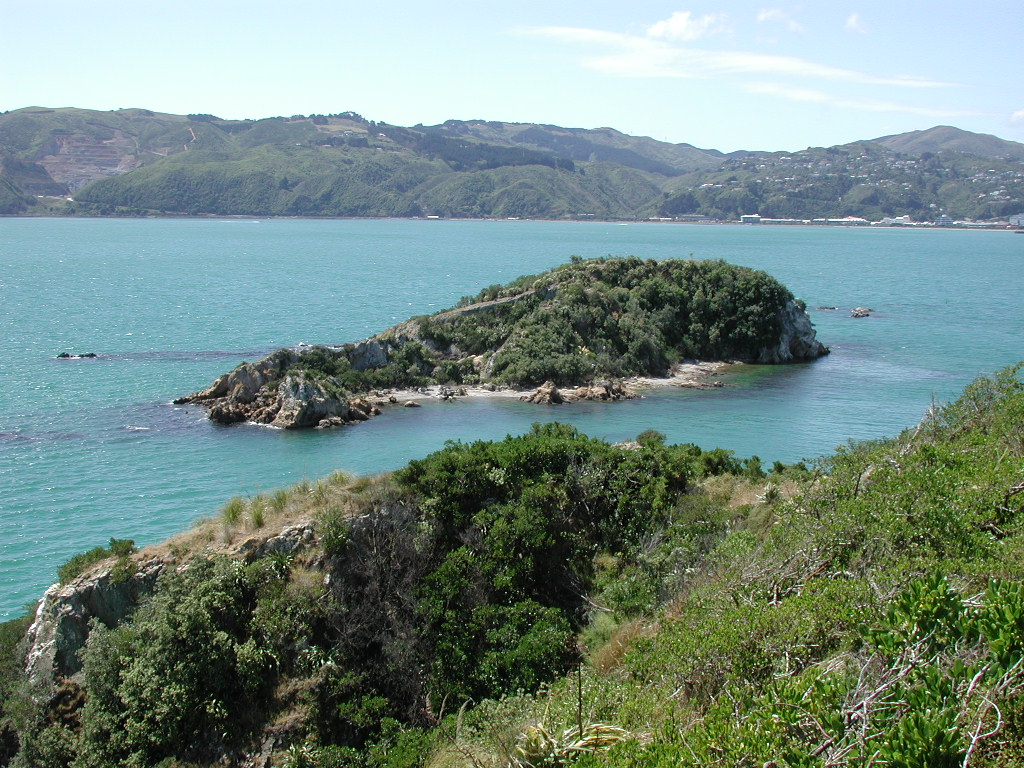
- Mokopuna Island, from Matiu / Somes Island
- Interactive map of Mokopuna Island

Geography
- Coordinates: 41°15′S 174°52′E
- Length: 200 m (700 ft)
- Width: 80 m (260 ft)

Administration
- New Zealand

Demographics
- Population: 0

Mokopuna (the 'grandchild') Island is a small uninhabited island in Wellington Harbour, New Zealand. It is about 200 metres (219 yd) on its long axis and about 80 metres (87 yd) across. It lies immediately north of the much larger Matiu / Somes Island, from which it is separated by a channel about 50 metres (55 yd) wide.

A number of wave-cut arches and caves line the shore. Mokopuna is a scientific reserve where gulls and blue penguins nest and where no landings are allowed.

== History ==
Mokopuna Island was known for many years as Leper Island. For about three months in 1904, one of the caves on the island was the home of one Kim Lee, a Cantonese fruiterer who had been diagnosed—possibly mistakenly—as a leper. Although Matiu / Somes was the human quarantine station at the time, Lee was exiled to Mokopuna, where he was supplied with food and water by a flying fox from Matiu / Somes. Lee died on Mokopuna on 14 March 1904 and was buried on Matiu / Somes. The name Mokopuna Island was restored in August 1947 after a request from the Wellington Beautifying Society to the Geographic Board of the Lands and Survey Department.

Six tuatara were released on Mokopuna Island by the Department of Internal Affairs in April 1920 and thought to still be there in 1935 though none were seen. In November 1947 a member of the public reported that rabbits were numerous on Mokopuna Island, having been let loose there by an unknown person. The rabbits were causing extensive damage to the local plant life, ringbarking trees and eating other plants, and degradation of the plant cover was causing soil erosion. A poisoning operation killed 101 rabbits in three days. Further extermination of rabbits was carried out, and by late 1951 the island's vegetation had begun to regenerate.

== Transfer of ownership ==
In 2009, ownership of the island was transferred to the Māori collective Taranaki Whānui ki Te Upoko o Te Ika, along with Matiu / Somes Island and Mākoro / Ward Island. The transfer of ownership was part of cultural redress for Taranaki Whānui included in the settlement of their claims against the Crown for breaches of the Treaty of Waitangi. Following the passing of the 'Port Nicholson Block (Taranaki Whānui ki Te Upoko o Te Ika) Claims Settlement Act 2009', ownership of the island is vested in the trustees of the Port Nicholson Block Settlement Trust. A kaitiaki (management) plan was prepared in 2012, to guide the administration of the island in accordance with the Reserves Act 1977.

== See also ==
- List of islands of New Zealand
