= Mask law =

Mask law may refer to:

- Anti-mask laws, prohibiting concealing one's face
- Laws for face masks during the COVID-19 pandemic, mandating the wearing of masks, especially during the pandemic
- Masquerade laws, an interpretation of anti-mask laws that historically curtailed cross-dressing in many localities of the United States
