= Matiu / Somes Island =

Island in Wellington, New Zealand

- Matiu (Māori)
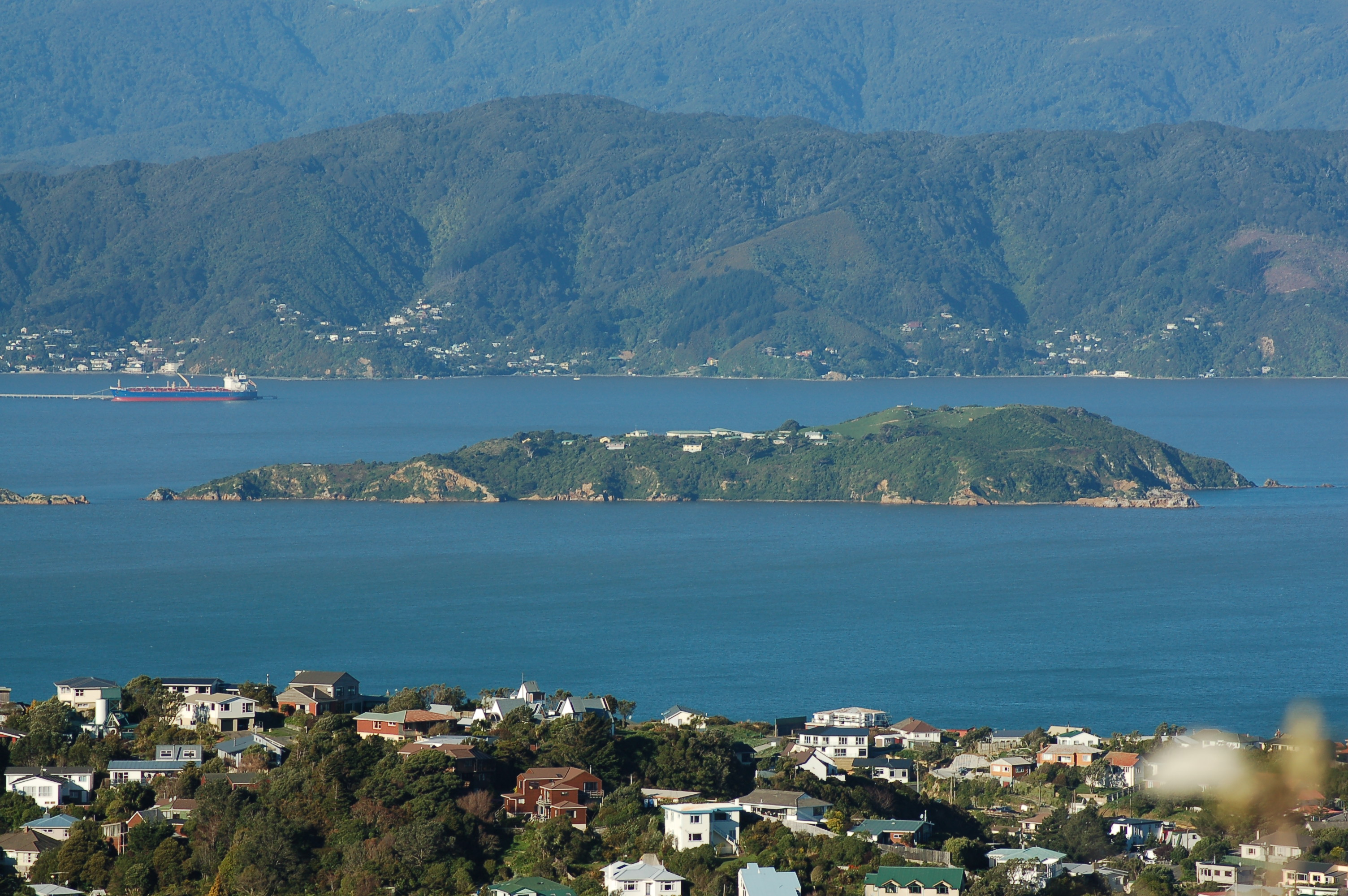
- Matiu / Somes Island as seen from Mount Kaukau
- Interactive map of Matiu / Somes Island
- Nearest city: Wellington
- Coordinates: 41°15′29.7″S 174°51′55.4″E
- Area: 24.9 ha (62 acres)
- Max. elevation: 74 metres (243 ft)
- Designation: Historic reserve; scientific reserve
- Designated: 1995
- Governing body: Harbour Islands Kaitiaki Board
- Operator: Department of Conservation

Matiu / Somes Island is the largest of three islands in the northern half of Wellington Harbour, New Zealand. The island is 24.9 hectares (62 acres) in area, and lies 3 kilometres (1.9 mi) south of the suburb of Petone and the mouth of the Hutt River.

Matiu / Somes Island was used as a place of refuge by pre-colonial Māori. Middens and other remnants of habitation have been found on the island. There is also a long and varied European history. The island was used for human quarantine from 1840 until the 1920s. Ships arriving in Wellington Harbour with infectious passengers or crew would disembark them at Matiu / Somes Island for care and treatment before berthing in the city. During both World War I and World War II, "enemy aliens", including long-term residents of New Zealand who originated from enemy countries, were interned on the island. Anti-aircraft gun emplacements were also built on the island during World War II and their remains can be seen today. The island was used for animal quarantine from 1864 until 1995. A maximum security animal quarantine station was built in 1968.

The island's environment had become degraded during its long period of use for quarantine and defence purposes. However, in 1981 work began to restore the forest cover. Following more than 30 years of environmental restoration and the translocation of species, the island is now home to many native birds, invertebrates, reptiles and plants. Since 1995, Matiu / Somes Island has been designated as a scientific and historic reserve. For many years the public was banned from visiting the island due to its role as a human and animal quarantine station, but visitors are now welcome and may stay overnight on the island.

In 2009, ownership of the island was transferred to the Māori collective Taranaki Whānui ki Te Upoko o Te Ika, as part of the settlement of claims against the Crown for breaches of the Treaty of Waitangi. The island is managed by the Department of Conservation.

== Toponymy ==
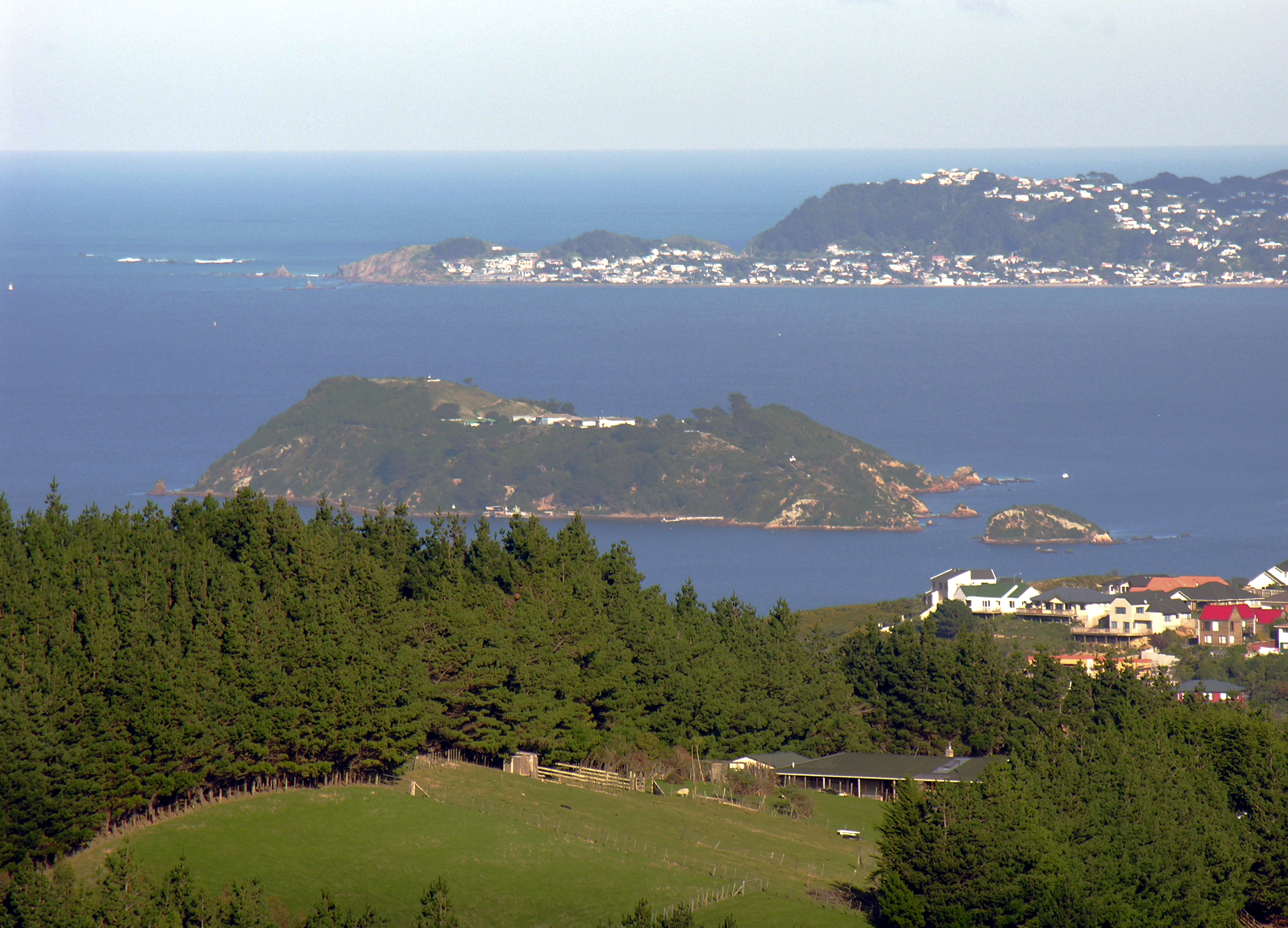
Matiu / Somes Island as seen from Normandale, Lower Hutt

Legend has it that Matiu and the nearby Mākaro island received their original Māori names from Kupe, the semi-legendary first navigator to reach New Zealand and return home with knowledge of the new land. He named them after his two daughters (or, in some versions of the tale, nieces) when he first entered the harbour around 1,000 CE.

After European settlement, the island was known for over a century as Somes Island. In 1839 it fell under the control of the New Zealand Company along with much of the greater Wellington Region. The island was renamed after Joseph Somes, the company's deputy-governor and financier at the time. In 1997, after 10 months of investigation and consideration of submissions by the public, the New Zealand Geographic Board assigned the official bilingual name of "Matiu/Somes Island" in recognition of the island's European and Māori histories. Ward Island was renamed as Mākaro/Ward Island at the same time. Since then the board has adopted the formatting convention of placing a space before and after the slash, so the official name is now written as "Matiu / Somes Island".

== Geography ==
The island is 24.9 hectares (62 acres) in area, and lies 3 kilometres (1.9 mi) south of the suburb of Petone and the mouth of the Hutt River. Just off the northern tip of Matiu / Somes Island lies tiny Mokopuna Island, also known as Leper Island. The much smaller Mākaro / Ward Island is about 5 kilometres (3 mi) southeast of Matiu / Somes Island.

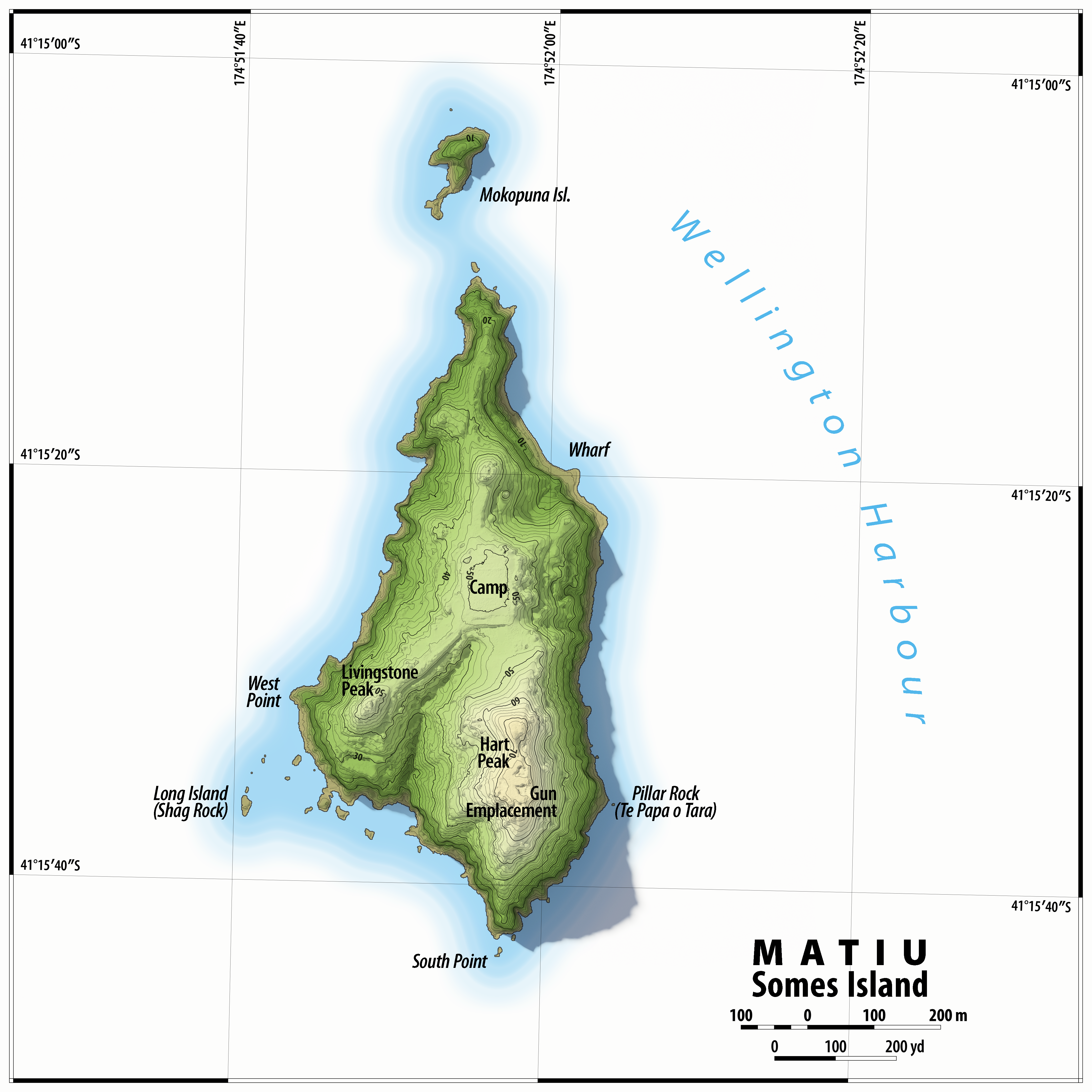
Topographic map of Matiu /Somes Island

A distinct gully runs from the south of the former quarantine station and terminates at the sea on the southern end of the island between two largely forested ridges on either side to the east and west. The gully floor forms a swamp, but an ephemeral watercourse flows through it during periods of heavy rain. A 1942 map shows a small dam across the creek.

Despite being surrounded by sea water, Matiu / Somes Island has access to fresh water from the Waiwhetu artesian aquifer. Water from the Hutt River infiltrates into porous gravels in the vicinity of Taita Gorge, with between 3.8 and 5.7 million litres per hour flowing from the bed of the river into the underlying gravels between Taita Gorge and Melling. South of Melling, a layer of clay forms an impervious cap (or aquiclude) that holds the artesian water underground and causes it to build up pressure as it flows through the gravel layer southwards towards Wellington Harbour. The pressurised water can rise to the surface if the fresh water layer is penetrated with a bore hole. There are also artesian gravels beneath much of Wellington Harbour, in some places hundreds of metres deep, and they extend out to the present harbour entrance. The water level in the harbour was much lower 20,000 years ago, and the ancient Hutt River used to flow down a paleochannel to the east of the Matiu / Somes Island ridge as far as present-day Kilbirnie. The Waiwhetu aquifer flows under the sea bed from the direction of the Hutt River to the harbour mouth via the paleochannel. Matiu / Somes Island gets its fresh water from a bore sunk into the aquifer just offshore at the main wharf. In February 2016, the Department of Conservation temporarily restricted access to the island because a long dry summer had lowered the volume and pressure of water from the aquifer, requiring strict water conservation.

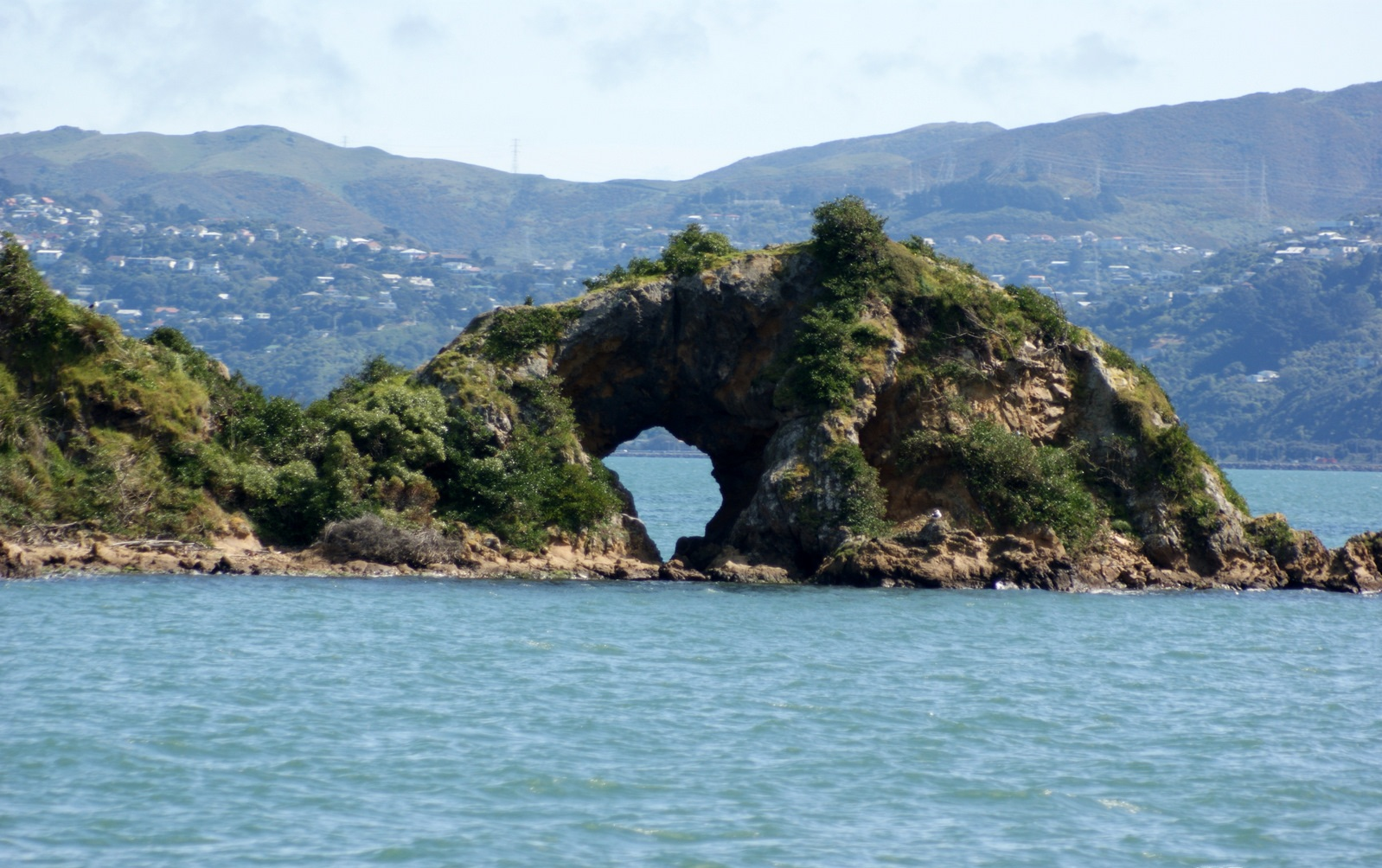
Rock arch and raised platform at the northern tip of Matiu / Somes Island

The island has three benches or platforms at 30, 45 and 75 metres above the current mean sea level. The origin of these benches is uncertain. Similar levels are found on various ridges around the harbour, and the flat top of Makaro / Ward Island corresponds to the 30 metre level. They are likely to be interglacial wave cut benches that have been uplifted. No marine deposits have been found on the benches, but it is possible that they result from a combination of fluvial processes and tectonic uplift. If they were wave cut benches any marine deposits have been eroded away. The 1855 Wairarapa earthquake raised Matiu / Somes Island by about 1.5 metres. The perimeters of both Matiu / Somes and Mokopuna Island have shore platforms that were eroded by the sea prior to the 1855 earthquake. There are some remnants of an earlier platform at 2.4 to 3 m above the present mean sea level. A rock arch and platform at the northern end of Matiu / Somes Island was formed by the action of the sea, but was raised above sea-level by successive earthquakes, including the 1855 Wairarapa earthquake. The arch now appears as a hole in the rock, above sea level.

Somes Rock is an underwater pinnacle off the southwest point of Matiu / Somes island.

== Climate ==
Climate data for Somes Island (1981–2010)
Month	Jan	Feb	Mar	Apr	May	Jun	Jul	Aug	Sep	Oct	Nov	Dec	Year
Mean daily maximum °C (°F)	20.3 (68.5)	20.7 (69.3)	19.1 (66.4)	16.8 (62.2)	14.8 (58.6)	12.5 (54.5)	11.8 (53.2)	12.3 (54.1)	13.8 (56.8)	14.9 (58.8)	16.6 (61.9)	18.5 (65.3)	16.0 (60.8)
Daily mean °C (°F)	17.3 (63.1)	17.5 (63.5)	16.1 (61.0)	13.9 (57.0)	12.1 (53.8)	10.0 (50.0)	9.2 (48.6)	9.7 (49.5)	11.1 (52.0)	12.2 (54.0)	13.6 (56.5)	15.7 (60.3)	13.2 (55.8)
Mean daily minimum °C (°F)	14.4 (57.9)	14.3 (57.7)	13.0 (55.4)	10.9 (51.6)	9.4 (48.9)	7.5 (45.5)	6.5 (43.7)	7.0 (44.6)	8.3 (46.9)	9.5 (49.1)	10.7 (51.3)	13.0 (55.4)	10.4 (50.7)
Average rainfall mm (inches)	61.2 (2.41)	54.0 (2.13)	88.3 (3.48)	77.7 (3.06)	101.0 (3.98)	117.7 (4.63)	111.9 (4.41)	93.1 (3.67)	90.0 (3.54)	80.7 (3.18)	92.1 (3.63)	71.1 (2.80)	1,038.8 (40.92)
Source: NIWA

== Geology ==
Matiu / Somes Island and the surrounding landscape of Wellington is dominated by grey sandstone and darker mudstone sequences, together commonly known as greywacke. In the harbour surrounding the island, the greywacke basement is overlain unconformably by solifluction debris and river gravels, then shelly marine silts, and finally artesian gravels that are capped with shelly marine silts.

Matiu / Somes Island is an uplifted block of greywacke, a horst structure thought to be part of a drowned ridge pushed up between faults that run northeast–southwest close to the west and east sides of the island. The faults extend from just offshore of Petone beach to about 1 km south of the island. The greywacke at Matiu / Somes Island, and the surrounding Wellington landscape, is Late Triassic in age and assigned to the Rakaia Terrane, one of several terranes that collectively make up the Torlesse Composite Terrane (also known as the Torlesse Supergroup). (Note: The eastern half of the North Island, from the Bay of Plenty to Wellington, has a Torlesse Composite Terrane basement.) A tube fossil (Torlessia mackayi ) (Note: Belongs to the order Foraminiferida; found in Torlesse Supergroup, Rakaia Terrane (North Otago, inland Canterbury, Wellington) and Taringatura Group (Southland); age range: Late Triassic (237–201 Ma); slender, tapering, slightly curved, cylindrical tube fossils; pale grey to white; smooth; commonly squashed with deformation fractures along tube length (20–70 mm long); up to 5 mm wide; original shell composed of agglutinated mineral grains; originally sticking upright in soft seafloor in deep water and filter feeding on plankton and suspended organic matter; the most common fossil found in greywacke.) has been found on the island. Although it has not been formally identified, it has been documented with an age range of 215-205 Ma (Late Triassic). Tube fossils have also been found at other nearby locations such as Princess Bay and Sinclair Head, along the shore platform of Wellington's south coast.

== History ==
=== Māori history ===
During the 18th century Ngāti Ira, an East Coast iwi, settled in Petone and around the eastern shores of the harbour. They built two pā on the island but there was no permanent settlement on the island due to limited resources there. Ngāti Mutunga and Ngāti Tama from Taranaki drove Ngāti Ira from their settlements in the 1820s.

In November 1835 Ngāti Mutunga people, affiliated to Te Āti Awa, seized the ship Lord Rodney at Wellington. The crew were tied up and the Lord Rodney's captain John Harewood was forced or bribed to take a group of hundreds of Māori to the Chatham Islands. To ensure Harewood's compliance, his chief mate was held hostage on Matiu / Somes Island. There was no Māori occupation on Matiu / Somes from about 1840.

==== Archaeological sites ====
At the northern end of the island on a site with steep cliffs there was the Te Moana–a–kura pā which contained terraces and middens. Haowhenua pā was built in the middle of the island, where the quarantine station was sited, but the only remaining sign of occupation is a midden. The midden, which was underneath the hospital building, was uncovered and excavated during building work in 1999. Faunal remains included shellfish (species from the mainland), fish and bird bones.

=== European history ===
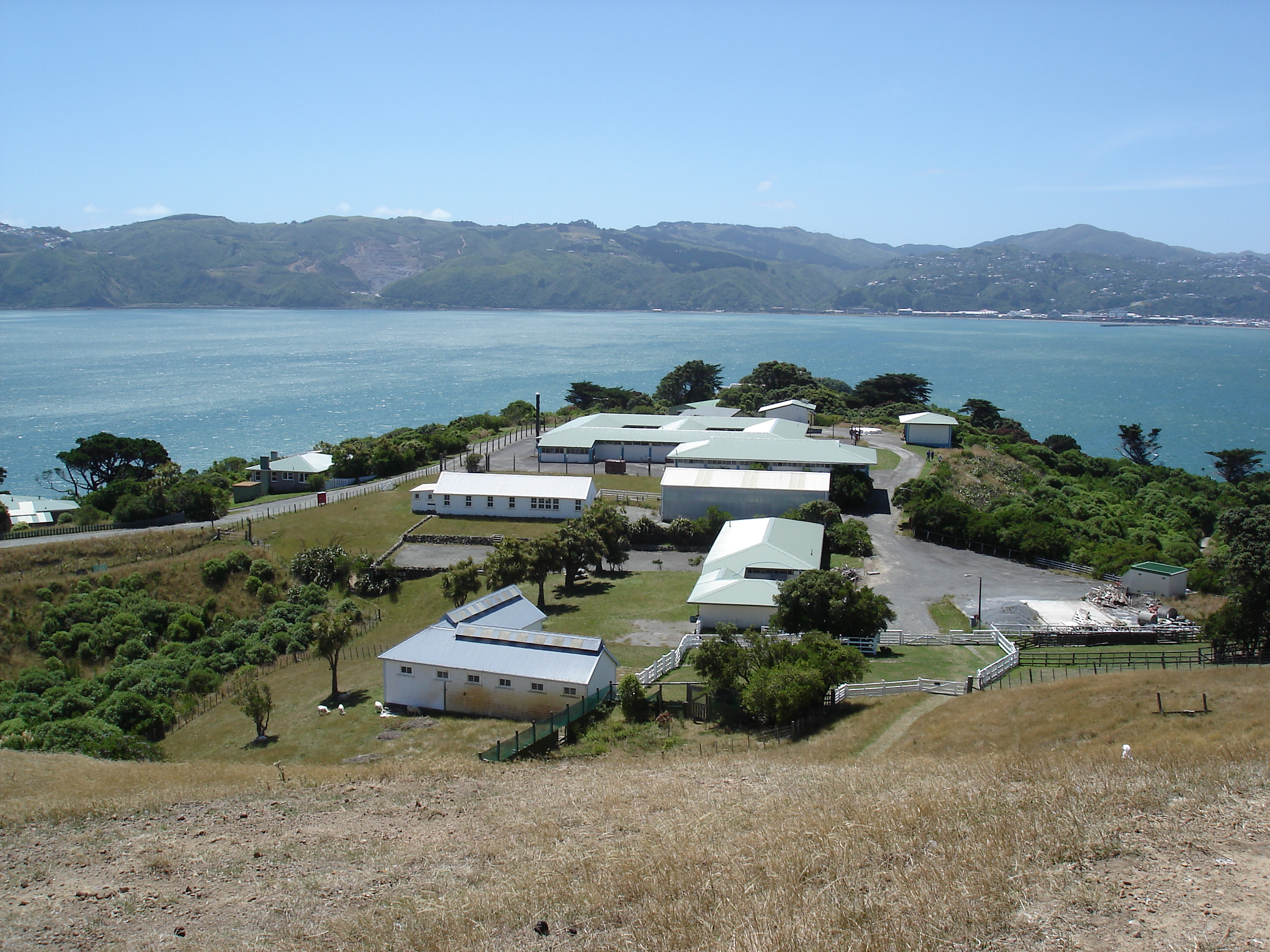
NZ Department of Conservation buildings

At various times throughout the 19th and 20th centuries the island hosted quarantine facilities for both human immigrants and animals, and enemy alien internees during wartime.

==== Human quarantine ====
In 1868 the island was declared a quarantine ground and used to isolate passengers from a ship carrying smallpox. When the immigrant ship England arrived in 1872 carrying several passengers with smallpox, passengers and crew were quartered in makeshift accommodation on the island. On other occasions, new arrivals would spend ten minutes in a smokehouse of chlorine, potassium nitrate and sulphur fumes for de-lousing. During the influenza pandemic of 1918–1920, a few people were quarantined on Matiu / Somes Island, but there was general agreement that the facilities were completely inadequate. The government then built accommodation for hundreds more people. In 1920, some passengers and crew from the ship Mahana were quarantined on Matiu / Somes Island with scarlet fever, but the quarantine station fell out of use after this. In 1935 the Government announced that it would reduce the number of quarantine beds on the island from 600 to about 50, but the Ministry of Health continued to restrict access to the island. In 1946, after World War II had ended, the island was offered back to the Ministry of Health but it declined to retake control.

Forty-five people are known to be buried on the island, mostly immigrants who arrived in the 1870s. In 1971, individual gravestones were removed from the overgrown cemetery and replaced with a large memorial. In January 2000, four of the old headstones were retrieved from storage and placed next to the communal memorial.

==== Animal quarantine ====
Use of the island as an animal quarantine facility is recorded as early as 1864, when an advertisement in the Wellington Independent recorded that a man named James Sellars had been permitted to use it as a quarantine ground for his sheep. In 1889 Matiu / Somes Island was declared as the first animal quarantine station in New Zealand. In 1892 the government established a Department of Agriculture to protect New Zealand's farming industry, and in 1893 passed the Stock Act. The Stock Act 1893 gave the Department of Agriculture power to quarantine all live animals arriving in the country, so it built permanent animal quarantine facilities on Matiu / Somes Island (in 1893) and at other locations for this purpose. In 1916, internees on the island built stables for the quarantine station.

In 1968 the government built a maximum security animal quarantine station. It had laboratories, animal pens and other facilities for quarantining up to 35 cattle and 150 sheep, and there were associated new homes for the workers and their families. Other animals quarantined included goats, alpacas, llamas and deer. The quarantine station was officially opened in December 1970. It closed in 1995 after in-vitro fertilisation technology was developed, making importation and quarantining of live breeding stock unnecessary.

==== World War I internment camp ====
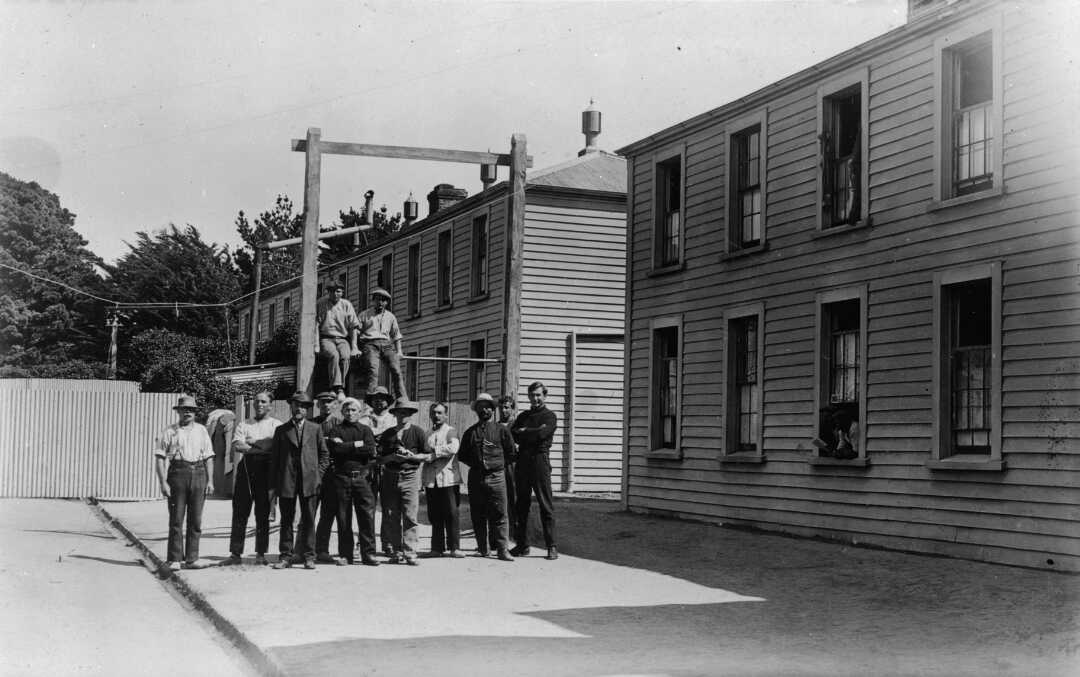
Men on Somes Island c. 1914, including internees

During World War I the island continued to be used for quarantining animals but was also used for an internment camp which imprisoned about 300 "enemy aliens". Prisoners during this time included many German prisoners of war and suspected Danish imposter Hjelmar von Danneville. Other "enemy aliens" included German residents of New Zealand who were considered dangerous or who were reservists in the German or Austrian armies, sailors who had been at sea when war broke out, and Germans from Samoa. A 12-man Bavarian Band who had been touring New Zealand in 1914 were interned on the island for five years; there they entertained other internees.

In March 1915 two prisoners escaped from the island by swimming to Petone, where they turned themselves in at a police station, seeking to alert the authorities to allegedly poor treatment of internees. In July 1918 four men escaped on a raft made of wood with oil drums for buoyancy, landing at Ngauranga; one of the men died of exposure on the beach and the others were recaptured after seeking help.

An inquiry was held towards the end of the war into numerous accusations of mistreatment of alien internees on the island. Although in general the inquiry report found an absence of evidence to support charges of ill-treatment, it did make some recommendations to improve conditions for internees, and noted the use of "disrespectful language" by the camp overseer.

After the war ended, the internees were transferred to Featherston military camp and from there 260 of them were deported back to Germany. In 1919 the Bavarian Band returned to Europe on the steamship Willochra. The island reverted to use as a human quarantine station.

==== World War II internment camp ====
On 29 August 1939 Matiu / Somes Island was handed over from the Health Department to the Army and again shifted from quarantine station to internment camp, with the first group of internees arriving in late December 1939. Internees included German and Italian residents of New Zealand and men from Pacific Islands plantations. By January 1942 there were also 45 Japanese internees who were New Zealand residents and fishermen from Suva. Tensions developed amongst the various national groups, in particular between German Nazis and German Jews. As in World War I, there were allegations of ill-treatment of the men on the island. Three men escaped in November 1941 in a boat stolen from the island's caretaker and made it to the Akatarawa hills before hunger forced them out to buy food and they were rearrested.

In 1942, the island was fortified with heavy anti-aircraft gun emplacements on the summit, but they were never used. A large area was levelled for this construction, with the result that 17 metres (56 ft) was removed from the island's previous overall height. A degaussing station was built to provide protection for ships against magnetic mines. Many of the physical features of these sites are present on the island today. The Swiss Consul protested that with military equipment on the island it had become a potential target, and that keeping prisoners in a potential conflict zone was against the Geneva Convention. The Government moved the internees to a camp at Pahiatua, but in September 1944 this was needed for Polish refugee children so the prisoners were sent back to Matiu / Somes Island (apart from the Italians who had been allowed to return to their families after Italy signed an armistice in March 1944). At the end of the war the remaining internees were released and some were permitted to stay in New Zealand if they wished. In 1995, Club Garibaldi, a Wellington social club for people of Italian origin, erected a monument listing 38 Italians who had been interned on the island during the war.

==== Quarantine station to scientific reserve ====
From 1947 to 1995 the island was used as a quarantine station for livestock, with limited access to the public from 1981 onwards. In December 1983, the island was still a maximum security animal quarantine station. However, over the 1983/84 summer period, the Ministry of Agriculture and Fisheries agreed to allow day visits to the island by members of the public, limited to 120 visitors per open day. The visits were by permit only, and access to the quarantine station was not allowed. The day visits were co-ordinated by the Wellington Regional Council.

Matiu / Somes Island came under the jurisdiction of the newly-formed Lower Hutt City Council in 1989 and came under the full control of the Department of Conservation (DOC) as a scientific and historic reserve in August 1995.

=== Transfer of ownership ===
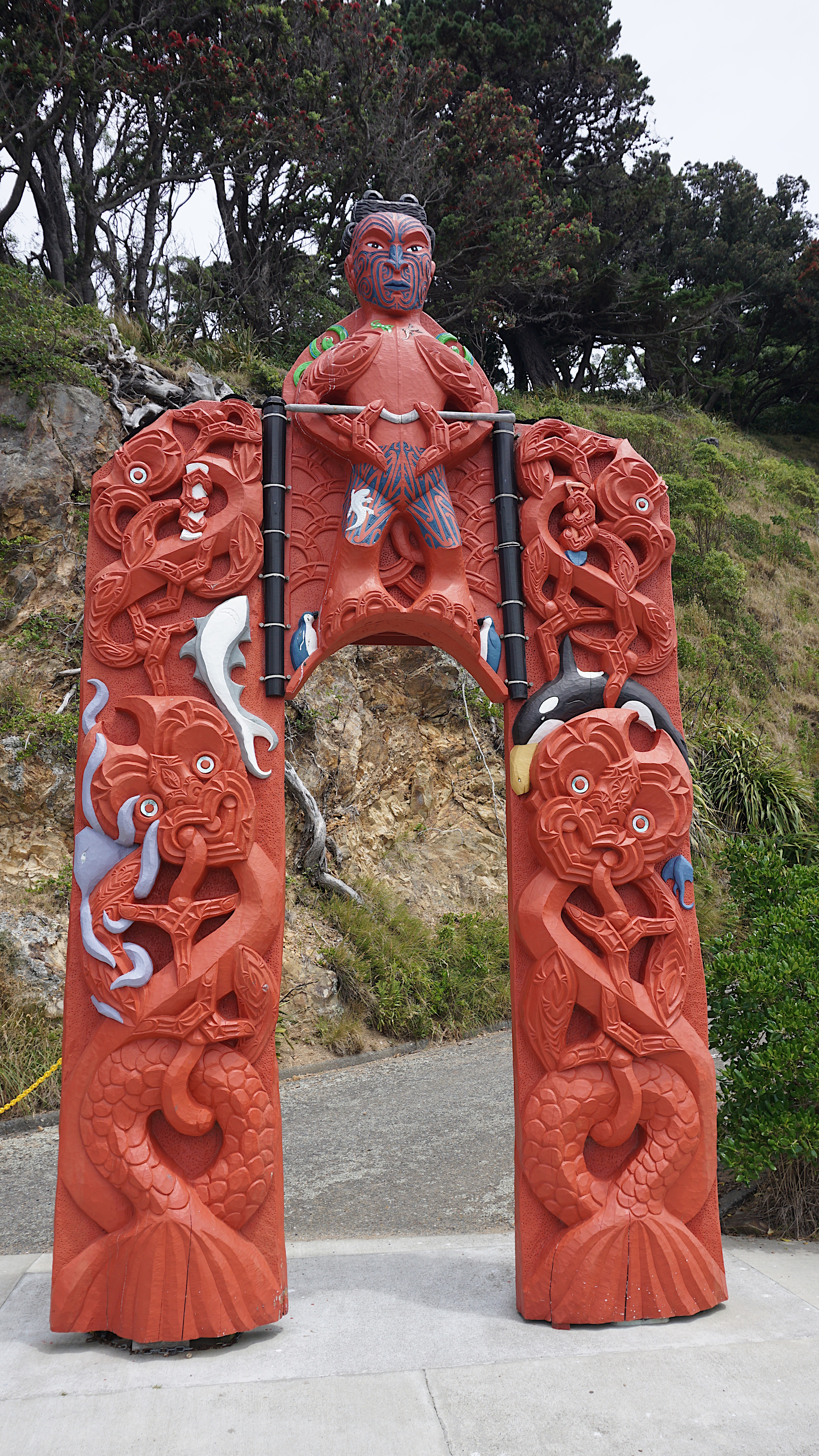
Waharoa (carved gateway) at Matiu / Somes Island

In 2009, ownership of the island was transferred to the Māori collective Taranaki Whānui ki Te Upoko o Te Ika. The transfer of ownership was part of cultural redress for Taranaki Whānui included in the settlement of their claims against the Crown for breaches of the Treaty of Waitangi. Following the passing of the Port Nicholson Block (Taranaki Whānui ki Te Upoko o Te Ika) Claims Settlement Act 2009, the island is owned by the trustees of the Port Nicholson Block Settlement Trust. A kaitiaki (management) plan was prepared in 2012, to guide the administration of the island's scientific and historic reserves in accordance with the Reserves Act 1977. A small team of rangers lives on the island to maintain facilities, manage visitors and volunteers, and monitor bait stations.

A waharoa (carved gateway) named Tane Te Waiora was unveiled next to the wharf at the entrance to the island in 2017.

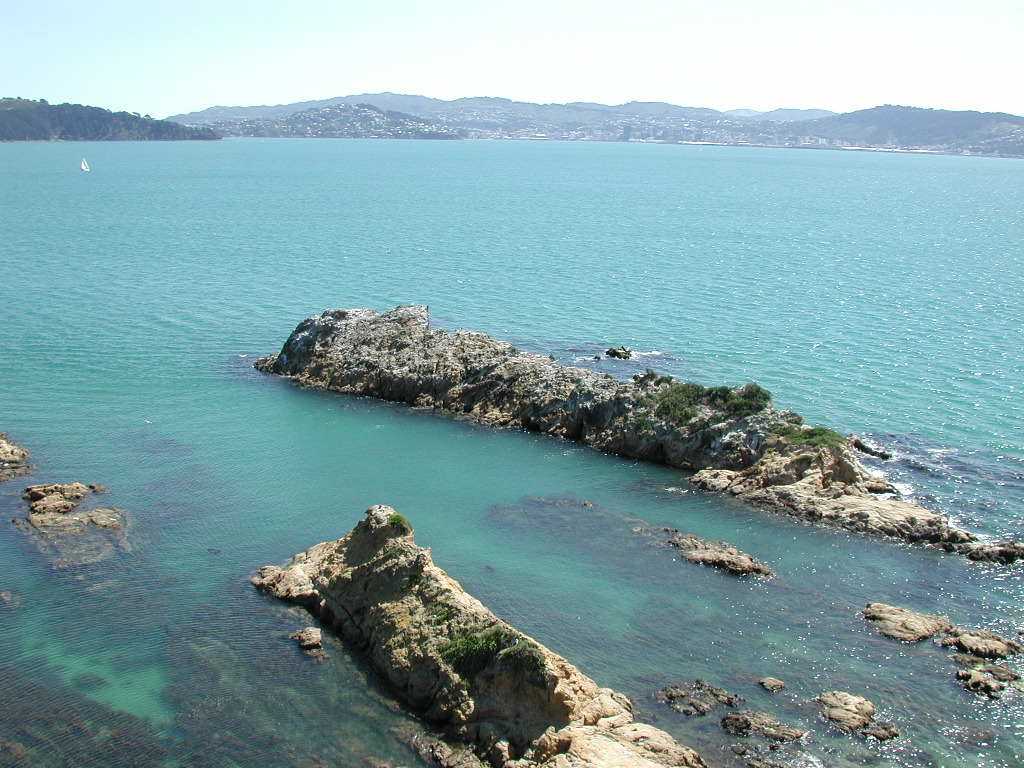
Shag rocks at southern end of Matiu / Somes Island

== Environmental restoration ==
=== Revegetation ===
In 1872, the island had few trees or shrubs. Sheep were grazed and quarantined on the island from 1851 onwards. During its time as a farm and quarantine station, much of Matiu / Somes Island was converted to pasture. The effects of grazing over a period of 125 years meant that by 1976 the island was mostly bare, with the exception of some exotic trees, including macrocarpa that had been planted for shelter. Native wildlife on the island was severely affected by the loss of habitat. In 1977, the Ministry of Works presented a landscaping plan to the Animal Health Division of the Ministry of Agriculture and Fisheries. The purpose of the plan was to provide screening and shelter of the accommodation and other buildings on the island, and to screen the oxidation ponds and rubbish dump. The plan proposed planting of a variety of native plants, along with more macrocarpa. A small number of trees were planted in 1977–78.

At about the same time, members of the Lower Hutt branch of the Royal Forest and Bird Protection Society became interested in revegetation of the island. They gained agreement to begin planting native plants on the island in the early 1980s. Access to the island was still strictly controlled at that time, because it was still a high security animal quarantine station. Over the period 1981–2008, the volunteers planted over 100,000 plants.

Species introduced or reintroduced to Matiu / Somes Island include Cook's scurvy grass, northern rātā, large-leaved milk tree, taupata, hebes, ngaio, and five finger. A volunteer group known as the Karo Busters spent ten years poisoning karo trees growing on the island, since this species does not occur naturally in the area. Many of these projects have been supported by the community and the local Māori collective, Taranaki Whānui ki te Upoko o te Ika.

=== Pest eradication ===
Rats and mice were successfully eradicated between 1988 and 1989. In 1990, it was the largest island that had been cleared of ship rats. There was a suspected intrusion by a mouse in 2012, but no further evidence was found. The Department of Conservation maintains a network of traps and tracking tunnels.

=== Reintroduction of birds ===
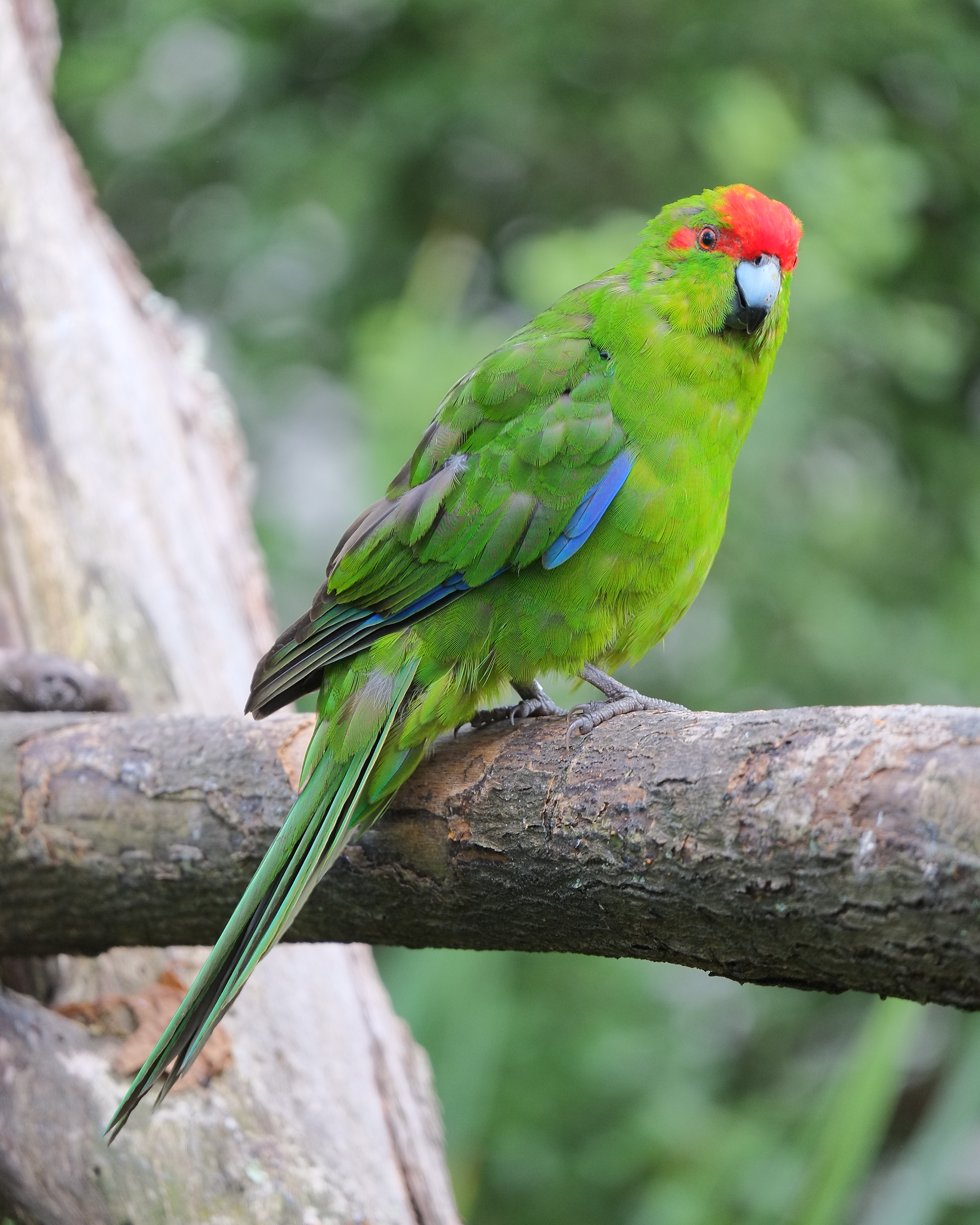
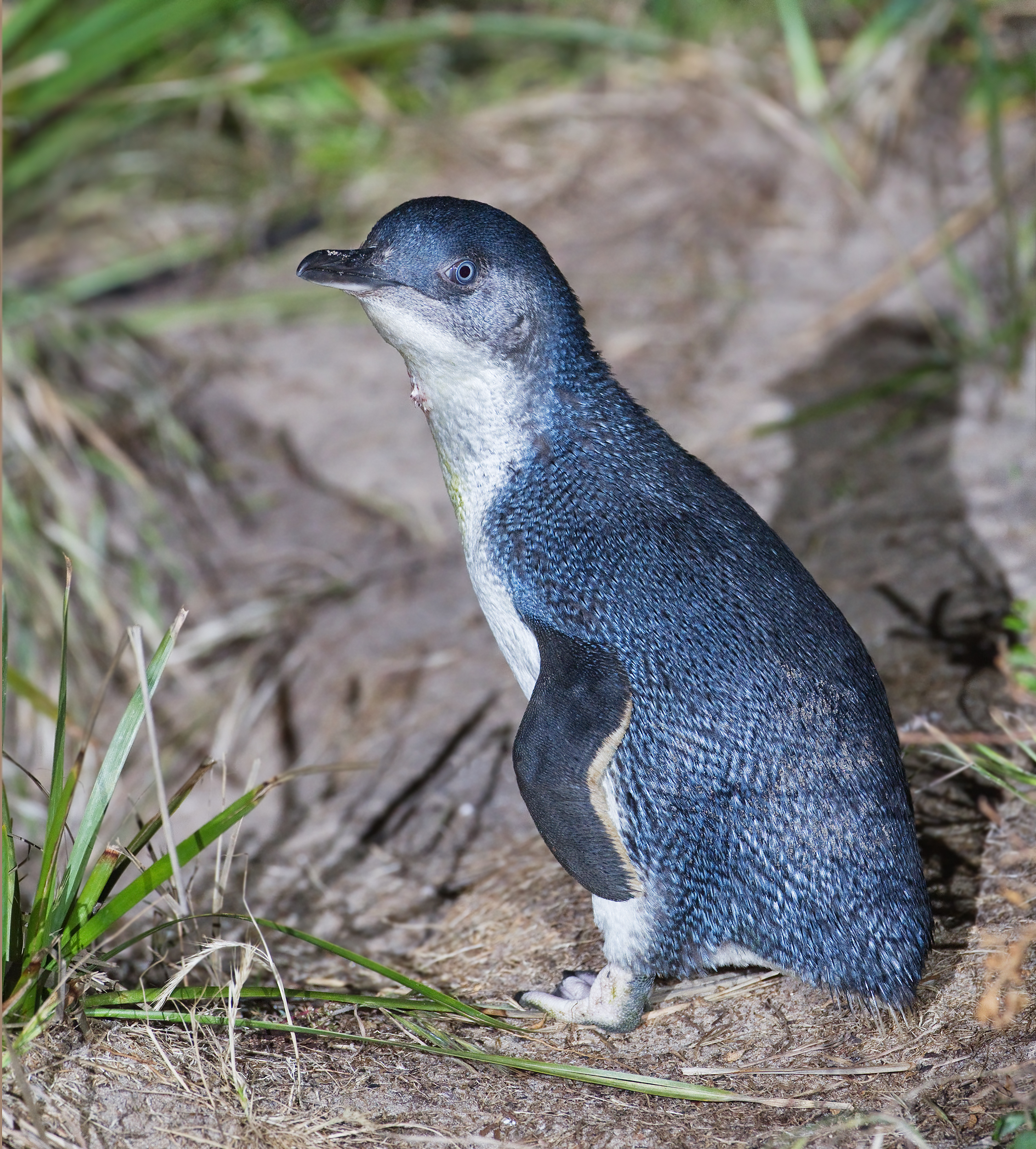
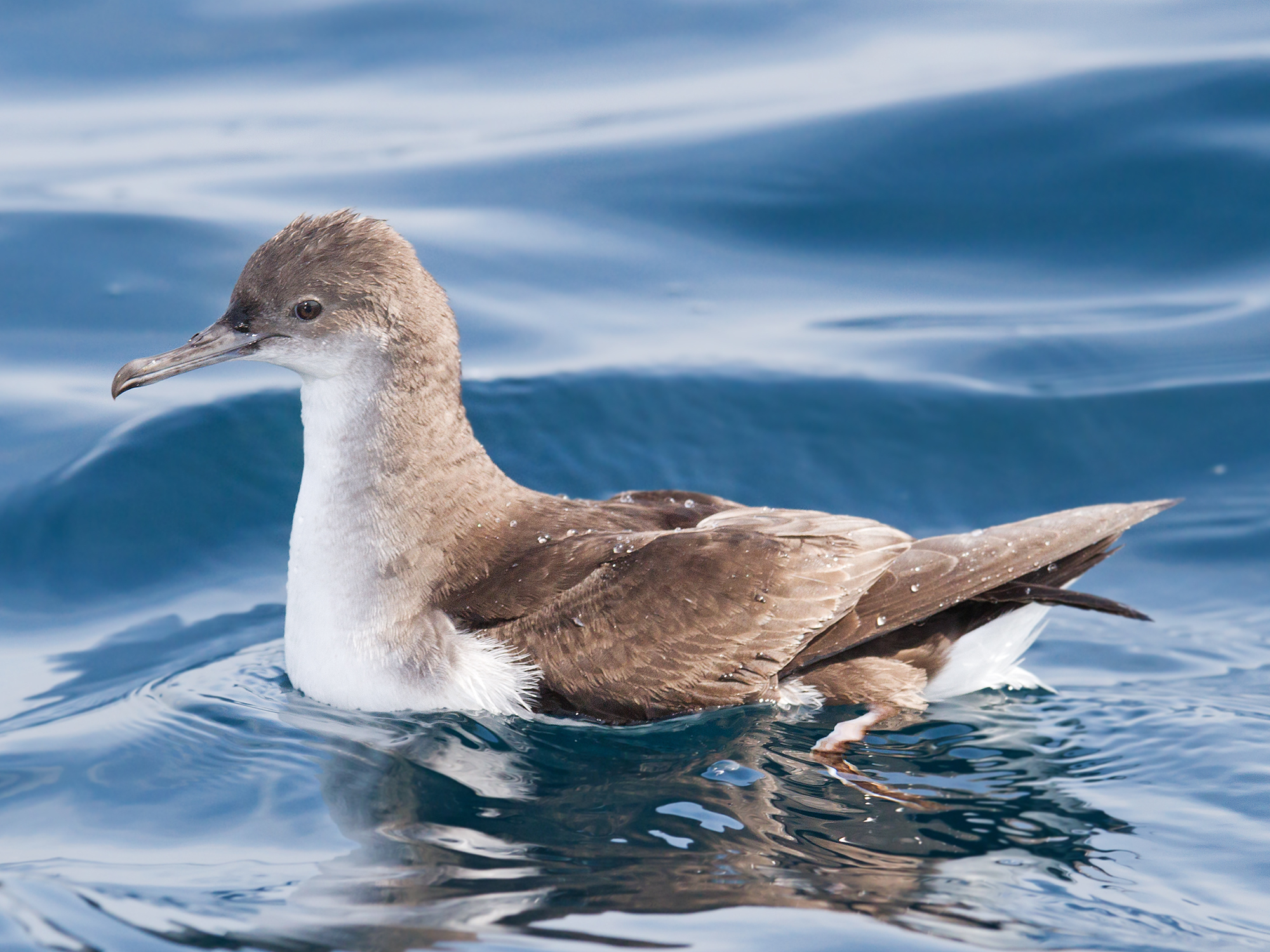
Birds reintroduced to Matiu / Somes Island: kākāriki, top-left; little blue penguin, top-right; fluttering shearwater, bottom.

Red-crowned kākāriki (parakeets) from Kapiti Island were successfully re-introduced in 2003 and 2004, and remain a common sight on the island. North Island robins sourced from Kapiti Island were released in April 2006. They bred for the first time in late September that year and this appeared to indicate that the island ecosystem was a suitable habitat for this species. However, the robins did not thrive, possibly because the regenerating forest does not yet provide sufficient damp leaf litter year-round to sustain an adequate population of invertebrates as food.

Little blue penguins breed on the island, and the population is closely monitored. Their numbers have increased significantly since the revegetation of the island. To help support penguin breeding, over 170 artificial nest boxes have been provided. However, in the 2020/21 season, there was high mortality of penguin chicks, attributed to starvation caused by warmer sea temperatures making it more difficult for adults to find and catch fish. Normal chick mortality is around 11% but the figure for 2020/21 was 35%.

Between 2012 and 2014, 237 fluttering shearwater chicks were translocated from the Marlborough Sounds to Matiu / Somes Island and hand-fed until they fledged. Some of the now-adult birds have since returned to the island and begun to breed. A solar-powered speaker system was installed to transmit fluttering shearwater calls each night, and has attracted wild birds to Matiu / Somes Island. This species is common in Wellington Harbour but there has been no local breeding population since pre-European times. They were once an important food source for local iwi. During the 2024/2025 breeding season, researchers monitoring the colony handled 94 birds, and recorded 40 eggs laid and 37 chicks fledged, representing a 93% breeding success rate. The net growth of the colony between 2001 and 2004 was an average of 2.8 birds per year, with productivity limited by an imbalance of males and females. The survival rates of fledglings from Matiu / Somes Island have been reduced by crash landings caused by light pollution.

The island is also a stronghold for other seabirds including the spotted shag and black shag, and the red-billed gull.

=== Reintroduction of invertebrates ===
There are more than 500 species of invertebrates on the island, including three species of wētā. Wellington tree wētā were transferred to Matiu / Somes Island in 1996 and 1997, and 67 Cook Strait giant wētā were successfully transferred from Mana Island in 1996. A species of small ground wētā had survived on Matiu / Somes Island after deforestation.

=== Reintroduction of reptiles ===
The island is now home to several species of native reptiles, including the common skink, spotted skink, copper skink and common gecko. Twenty-five forest geckos were transferred to the island in April 2005, and more than 90 Wellington green geckos were released in several transfers between 2006 and 2013. Two of these geckos were fitted with transmitters so that they could be monitored after release. In 2015 the green geckos were confirmed to be breeding on the island. Tuatara are known to have been living on Matiu / Somes island in the 1840s but later died out. In 1998, around 50 Brothers Island tuatara were released on Matiu / Somes Island, and by 2007 some had begun breeding there.

=== Matiu / Somes Island Charitable Trust ===
The Matiu / Somes Island Charitable Trust was established in 1999 and launched in March 2000 as a partnership between local iwi and the general community to help protect, nurture and enhance the island by raising funds for projects that increase biodiversity and enhance visitors' enjoyment of the island. Through its active arm, "The Friends of Matiu / Somes", it encourages community participation in work on the island. It also works closely with DOC and community groups such as Forest & Bird.

=== Maintaining biosecurity ===
Visitors to the island are required to pass through the whare kiore ('rat house') building at the wharf at the northeast of the island after disembarking, to check their bags for pest animals, plants, seeds and soil.

== Transport ==
Scheduled ferry services from the Wellington CBD to Matiu / Somes Island and Days Bay operate as part of ferries in Wellington, landing at the main wharf at the northeast of the island. An electric ferry was introduced in 2022. Visitors arriving in private boats may only land at the main wharf or nearby beach.

In January 2024, the Kaitiaki Board governing the island announced that public access to the island would be closed for 6–8 months while the wharf was rebuilt.

== Tourism ==
Matiu / Somes Island is an increasingly popular tourist attraction and educational resource for local schools, with about 15,000 visitors per year. Visitors may stay overnight on the island in one of two houses managed by the Department of Conservation (Education House built in the 1970s or the historic caretakers' cottage), or in a tent at one of 12 campsites.

Just to the north lies a much smaller island, Mokopuna Island. To protect endemic wildlife on Mokopuna Island – particularly nesting seabirds – landing by members of the public is prohibited.

== Lighthouse ==
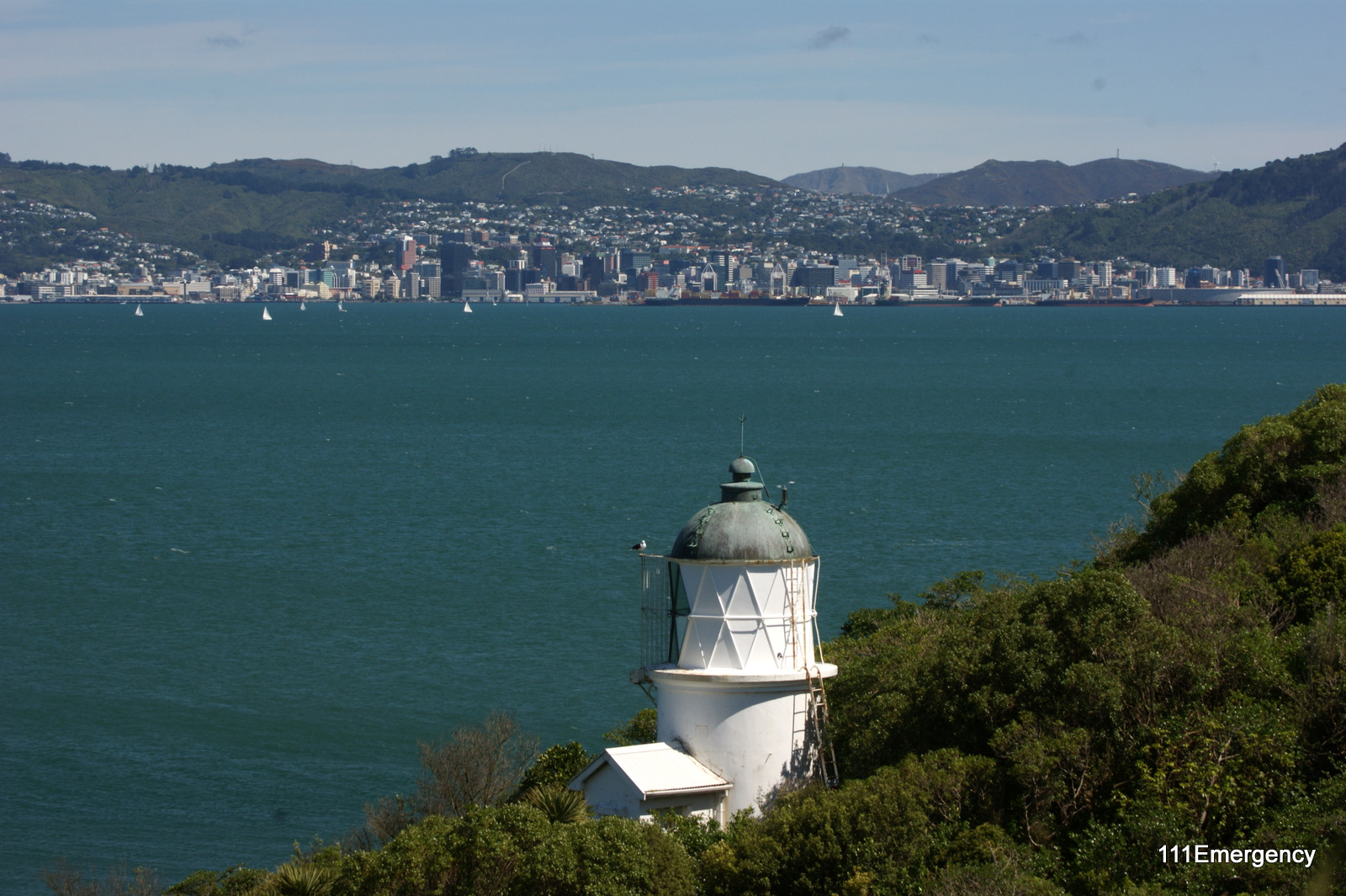
Lighthouse with Wellington City in the background

The Matiu / Somes Island lighthouse is a harbour navigation light for Wellington Harbour. It is a sector light, marking a safe approach through the harbour channel. The first lighthouse on the site was established in 1866. It was the first inner harbour lighthouse in New Zealand, and one of only eight lighthouses nationwide at that time. However, by 1895 there were multiple complaints that it was inadequate. A replacement lighthouse with a more powerful light was built on an adjacent site and commissioned on 21 February 1900. The light was automated on 1 April 1924 and converted to electricity after 1945. The lighthouse is owned and operated by the Greater Wellington Regional Council.

== In the arts ==
Award-winning New Zealand novelist Maurice Gee's novel Live Bodies was set in part on Matiu / Somes Island, with the main character spending time interned there during the Second World War.

Oscar Kightley is a Samoan-born New Zealand actor, television presenter, writer, journalist, director, and comedian. In 1998, he co-wrote and performed in a play, Eulogy, that was based on the story of Samoan and German prisoners interned on the island during the Second World War.

New Zealand author of children's fiction Melanie Drewery's picture book for children, Papa's Island, tells the story of a family caught up in the internment of "enemy aliens" on Matiu / Somes Island.

New Zealand author of fiction and non-fiction David McGill's spy novel The Death Ray Debacle is based on a true story about Victor Penny, an Auckland bus garage attendant and amateur radio enthusiast who in 1935 managed to convince government authorities that he could produce a 'death ray' that was capable of stopping an army, immobilising trucks, and bringing down enemy aeroplanes in flight. Penny was placed under the protection of defence authorities initially on Matiu / Somes Island and later at Fort Dorset, a military coastal defence battery in Seatoun.

In 2013 Wellington theatre company Bard Productions staged an adaptation of Shakespeare's The Tempest on Matiu / Somes Island, with the boat journey across to the island forming part of the play. Scenes took place at the former animal quarantine station and in the open air.

== See also ==
- List of islands of New Zealand
