= Bard Productions =

Theatre company in New Zealand

- Formation: 2007
- Type: Theatre group
- Purpose: Site-specific and 'adventure theatre'
- Location: Wellington, New Zealand
- Notable members: Frogs Under the Waterfront, Quarantine, A Tempest off Matiu-Somes Island

Bard Productions, based in Wellington, New Zealand, is a theatre company best known for offering site-specific and 'adventure theatre.' The company has been in operation since 2007.

== Performances ==
Frogs Under the Waterfront, an adaptation of Aristophanes' The Frogs, was the company's first successful site-specific production. The performance took place underneath the Wellington waterfront, with the audience in paddle boats. The company won a number of awards for the production and attracted significant local and national media attention.

Two years later the company produced Quarantine, a show about the human quarantine patients who lived and died on Matiu-Somes Island in the Wellington harbour. The audience was taken to the island at night in a chartered ferry, and the performance itself took place in the forests of the island and in an historical quarantine building.

In 2013 A Tempest off Matiu-Somes Island, an adaptation of Shakespeare's The Tempest held in a chartered ferry which took audience members to the island and in a large animal quarantine station abandoned in the 1980s.

In 2014 the company mounted a return season of "A Tempest off Matiu-Somes Island". It was made public in January 2014 that the company had joined with the New Zealand Department of Conservation and the Kaitiaki Board to secure a 10-year concession to stage theatrical events and performances on Matiu-Somes Island during the summer months.

== Other projects ==
In mid-2013 the company expanded to Melbourne, Australia and opened up the corporate teambuilding and murder mystery branch of the company, CluedUp Unique Events.
