= Lundie Kirk =

Church building in Lundie, Scotland

Coordinates: 56°30′58.1″N 3°09′16.0″W

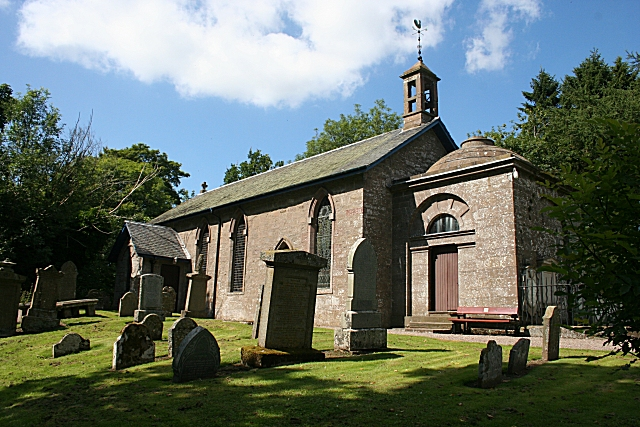
Pictured in 2010

Lundie Kirk was the parish church of Lundie, Angus, in Scotland from the 12th century until 2017. The church was constructed in Romanesque style in the 12th century and was owned by the Priory of St Andrews for whom it may have served as a rest stop for travelling monks. The church came into the ownership of the Duncan family in 1660. A mausoleum at the east end of the structure was added in 1789 to house the body of Sir William Duncan, 1st Baronet and Admiral Adam Duncan, 1st Viscount Duncan was buried in the graveyard. The church was partly rebuilt in 1846 and a significant renovation was carried out in 1892, converting the mausoleum to a vestry and adding a porch. The church is a Category A listed building.

The Church of Scotland ceased holding regular worship in June 2017 and, after an unsuccessful search for a community use, the church was sold in 2019. The church was sold again by auction in November 2021, achieving a price of £40,000. The new owner intended to convert the structure into a family home. The structure suffered a serious fire on 18 November 2022, leaving it a roofless shell.

== Description ==
The main part of the church, the oldest surviving portion, was built in the Romanesque style on a small rise in the village. It is constructed of coarse square stones, except for the west gable which is of rubble stone. Its roof was slate.

The south is the principal elevation and consists of six bays; the porch and entrance being in the second bay from the left. The windows are pointed arches with moulding above. The west elevation is completely plain apart from a central buttress. In front of the north elevation are steps leading to a basement, protected by iron railings and a gate. In the centre of the elevation a chimneybreast protrudes from the wall and pierces the roof, terminating in a square, corniced chimney stack. The north elevation has a single narrow pointed window, known as the leper window, to the left of the chimney and, below this, a blocked-up coal hole.

The east elevation is dominated by the vestry, originally built as a mausoleum for the Duncan family, and adjoining the east of the main church structure. Square in plan it has a single door on the south elevation. This has wide-corniced jambs and is surmounted by a corniced lintel and a fanlight with intrados surround. In the other two external walls blank round-headed panels are set centrally to each elevation. The vestry has a stone domed roof with a tholobate. At the east end of the main church structure a bellcote sits on the roof, containing a single bell. It is birdcage in style and surmounted by a ball finial and weathervane.

The interior of the church was boarded in pitch pine on the walls and ceiling, described as unusually extensive. There were wooden pews and a timber-panelled pulpit, hexagonal in plan and sat on a plinth. A stone columnar font was used. The church held a wrought-iron memorial to John Robert Lester, who served as minister from 1953 to 1977, and stained-glass memorial window to the Hunter family of nearby Easter Keith. A sculpture opposite the leper window depicted the tree of life. The north wall held a war memorial dating to 1897 and a brass panel commemorating the 1892 renovation of the church. The door leading to the vestry at the east end was flanked with panels showing extracts from the psalms and the Lord's Prayer.

The churchyard is surrounded by a rubble-built wall of around 2 metres (6 ft 7 in) in height. The grounds contain burials from the 18th to 20th centuries. A burial plot, enclosed by a low wall and wrought-iron railings, was used by the Duncan family.

== Ecclesiastical history ==
The church was constructed by the Durward family, who owned the village, in the 12th century. Its earliest mention in the written record dates to the reign of William the Lion (r. 1165–1214). The church was originally owned by the Priory of St Andrews and may have served as a resting place for monks on the road between the priory and Coupar Angus. The church has been dedicated to Saint Lawrence since the 12th century.

From 1618 the parish was united with that of the village of Fowlis Easter, which appears to be the first such union in Church of Scotland history, and the minister's manse was built at Lundie. Lundie became part of the Duncan family estate in 1660. Sir William Duncan, 1st Baronet (died 1774) achieved prominence as physician to George III. Duncan's wife, Lady Mary Tufton, demolished the church's apse and erected in its place a neo-classical mausoleum for her husband. Above the door is the Latin inscription "COEMETERIUM GULIELMI DUNCAN EQ AURAT ET BARONETTI MEDICI REGII MDCCLXXXIX" ('Burial place of William Duncan, knight bachelor and baronet, physician to the King 1789'). Lady Mary was also interred in the mausoleum after her death.

William Duncan's nephew Admiral Adam Duncan, 1st Viscount Duncan succeeded to the estate on 20 December 1796. Duncan had won a naval victory over the Dutch at the 11 October 1797 Battle of Camperdown. For many years the church used the bell of the Dutch ship Vrijheid, captured by Duncan at Camperdown. Its whereabouts are unknown, the current bell is inscribed 1617 and is by Michael Burgerhuys of Holland. Duncan was ordained as elder of the church in 1800. He is buried in the Duncan burial ground.

The church was partially rebuilt in 1846. A significant renovation was carried out by Scottish architect Thomas Saunders Robertson in 1892. The entrance porch and bellcote were added at this time. The bodies were removed from the mausoleum and buried in the Duncan plot and the mausoleum converted into a vestry. The interior boarding was added and new pews and pulpit installed. In 1894 the Hunter family stained-glass window was installed.

In 1952 Fowlis Easter was split from the parish, being joined to Liff, and Lundie was joined with Muirhead. Electric lights and heating were installed in 1958 and the pulpit relocated. On 11 June 1971 the church was designated a listed building, it is currently classified as Category A, the highest classification, on the basis of its Romanesque masonry and the mausoleum. In October 1997 the church hosted events to commemorate the bicentenary of the Battle of Camperdown .

== Sale and fire ==
The last regular worship was held in the church in June 2017, though the Church of Scotland continued to make occasional use of the structure until 2019 for Christmas worship and at least one funeral. In 2019 Historic Churches Scotland were asked by the Church of Scotland to look for community uses for the church. The community consultation failed to provide a viable alternative use for the structure and it was sold by the church later that year.

The purchaser resold the church in a 6-hour online auction on 18 November 2021 with a guide price of £29,000–£39,000. It was purchased for £40,000 by an anonymous buyer. The new owner intended to convert the building into a family home. On 18 November 2022 the church was hit by a serious fire that destroyed many internal features and left the building "a charred roofless shell". The fire destroyed some artefacts relating to Admiral Duncan, though the mausoleum and burial ground escaped significant damage.
