= Lundie Craigs =

- Westerkeith Hill

Highest point
- Elevation: 353 m (1,158 ft)
- Coordinates: 56°31′37″N 3°10′13″W

Geography
- Location: Perth & Kinross, Scotland
- Parent range: Sidlaw Hills
- Topo map: OS Landranger 53

Climbing
- Easiest route: Walk on path to summit

Lundie Craigs/Westerkeith Hill is one of the hills of the Sidlaw range in South East Perthshire.

Lundie Craigs/Westerkeith Hill is located near Coupar Angus and is quite popular to dog walkers and hill walkers.
