= Ann Mills =

18th-century British woman sailor

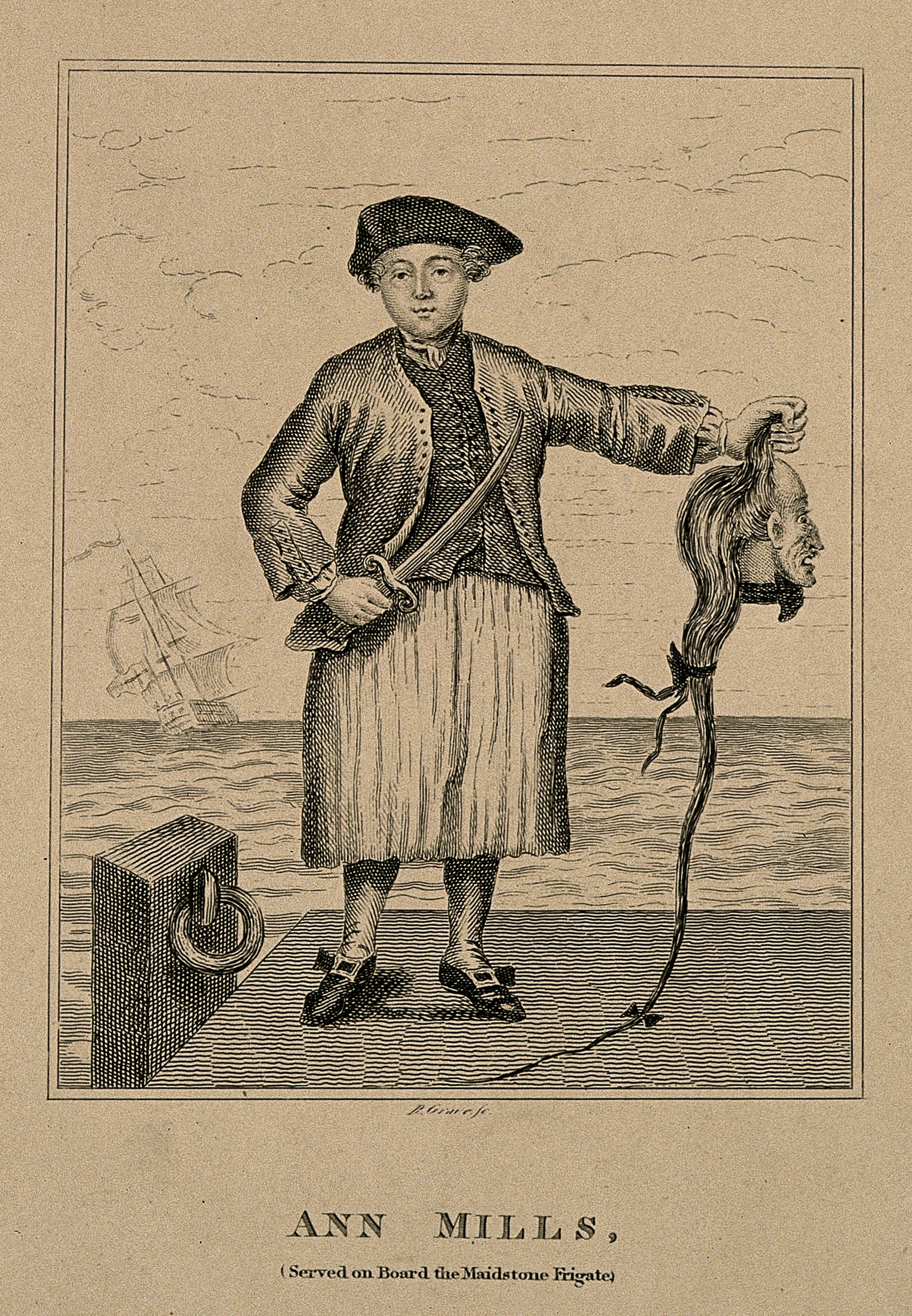
- Allegiance: United Kingdom
- Branch: British Army
- Conflicts: War of the Austrian Succession

Ann Mills (sometimes spelled Anne) was a British woman who disguised herself as a man in order to become a dragoon. In 1740, she fought on the frigate HMS Maidstone.
