= Mākaro / Ward Island =

Island in New Zealand

Mākaro/Ward
Mākaro (Māori)
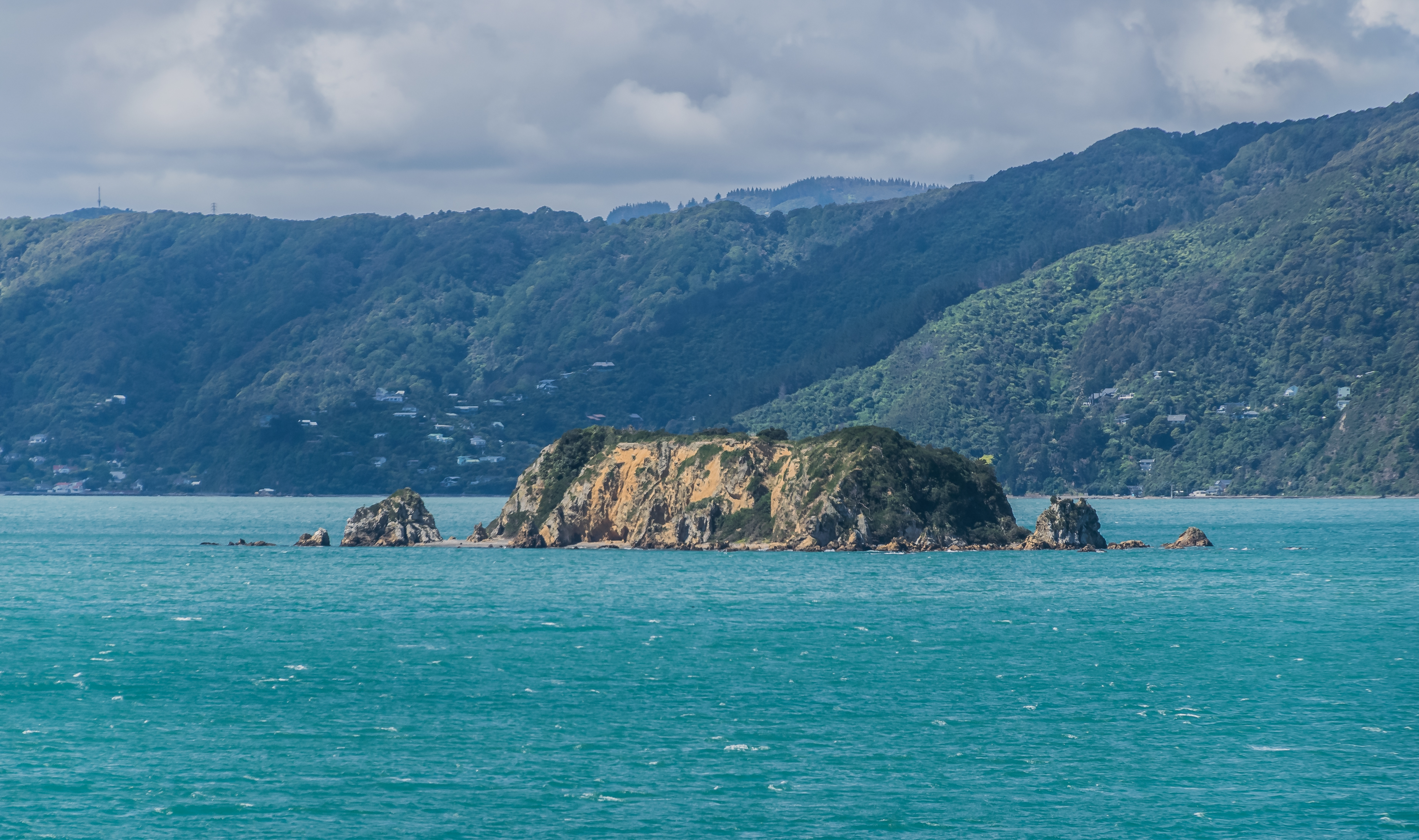

- Location within New Zealand Wellington

Geography
- Location: Wellington Harbour
- Coordinates: 41.293849°S 174.871514°E
- Length: 250 m (820 ft)
- Width: 80 m (260 ft)
- Highest elevation: 20 m (70 ft)

Administration
- New Zealand

Mākaro / Ward island is one of the three small islands in Wellington Harbour, at the southern end of the North Island, New Zealand.

Ward Island is on the eastern side of the harbour, about 1.7 kilometres (1.1 mi) west of the town of Eastbourne. It is about 250 metres (270 yd) long and 80 metres (87 yd) wide, with the long axis aligned north–south. The significantly larger Matiu / Somes Island lies about 5 km (3.1 mi) northwest.

== Etymology ==
The name Mākaro is derived from a story in Māori mythology that Kupe named the two islands in Wellington Harbour after two of his daughters, nieces, or granddaughters. Ward Island is named after the deputy-governor of the New Zealand Company. In 1997 the New Zealand Geographic Board assigned the official bilingual name of Makaro/Ward island.

== History ==
The bulk of Ward Island consists of a steep sided block of yellowy/brown argilite, with a more or less flat top. There is a beach of greywacke shingle along the east side of the island. The rest of the coastline is rocky except for a pair of smaller beaches on the western side, backed by cliffs about 20m high. Numerous small reefs surround the island, particularly at the southern end. The main shipping channel to the ports of Wellington and Seaview passes to the west of Ward Island. The passage between Ward and Eastbourne is too shallow for vessels of any size.

The island has been used as a defence work in both ancient and modern times. A Ngāti Ira pā of refuge (which as such was not usually inhabited) existed on the island in the early 19th century. There was no construction there – the island itself, with its sheer cliffs, served as the refuge. During the Second World War a 1.8 km (1.1 mi) wooden piled anti-submarine barrier was built between Robinson Bay and the eastern shore of the island, and a net suspended from buoys extended from the western side of the island to Kau Point on the western harbour shore. Other than a few concrete blocks on the western side of the island there are no remains of these extensive structures to be seen today.

The island is a popular destination for recreational watercraft of all kinds. The reefs and the rocky coast provide good fishing and snorkelling opportunities. Off the southern end, beds of seaweed provide shelter for abundant fish life and opportunities for collecting edible shellfish such as pāua and green lipped mussels.

Makaro Street in Eastbourne is named after the island, which can be seen at the seaward end of its short east–west length.

== The island ecosystem ==
Ward Island is a designated DOC scientific reserve and as such, camping, fires and dogs are not permitted there.

The island is home to a small population of seagulls and other seabirds, which nest on the steep slopes of the island. The island is otherwise uninhabited.

As an ongoing measure to ensure that a rodent population does not become established, DOC has been maintaining bait stations filled with pellets containing Brodifacoum poison on the island since 2005.

== See also ==
- List of islands of New Zealand
- List of islands
- Desert island
