= Sir James the Rose =

Traditional song

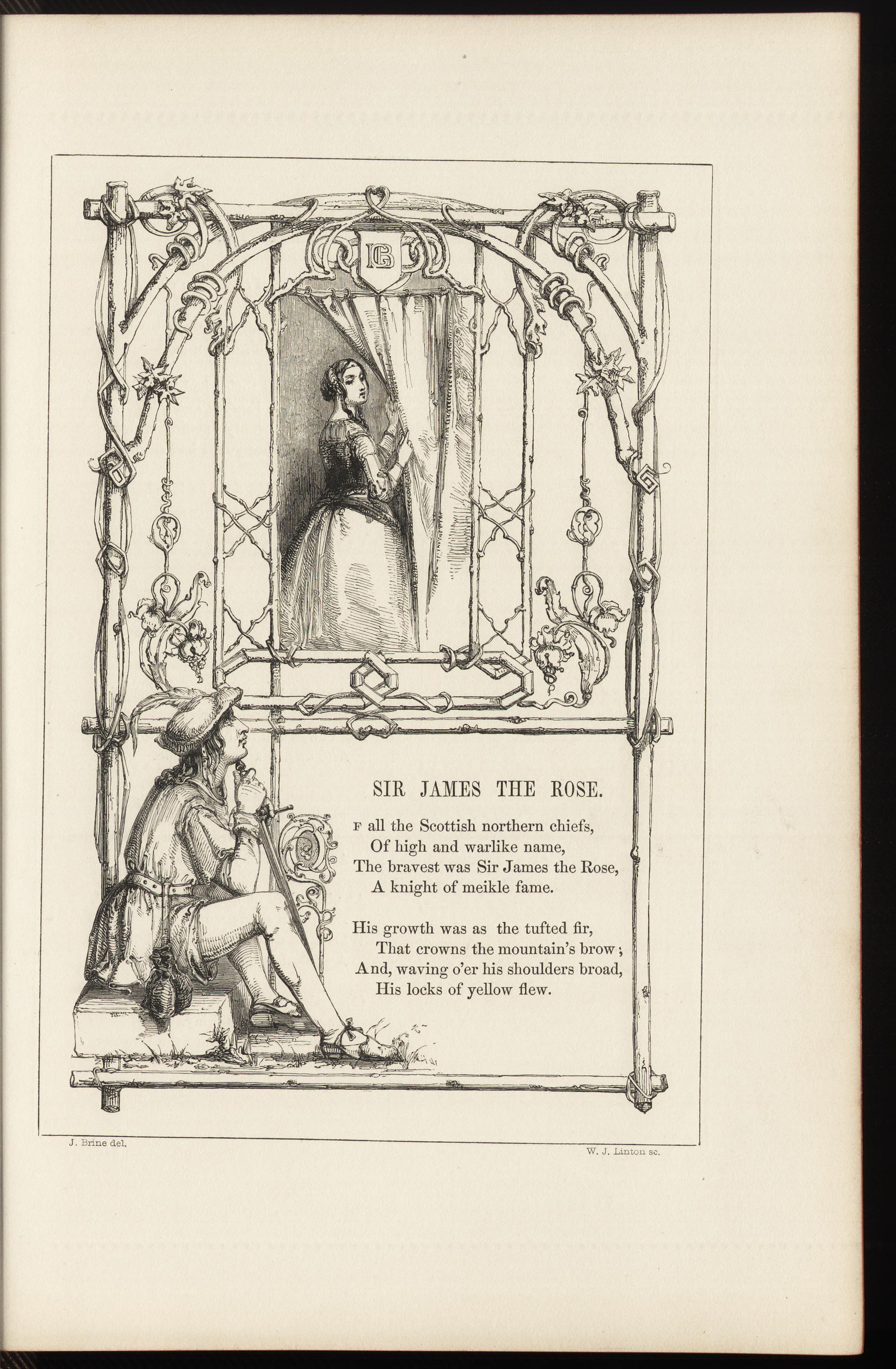
- "Sir James the Rose" in The Book of British Ballads (1842)

Song
- Genre: Folk

Sir James the Rose is Child ballad 213. It was published as a broadside ballad.

== Synopsis ==
The broadside opens with the account of Sir James the Rose's love for a lady named Matilda, how her family tried to marry her off, and how he killed her brother for spying on them.

Child's version merely opens with the news that Sir James the Rose killed a squire and asked his lover to hide him.

In both versions, the woman tells him where to spend the night and eventually betrays him to those seeking to avenge the death. James is killed, and she, full of remorse for her deed, dies of grief.

== See also ==
- The Duke of Athole's Nurse

== Versions ==
- Steeleye Span recorded a version of this song on the album Rocket Cottage. It can also be found on the collection Original Masters. A later rerecording of it is on their album Present.
