= Brown Robin =

Traditional song

Brown Robin (Roud 62, Child 97) is a traditional English-language folk song. The ballad tells the story of a king's daughter who brings her lover, Brown Robin, into the castle and back out without being discovered by the king. The second variant comes from the ballad "Love Robbie."

== History ==
=== "Love Robbie" ===
The second variant in Child's Popular English and Scottish Ballads comes from the ballad "Love Robbie," which dates to as far back as the mid-18th century. William Christie collected the ballad in Buckie, Banffshire, from a Scottish woman whose father and grandfather originally sang the ballad. Her father was a well-known ballad-singer, given the name "Meesic' (Music) "given to him in the end of [the 18th] century by the populace.

== Synopsis ==
A king's daughter waits on the table at supper and she falls in love with Brown Robin. She gets her father and the porter drunk and takes Robin to her bower. They stay until morning, but he does not think he can escape. After she persuades her father to let her and her maids gather flowers in the woods, she dresses Brown Robin as one of them. They comment that he makes a sturdy lady but let him go.

In some variants, the tale ends there. In others, the porter shoots Brown Robin, and the king hangs him at his daughter's request. In still others, the daughter goes with Brown Robin, and the porter arranges her reconciliation with her father, for which she settles money on him.
