= The Duke of Athole's Nurse =

Traditional song

The Duke of Athole's Nurse is #212 of the Child Ballads, the collection of 305 ballads from England and Scotland, and their American variants, collected by Francis James Child in the late nineteenth century. The collection was published as The English and Scottish Popular Ballads between 1882 and 1898 by Houghton Mifflin in ten volumes and later reissued in a five volume edition.

== Synopsis ==
A man looks to meet his love—sometimes through the intermediary of the Duke of Athole's nurse—and is directed to wait for her at an inn; she will come in the morning. Armed men come instead.

In most variants, he pleads with the innkeeper, who dresses him as a woman and sets him baking, so that the men do not find him.

== See also ==
- Sir James the Rose
