= Hjelmar von Danneville =

Danish prisoner in New Zealand during World War I

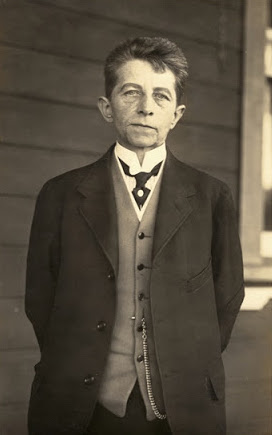
- von Danneville pictured between 1914 and 1917.
- Born: 1860; Denmark
- Died: 17 February 1930 (aged 69–70); San Francisco, CA
- Other names: Hjelmar von Dannevill; Hjelmar Danneville

Dr. Hjelmar von Danneville (1860-1930) was a prisoner in New Zealand suspected of being an imposter during World War I due to her gender non-conformity.

== Life ==
Born in Denmark in 1860, she arrived in Wellington in 1911, claiming to have studied medicine in Switzerland. She also claimed to have been a correspondent working on the Russo-Japanese War in 1905.

Because of her short hair, masculine style of dress, and foreign accent, von Danneville was suspected of being a German imposter by the New Zealand authorities during World War I. She was subjected to a forced medical examination by the military to determine her sex, and was interned for six weeks on Matiu/Somes Island in Wellington Harbour in 1917. She was the only woman to be interned on the island.

von Danneville moved to San Francisco in 1918, where she continued to fight with local authorities - including her arrest in 1925 "for masquerading as a man" - but ultimately obtained a permit to wear masculine clothes. She died in San Francisco in 1930.

Based on her personal letters, modern historians have suspected that von Danneville may have been a lesbian.

== In popular culture ==
von Danneville was the subject of an exhibition at Wellington's Enjoy Public Art Gallery in 2018.

Her story was featured in a 2019 non-fiction book by historian Jared Davidson, Dead Letters: Censorship and Subversion in New Zealand 1914–1920 and in a 2021 biography Spies and lies: the mysterious Dr Dannevill.
