= Gude Wallace =

Traditional song

Gude Wallace (Roud 75, Child 157) is a traditional English-language folk song, recounting in ballad form an exploit of William Wallace from the fourth book of Blind Harry's The Wallace. There are a number of variants, including two different stories.

== Synopsis ==
In one set of variants, the Englishmen threaten his mistress to make her betray him. When he arrives, she confesses. He forgives her, borrows her clothing, and makes his escape. In some of these, the ballad then goes on to include the events in the other set.

In another, Wallace asks a woman for news, hears of English soldiers hunting for him, goes up to them in disguise and kills a number, and returns home to dine with his men.
