= Taranaki Whānui ki te Upoko o te Ika =

Māori collective in Wellington, New Zealand

Taranaki Whānui ki te Upoko o te Ika is a Māori collective that was formed to lodge claims with the Waitangi Tribunal relating to the New Zealand Company's purchase of land in the vicinity of Wellington in 1839 and 1844. Following on from the Tribunal's 2003 report WAI145, a settlement of these claims was signed in 2008 between the New Zealand Government and the collective.

The collective comprises people of the iwi of Te Āti Awa, Taranaki, Ngāti Ruanui, Ngāti Tama and others including Ngāti Mutunga from a number of Taranaki iwi whose ancestors migrated to Wellington in the 1820s and 30s and who signed the 1839 Port Nicholson Block Deed of Purchase. Port Nicholson is the historic name for Wellington Harbour but the 1839 Deed of Purchase, extended in 1844, covered much of the area known as Te Upoko o te Ika. The rohe (tribal area) includes land surrounding the harbour, and extends to the Remutaka Range north of the Hutt Valley, and then south to Turakirae. To the west, the rohe includes the south-west corner of the North Island, up to Tawa.

In February 2022, during the 2022 Wellington protests, leaders of Taranaki Whānui called for protestors to end their occupation of the grounds of Parliament and the surrounding streets, because of threats made against kuia and kaumatua who had been contributing to the response to the COVID-19 pandemic.

== Port Nicholson Block Settlement Trust ==
The Port Nicholson Block Settlement Trust was established in August 2008 to receive and manage the Treaty settlement package for Taranaki Whānui ki Te Upoko o Te Ika. This package includes:

• An agreed historical account and Crown acknowledgements, which form the basis for a Crown Apology to Taranaki Whānui ki Te Upoko o Te Ika, as well as a Statement of Forgiveness from Taranaki Whānui ki Te Upoko o Te Ika to the Crown;
• Cultural redress; and
• Financial and commercial redress.
