= Ecological area =

Type of New Zealand protected area

An ecological area is a type of New Zealand protected area. They are usually large (1,000 to 5,000 hectares) and usually feature the main ecosystems of a defined ecological district. There are currently 57 recognised ecological areas in New Zealand.

Like sanctuary areas, most ecological areas were set aside by the now defunct New Zealand Forest Service in the 1970s and 1980s in response to activism by the conservationist movement. Historically, ecological areas have mostly been in Southland and the West Coast of the South Island, and the Bay of Plenty Region of the North Island.

Ecological areas are usually accessible to the general public, but dogs are prohibited.

== North Island ==
=== Auckland Region ===
- Omaha Ecological Area

=== Waikato Region ===
- Hapuakohe Ecological Area
- Kapowai Ecological Area
- Moehau Ecological Area
- Otahu Ecological Area
- Papakai Ecological Area
- Raepahu Fernbird Ecological Area
- Taumatatawhero Ecological Area
- Waihaha Ecological Area
- Waiomu Ecological Area
- Whenuakura Ecological Area

=== Manawatū-Whanganui Region ===
- Manakau Ecological Area
- Maramataha Ecological Area
- Pukepoto Ecological Area
- Rotokuru Ecological Area
- Whenuakura Ecological Area

=== Wellington Region ===
- Manakau Ecological Area
- Penn Creek Ecological Area

== South Island ==
=== Tasman District ===
- Mokihinui Forks Ecological Area

=== West Coast Region ===
- Ahaura Terraces Ecological Area
- Atbara-Nile Ecological Area
- Bell Hill - Granite Hill Ecological Area
- Berlins Bluff Ecological Area
- Blackwater River Ecological Area
- Bywash Pakihi Ecological Area
- Card Creek Ecological Area
- Coal Creek Ecological Area
- Deadman Ecological Area
- Deep Creek Ecological Area
- Doctor Hill Ecological Area
- Flagstaff Ecological Area
- Fletcher Creek Ecological Area
- Glasseye Creek Ecological Area
- Granville Ecological Area
- Greenstone Ecological Area
- Kakapotahi Ecological Area
- Kaniere Ecological Area
- Karamea Bluff Ecological Area
- Lake Hochstetter Ecological Area
- Lower Poerua Ecological Area
- Mokihinui Forks Ecological Area
- Moonlight Ecological Area
- Mount Harata Ecological Area
- Nancys Clearing Ecological Area
- Ngakawau Ecological Area
- Okarito Forks Ecological Area
- Orikaka Ecological Area
- Oroko Swamp Ecological Area
- Otututu Ecological Area
- Radcliffe Ecological Area
- Roaring Meg Ecological Area
- Saltwater Ecological Area
- Saxton Ecological Area
- Te Wharau Ecological Area
- Three Mile Hill Ecological Area
- Tiropahi Ecological Area
- Upper Totara Ecological Area
- Waipuna Ecological Area

=== Otago Region ===
- Aramoana Ecological Area

=== Southland Region ===
- Lindsay Ecological Area
