= Island reserves =

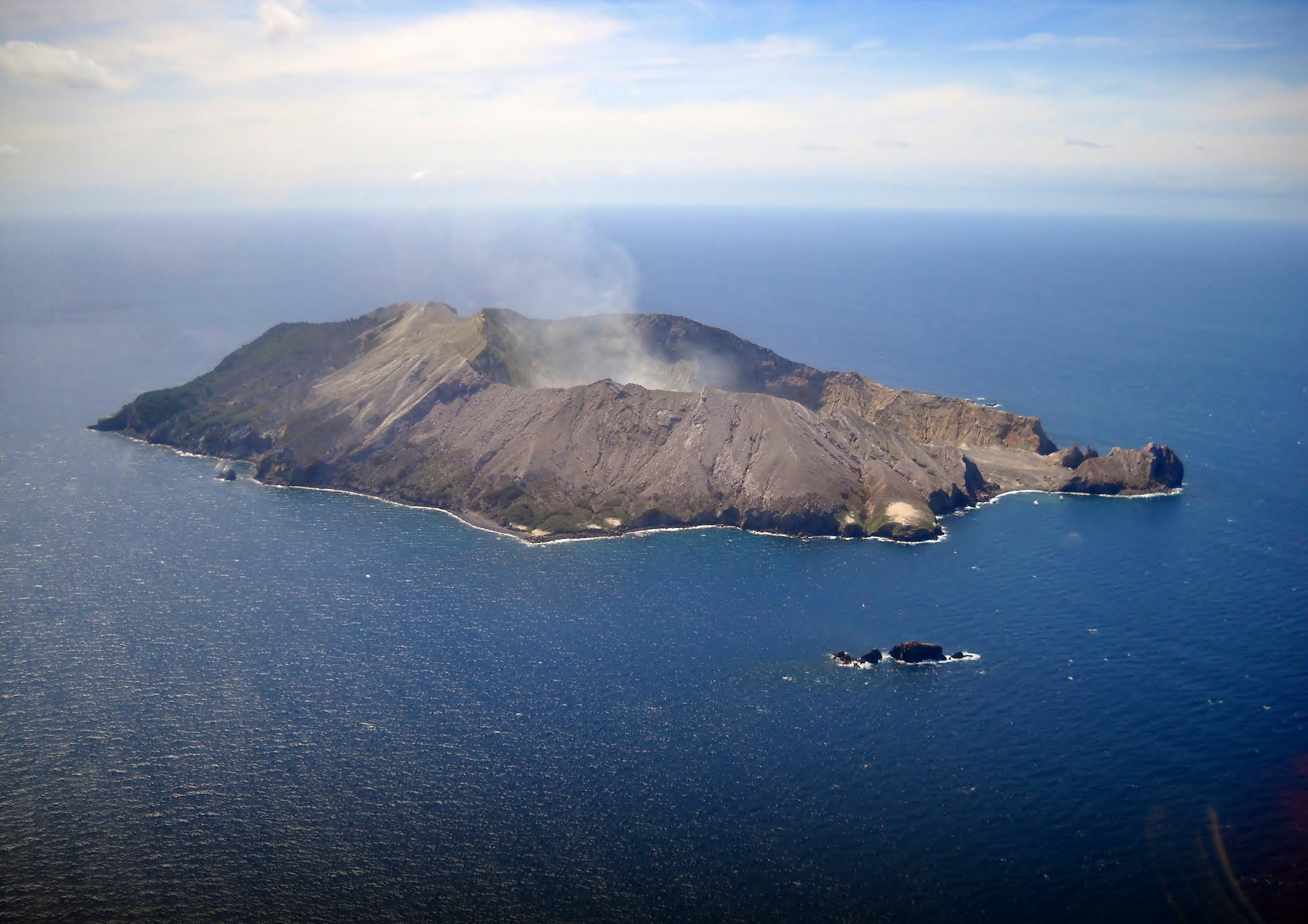
Whakaari / White Island, a private scenic reserve

Island reserves or island sanctuaries are offshore islands of New Zealand set aside by the New Zealand Government as reserves for endemic and native species.

The Department of Conservation manages about 220 larger islands and hundreds of smaller islands and rock formations within the exclusive economic zone of New Zealand. Over 50 of these islands are designated as island reserves due to their populations of native species.

Many of these island ecosystems have not been disturbed by rats and other pest mammals. Others are the sites of successful pest eradication or pest management programmes.

Island reserves are often the last remaining habitats for animals and rare plants, including black robin, kākāpō, tuatara, Duvaucel's gecko, wetapunga and Mercury Island tusked weta. They also contain a wide range of seabirds, including tropic birds and boobies in the north, and several species of albatrosses and penguins in the south.

Since 2016, the Department of Conservation has been working towards eradicating all pest mammals from all island reserves by 2050.

The success of island reserves has led to the establishment of similar reserves on the North Island and South Island, called mainland islands.

== List of island reserves ==
- Blumine Island
- The Brothers Islands
- Codfish Island
- Kapiti Island
- Karewa Island
- Little Barrier Island
- Mana Island
- Maud Island
- Matiu / Somes Island
- Motutapu Island
- Poor Knights Islands
- Rangitoto Island
- Resolution Island
- Stephens Island
- Stewart Island / Rakiura
- Tiritiri Matangi Island
- Ulva Island
- Whakaari / White Island

== See also ==
- Protected areas of New Zealand
- List of islands of New Zealand
