= Whakarewarewa Conservation Park =

- Interactive map of Whakarewarewa Conservation Park
- Location: Bay of Plenty Region, New Zealand
- Coordinates: 38.1842279°S 176.2329579°E

Whakarewarewa Conservation Park or Whakarewarewa Forest Park is a mainland island in the Bay of Plenty Region of New Zealand. It lies close to SH 30 to the southwest of Rotorua.

It is managed by the Department of Conservation.

The five kilometre Tuhoto Ariki Trail through the park is a dual mountain biking and walking track, which takes about 40 minutes by bike or 90 minutes on foot.

== See also ==
- Mainland islands
