= Reserves Act 1977 =

Act of Parliament in New Zealand

New Zealand Parliament
- Long title: An Act to consolidate and amend certain enactments of the Parliament of New Zealand relating to public reserves, to make further provision for their acquisition, control, management, maintenance, preservation (including the protection of the natural environment), development, and use, and to make provision for public access to the coastline and the countryside.
- Royal assent: 23 December 1977
- Commenced: 1 April 1978

Legislative history
- Passed: 1977
- Status: Current legislation

The Reserves Act 1977 is an Act of Parliament passed in New Zealand. It is administered by the Department of Conservation

It contains provisions for the acquisition, control, management, maintenance, development and use of public reserves.

== Types of reserves ==
The law defines particular types of reserves, which are all managed by the department:

- National reserves are areas that have been designated as having national importance due to their historical or ecological value.
- Recreation reserves have been established for recreation and sporting activities, to promote physical welfare and enjoyment and protect the natural environment and beauty.
- Historic reserves have been established to protect and preserve places, objects and natural features that are of historic, archaeological, cultural, educational and other special interest.
- Scenic reserves are reserves protected because of their scenic interest, beauty or natural features. These are the most common type of protected area in New Zealand. Most are small areas of remnant native forest close to roads. Statutory control of scenic reserves was earlier provided by the Scenery Preservation Act 1903 before the Reserves Act 1977 was passed.
- Nature reserves are reserves established to protect indigenous flora or fauna, or rare or scientifically important natural features. Entry to these reserves is limited to those with specific permits.
- Scientific reserves are reserves established to protect areas for scientific research and education. Entry to part of all of these reserves is limited to those with specific permits.
- Government purpose reserves are reserves held for a particular government purposes, like wildlife management areas.
- Local purpose reserves are local reserves held for particular purposes. Local reserves can be created for, "utility, road, street, access way, esplanade, service lane, playcentre, kindergarten, plunket room, or other like purpose", including to protect reservoir catchments.
- Wilderness areas are reserves or parts of reserves maintained in a natural state, with a ban on buildings, roads, human infrastructure or introduced animals.
- Other areas of private, Crown or Māori land may be leased back by the Crown under conservation covenants to preserve the natural environment.

== See also ==
- 1977 in the environment
- Conservation in New Zealand
- Environment of New Zealand
- Protected areas of New Zealand
