= Boundary Stream Mainland Island =

- Interactive map of Boundary Stream Mainland Island
- Location: Hawke's Bay Region, New Zealand
- Coordinates: 39.1044012°S 176.8038839°E
- Opened: 2017

Boundary Stream Mainland Island is a mainland island in the Hawke's Bay Region of New Zealand.

It is managed by the Department of Conservation.

The park includes the Hawke's Bay Region's highest waterfall and several walks, including walks suitable for children.

== See also ==
- Mainland islands
