= Rotoiti Mainland Island =

Island in New Zealand

- Interactive map of Rotoiti Mainland Island
- Location: Tasman District, New Zealand
- Coordinates: 41.806793°S 172.847422°E
- Opened: 1997

Rotoiti Mainland Island or Rotoiti Nature Recovery Project is a mainland island in the Tasman District of New Zealand.

It consists of about 5000 hectares of mostly red, silver and mountain beech forest within Nelson Lakes National Park, situated alongside the Kerr Bay camping ground at Lake Rotoiti, which provide a habitat for large numbers of native birds.

The area is managed by the Department of Conservation, with support from the Friends of Rotoiti volunteer group. It was established in 1997.

== See also ==
- Mainland islands
