= Local purpose reserves =

Type of land protection in New Zealand

Local purpose reserves are a type of New Zealand protected area established under the Reserves Act 1977. Unlike other forms of reserve established under the act, they do not need to have a specific conservation purpose. Many are owned by councils.

Under the legislation, local purpose reserves can be created for a "utility, road, street, access way, esplanade, service lane, playcentre, kindergarten, plunket room, or other like purpose". They include quarry reserves, pilot reserves, aerodrome reserves, and water reserves to protect reservoir catchments.

== Esplanade reserves ==
Esplanade reserves are strips of land beside the sea, rivers and lakes. Historically, many esplanade reserves were 20 m (0.99 ch) wide when they were created, often known as the 'Queen's Chain'.

Under the Resource Management Act 1991, esplanade reserves must contribute to the protection of conservation values, by supporting the natural functioning of an adjacent waterway, its water quality, aquatic habitats, natural values, mitigating natural hazards, or allowing public access if access is compatible with conservation values. District plans can require esplanade reserves for subdivisions of a certain size, and stipulate the width the reserves they must be.
