= Protected areas of New Zealand =

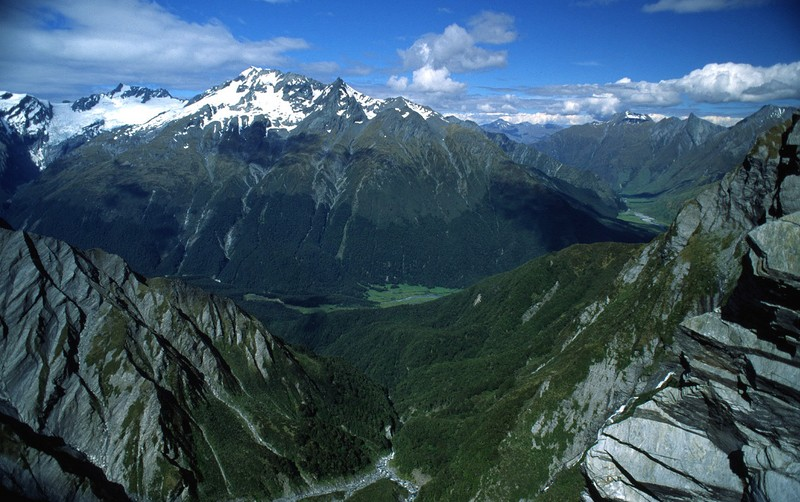
West Matukituki Valley and the Matukituki River seen from Cascade Saddle in Mount Aspiring National Park.

Protected areas of New Zealand are areas that are in some way protected to preserve their environmental, scientific, scenic, historical, cultural or recreational value. There are about 10,000 protected areas, covering about a third of the country. The method and aims of protection vary according to the importance of the resource and whether it is publicly or privately owned.

Nearly 30 percent of New Zealand's land mass is publicly owned with some degree of protection. Most of this land – about 80,000 square kilometres (31,000 sq mi) – is administered by the Department of Conservation. There are 13 national parks, thousands of reserves, 54 conservation parks, and a range of other conservation areas.

The department also manages 49 offshore and coastal marine reserves. Any development in Coastal Marine Areas, which extend up to the mean high water spring mark and up to a kilometre up rivers, require a resource consent under the Resource Management Act.

== History ==
The Māori people of New Zealand have a tradition of declaring a rāhui to restrict access to or exploitation of resources.

Governor Hobson (in office 1840–1842) had instructions from the United Kingdom Home Secretary John Russell for the setting aside of some Crown land in New Zealand: "reserved, for the use of the public at large, all tracts which are likely to be required for purposes of public health, utility, convenience, or enjoyment."

The Public Reserves Act 1854 allowed the Crown to grant public-utility reserves to provinces. The Public Domains Act 1860 covered domains in Auckland and Wellington and allowed the Governor of New Zealand to buy other land. These powers were further extended by the Public Reserves Act 1877, the Public Reserves Act 1881, the Public Reserves and Domains Act 1908, the Public Reserves, Domains and National Parks Act 1928, and the Reserves and Domains Act 1953.

The Reserves Act 1977 superseded previous acts. The 1977 Act, together with the Marine Reserves Act 1971, National Parks Act 1980 and Conservation Act 1987, established New Zealand's modern conservation system.

== National parks ==
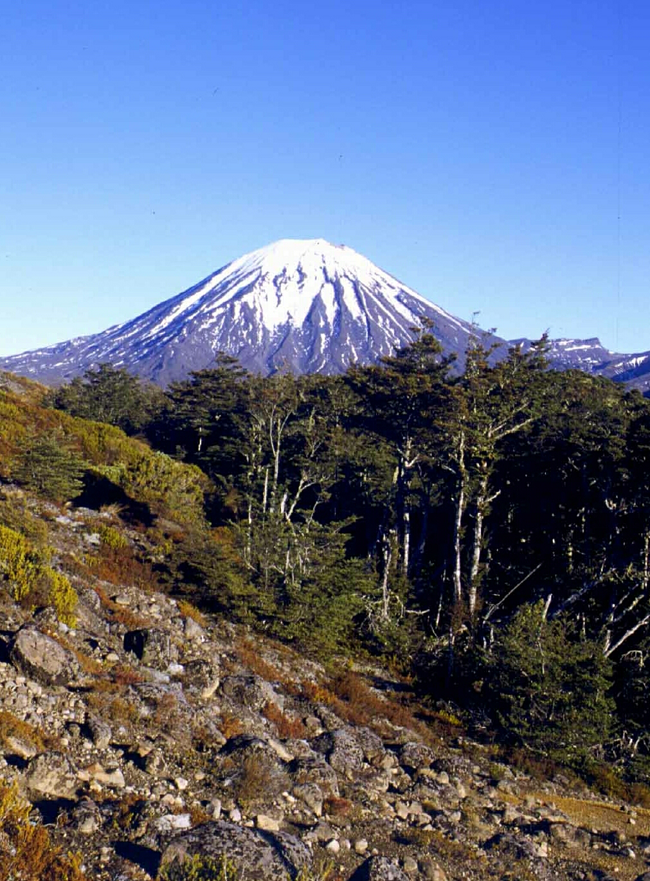
Southern beech forest on the slopes of Mount Ruapehu in Tongariro National Park.

The National Parks Act 1980 provides high protection significant areas known as national parks. These areas provide a habitat for many rare plants and animals, and a place for walking, mountain climbing, boating, snow sports and other forms of recreation.

The first national park, Tongariro National Park, is one of the ten oldest national parks in the world, and has its origins in the gifting of land for a protected area in 1887. It was formally established as a national park in 1894 and is now a World Heritage Site. Te Urewera National Park, established in 1954, was disestablished in 2014 when Te Urewera was returned to the Tuhoe people. As of 2015, there are 13 national parks covering a combined 25,000 square kilometres (9,700 sq mi).

== Marine reserves ==
The Marine Reserves Act 1971 protects several marine areas around New Zealand known as marine reserves. In these areas there is a complete ban on fishing, and on removing or disturbing marine life.

The first marine reserve, Cape Rodney-Okakari Point Marine Reserve, was established in 1975. As of 2026, there are 49 marine reserves covering 9.8 percent (17,700 km^2) of its coastal waters within 12 nautical miles of the coast.

== Reserves ==
The Department of Conservation administers several types of reserve under the Reserves Act 1977:

- National reserves are areas that have been designated as having national importance due to their historical or ecological value.
- Recreation reserves have been established for recreation and sporting activities, to promote physical welfare and enjoyment and protect the natural environment and beauty.
- Historic reserves have been established to protect and preserve places, objects and natural features that are of historic, archaeological, cultural, educational and other special interest.
- Scenic reserves are reserves protected because of their scenic interest, beauty or natural features. These are the most common type of protected area in New Zealand. Most are small areas of remnant native forest close to roads. Scenic reserves were previously established under the Scenery Preservation Act 1903 before the Reserves Act was passed.
- Nature reserves are reserves established to protect indigenous flora or fauna, or rare or scientifically important natural features. Entry to these reserves is limited to those with specific permits.
- Scientific reserves are reserves established to protect areas for scientific research and education. Entry to part of all of these reserves is limited to those with specific permits.
- Government purpose reserves are reserves held for a particular government purposes, like wildlife management areas.
- Local purpose reserves are local reserves held for particular purposes. Local reserves can be created for, "utility, road, street, access way, esplanade, service lane, playcentre, kindergarten, plunket room, or other like purpose", including to protect reservoir catchments. Specific rules apply to esplanade reserves.
- Wilderness areas are reserves or parts of reserves maintained in a natural state, with a ban on buildings, roads, human infrastructure or introduced animals.
- Other areas of private, Crown or Māori land may be leased back by the Crown under conservation covenants to preserve the natural environment.

== Conservation areas ==
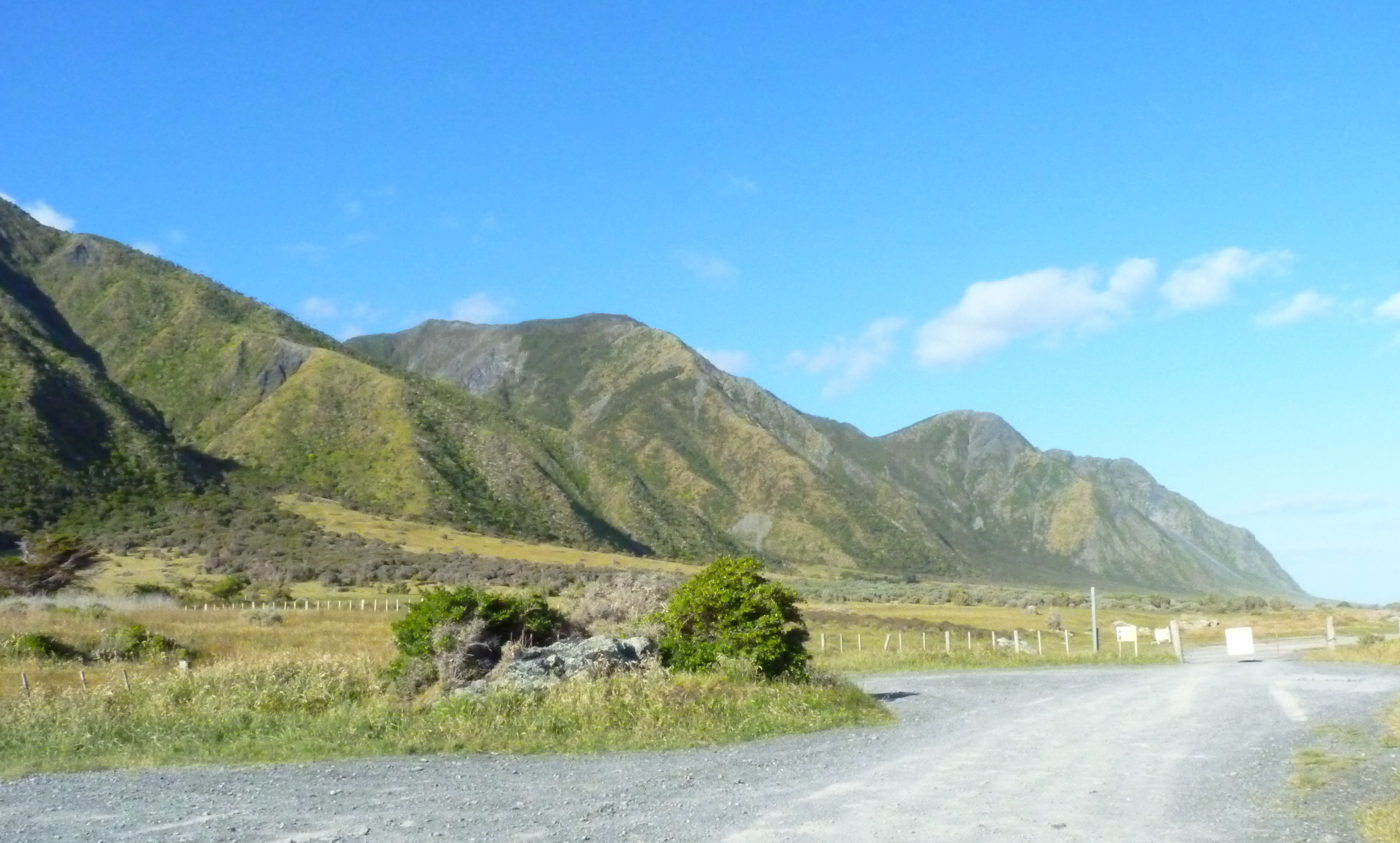
.Aorangi Forest Park, a conservation park

The Department of Conservation administers several types of conservation areas under the Conservation Act 1987:

- Conservation parks are a group of 54 areas protected for their natural and historic resources, and for public use, covering an area of 2,690,191 hectares (6,647,610 acres). They include 36 forest parks that predate the 1987 legislation.
- Wilderness areas are areas of land managed for preservation of indigenous natural resources. Buildings, machinery, livestock, vehicles, aircraft, roads and tracks are banned in these areas unless it is for a specific management, scientific or safety purpose.
- Ecological areas are areas managed for the protection of the particular values of that area. There are currently 112 areas such areas, most being wetlands around Ōkārito Lagoon on West Coast.
- Sanctuary areas are areas managed to preserve indigenous plants and animals in their natural state and for scientific and other similar purposes.
- Watercourse areas are areas of land protected under the Conservation Act, Reserves Act or QEII National Trust Act, which are next to inland waters also under some form of protection. In each area, both the land and waters have outstanding natural or recreational characteristics.
- Amenity areas are areas managed for protection of indigenous natural and historic resources, and for public recreation.
- Wildlife management areas are areas managed for the protection of wildlife and other indigenous natural and historic resources. Examples include Matatā Lagoon, Kārewa / Gannet Island, and Moutohorā Island.
- Marginal strips are barriers of land adjoining the sea, lakes or rivers. They are protected for conservation, the maintenance of waters, water quality, aquatic life, protecting natural values, and ensuring ongoing public access.
- Stewardship areas are areas managed to protect the natural and historic values, which can be disposed of through a public process if retaining the land wouldn't "materially enhance the conservation or recreational values of adjacent land".
- Other conservation and administrative land, including certain types of state forest land, private or Māori land protected by the Minister of Conservation, and land held by the Department of Conservation for offices or visitor centres.

== Ecological islands ==
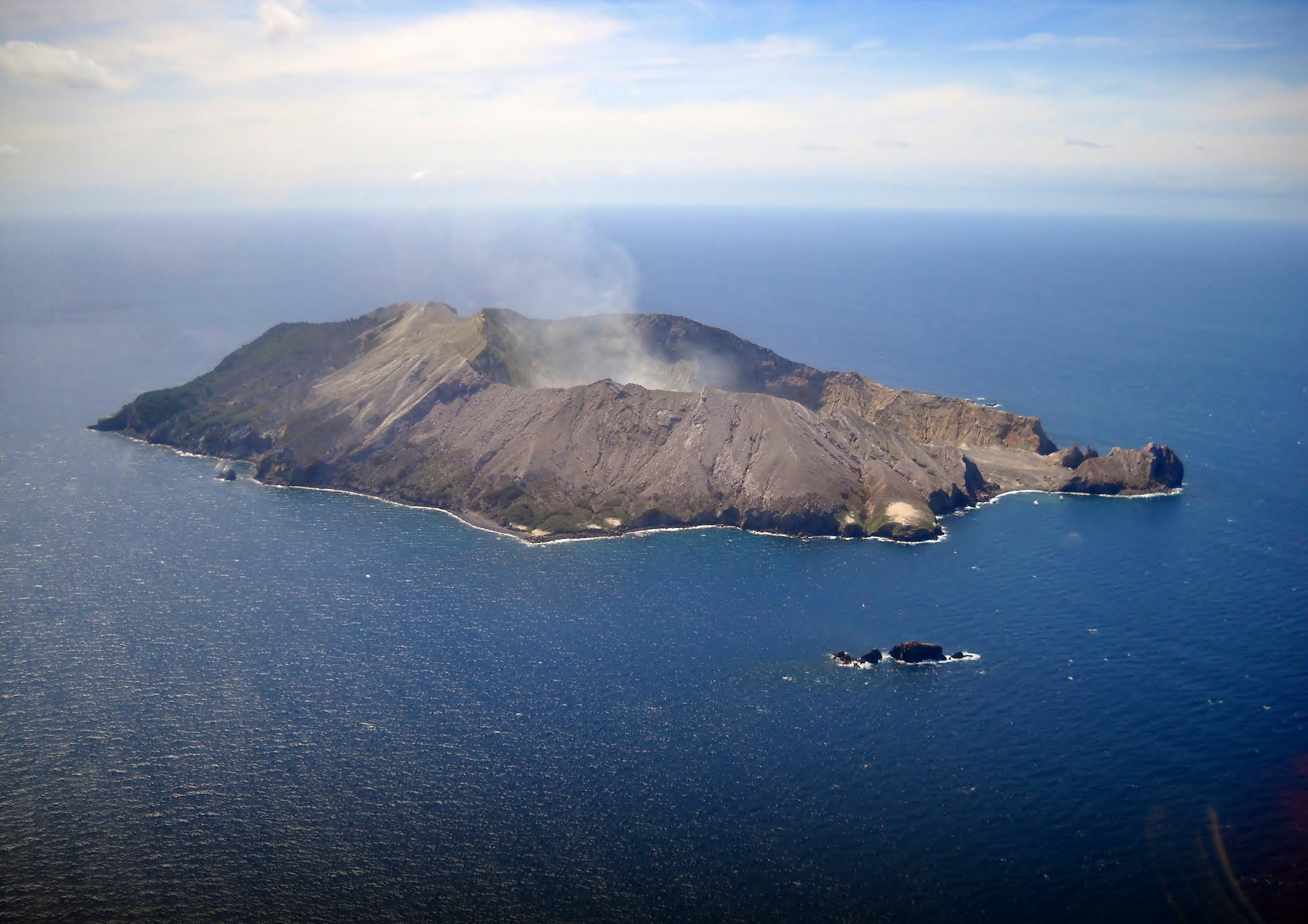
Whakaari / White Island, an island reserve.

The Department of Conservation and private trusts operate ecological islands as protected habitats for endemic and native New Zealand species.

- Island reserves include 50 offshore islands that are nature reserves and hundreds of other islands that the Department of Conservation manage.
- Mainland islands are areas of the mainland North Island and South Island that are isolated by pest-exclusion fences, geographical features or intensive pest control.

== Locally protected areas ==
Many areas are protected and administered by local government:

- Regional parks are protected areas administered by regional councils and unitary authorities.
- Local parks are protected areas administered by territorial authorities and unitary authorities.

== Internationally protected areas ==
There are ten areas in New Zealand protected by international law:

- There are seven wetlands protected as Ramsar sites under the Ramsar Convention and administered by the Department of Conservation, covering an area of about 56,000 hectares (140,000 acres). Most other wetlands are not formally protected, but projects have been established to restore those that remain.
- There are three World Heritage Sites legally protected by an international convention administered by the United Nations Educational, Scientific and Cultural Organization (UNESCO) due to their cultural, historical, scientific or other significance to humanity. There are Te Wahipounamu, Tongariro National Park and the New Zealand Subantarctic Islands.

== Other protected areas ==
Other protected areas include many public and privately owned wetlands.
