= Arborglyph =

Carvings on living trees

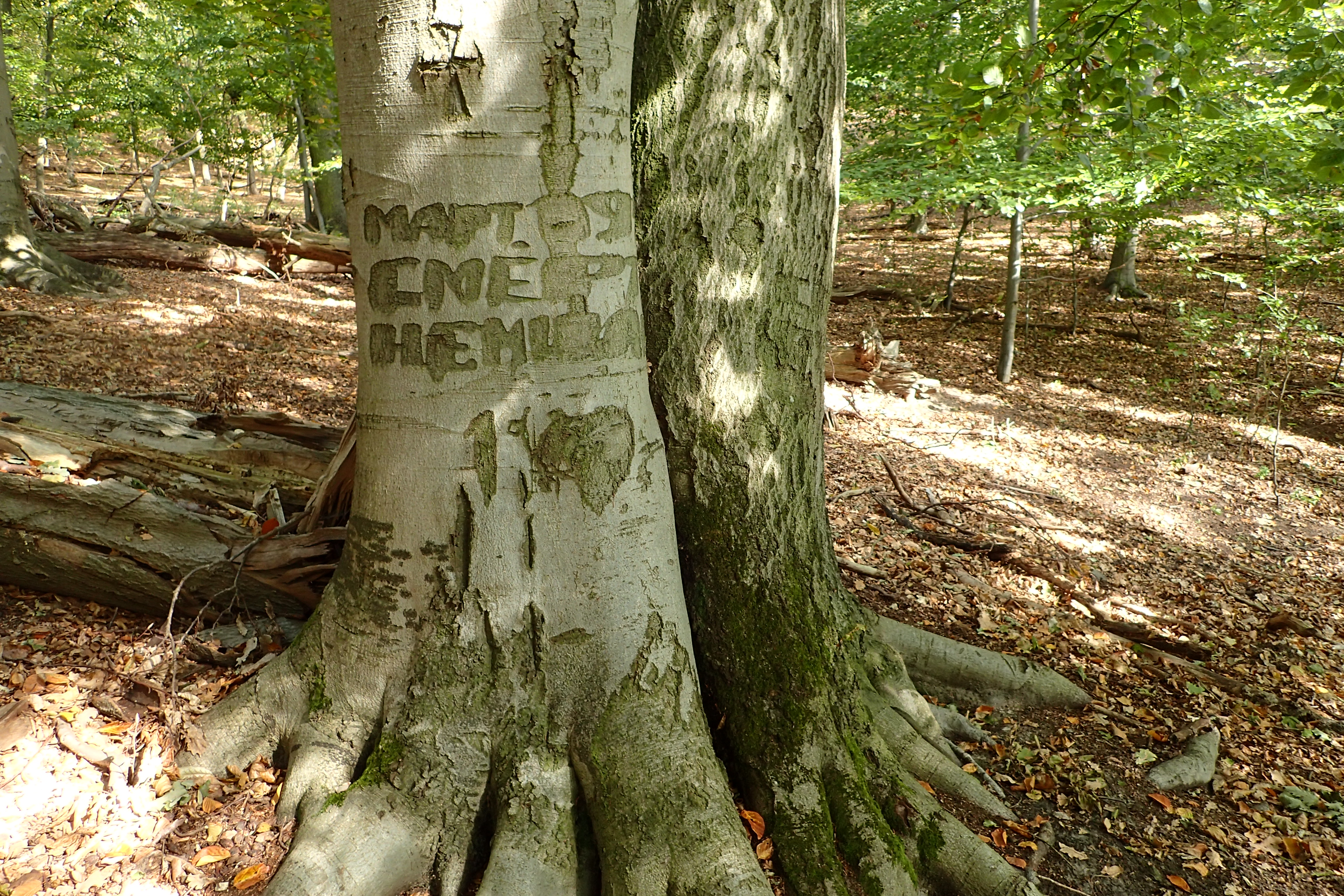
Tree carving in Bielinek (Bellinchen), Pomerania, immediately east of the Oder. It reads, in Russian, "March 1945, Death to the Germans."

Arborglyphs, dendroglyphs, silvaglyphs, or modified cultural trees are carvings of shapes and symbols into the bark of living trees. Although most often referring to ancient cultural practices, the term also refers to modern tree-carving.

== Love carvings ==
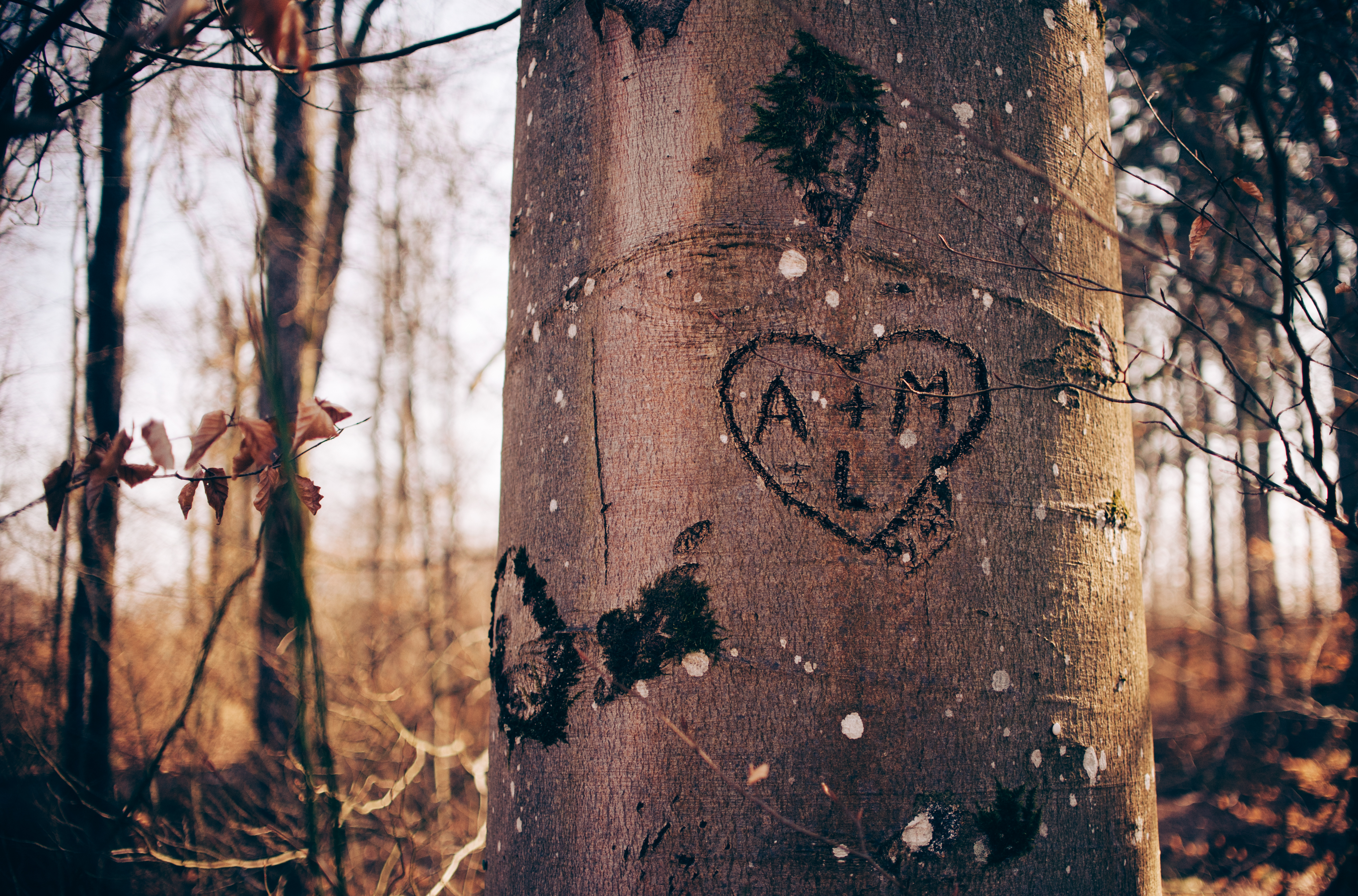
Lovers' initials carved into trees.

Carving names and initials into trees is a common practice among lovers; the carvings can last for decades, as a symbol of the permanence of the couple's love. This practice would appear to date back up to the classical era, with Callimachus writing in his Aetia, "But graven on your bark may ye bear such writing as shall declare 'Cydippe beautiful'" (fragment 73). It also appears in the Eclogues of Virgil: "Resolved am I in the woods, rather, with wild beasts to couch, and bear my doom, and character my love upon the tender tree-trunks: they will grow, and you, my love, grow with them."

This carving was also practised in Renaissance England, as evidenced by the writings of William Shakespeare (in As You Like It, 1599) and John Evelyn (in Sylva, 1664).

== Damage to trees ==
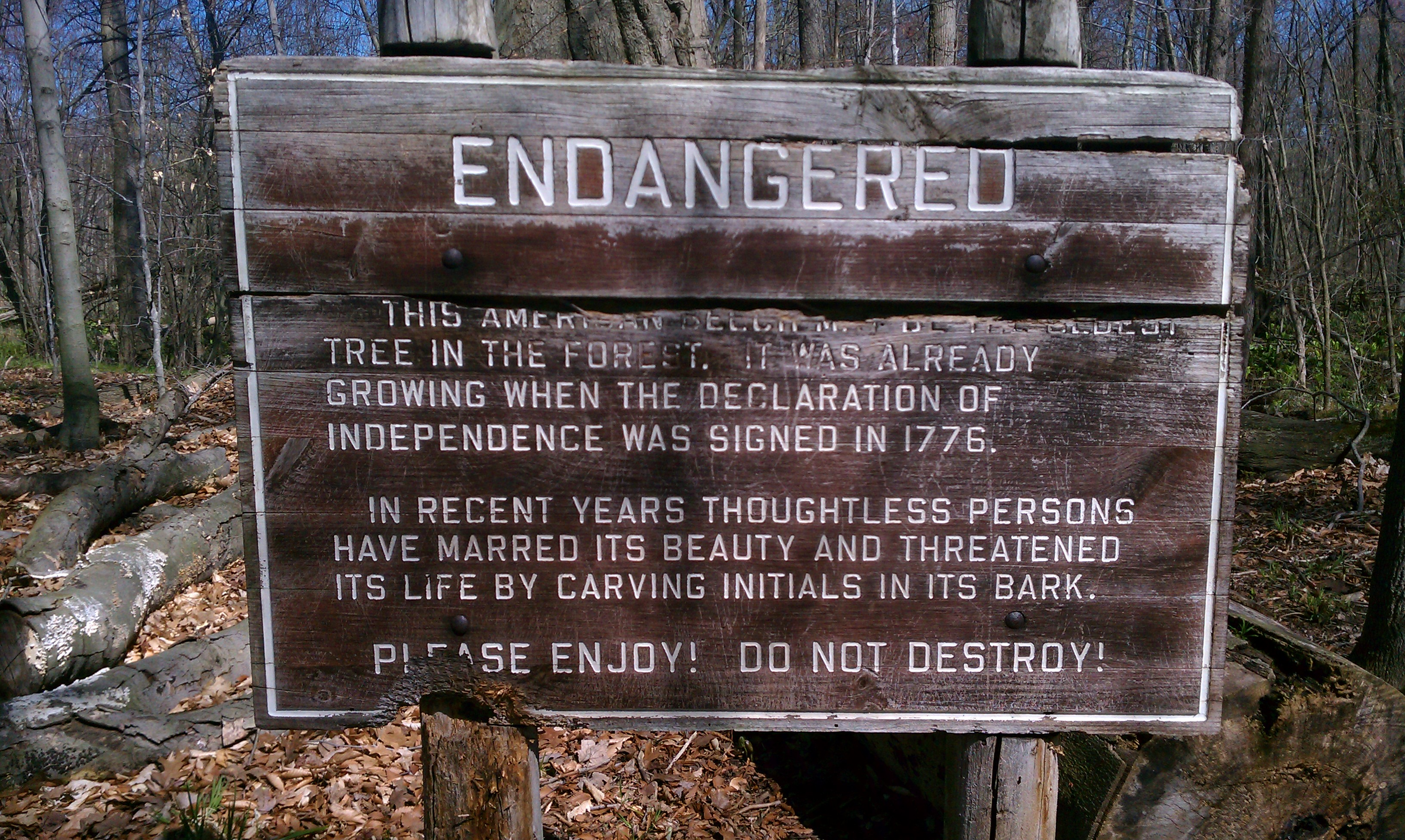
A sign warns visitors against carving into an American beech tree in Waterloo State Recreation Area, Michigan.

Carving in the bark may damage the tree, by allowing diseases or pests to enter the tree. Bark acts as a protective layer similar to the way skin does in humans, keeping pests and harmful bacteria out of the organism. Breaking the protective layer not only allows disease in, but it may also cause cellular damage if the cut penetrates below the bark, disrupting its ability to transport nutrients through xylem and phloem. Owing to the fungal systems that link some trees, disease may even spread to surrounding trees.

== Culturally significant dendroglyphs ==
People around the world have carved designs in trees imbued with cultural or spiritual significance. These include Aboriginal Australian peoples, including in present-day New South Wales, Western Australia, and Northern Territory. In parts of Latvia and Estonia, some rural-dwelling people carve a cross on a certain tree after someone dies. In Dalarna, Sweden, tree carvings from the 17th century called fäbodsristning, made by girl shepherds, have been documented by the local museum. In the western United States, there are incised drawings on aspens known as arborglyphs, made by shepherds and hunters, and there are carvings made by the Chumash people depicting astronomical features.

=== Australasia ===
==== Boabs in Western Australia ====
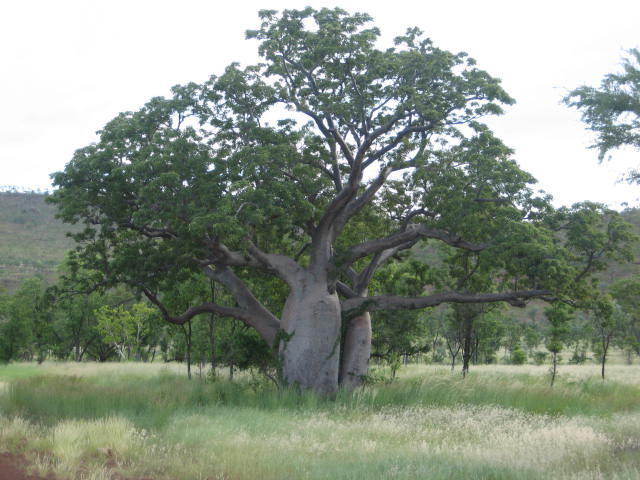
Boab in the Kimberley

The first systematic survey of carved boab trees in Australia was launched in 2021, in the Kimberley region of Western Australia. Researchers from four universities worked with Aboriginal communities, using photogrammetry to record 3D images of carvings on the huge trees. In October 2022, the team published the results of their survey of such trees in the Tanami Desert. The carvings relate to the Lingka (King Brown Snake) Dreaming track across the desert. Many of the carvings are of snakes, but they also include emu and kangaroo tracks; geometric markings; and, further west, crocodiles, turtles, and Wandjina figures.

==== Chatham Islands ====
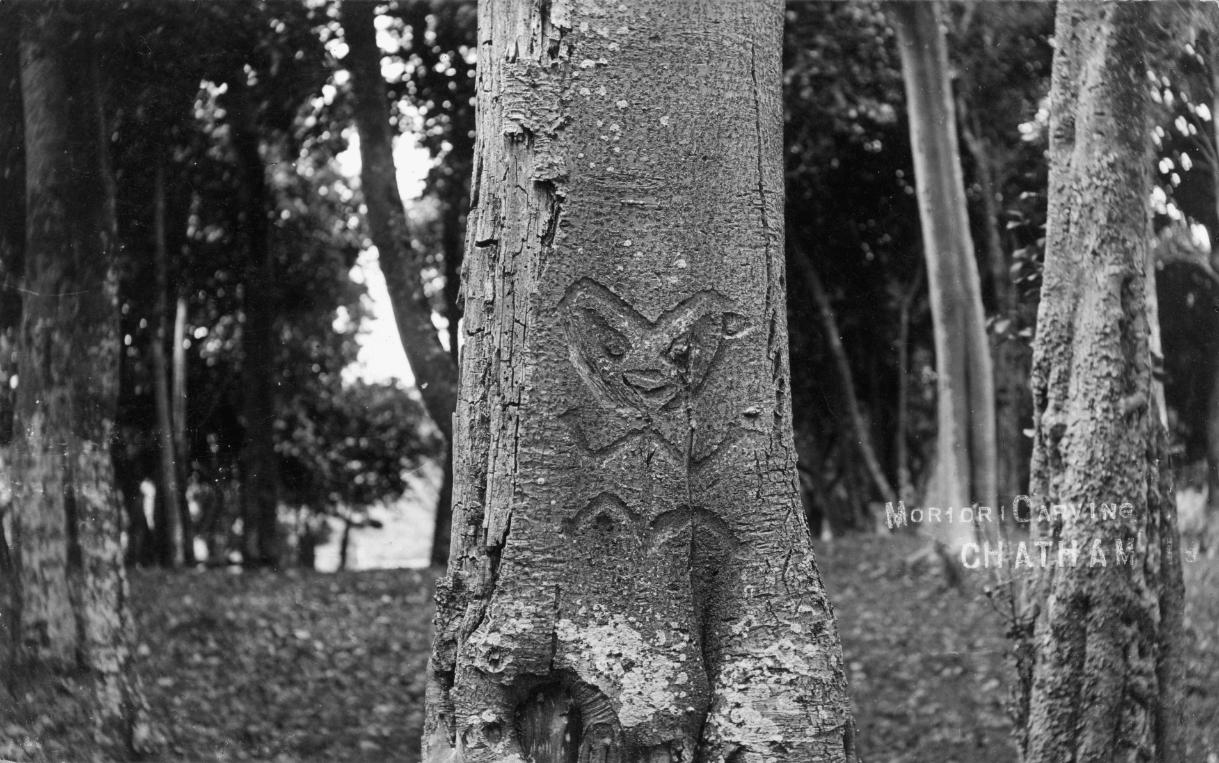
Moriori carving c. 1900

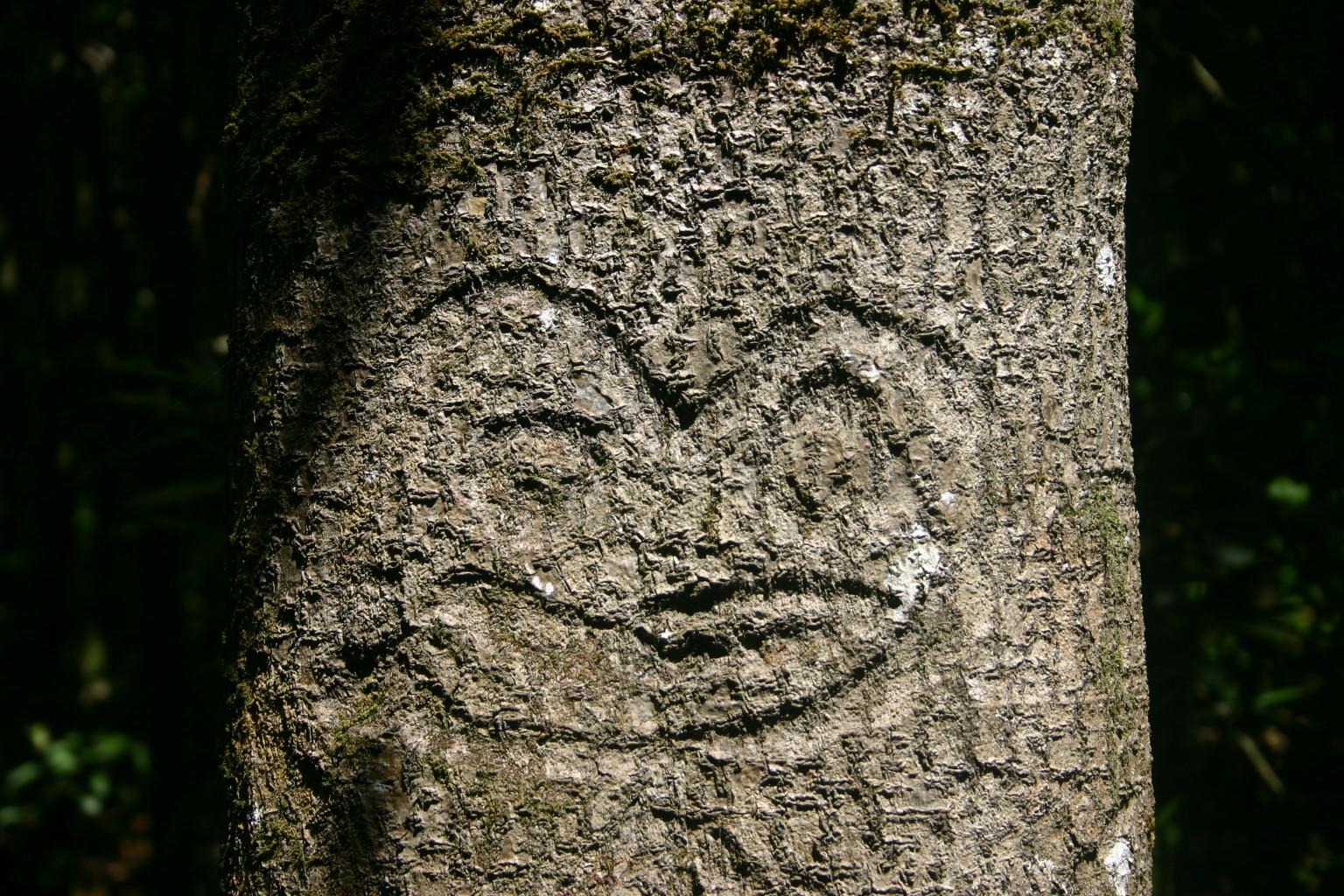
An example of Chatham Islands carvings

In the Chatham Islands (Rēkohu) of New Zealand, the indigenous Moriori people practised the art of momori rakau, or tree carving. The carvings depict Moriori karapuna (ancestors) and symbols of the natural world, such as patiki (flounder) and the hopo (albatross). They are all done on the bark of Corynocarpus laevigatus, or kōpi, trees, which have thick, soft bark, and are all located near evidence of settlements in the form of middens.They were done between sometime in the 17th century and around 1835, which is when the Māori people arrived on the island. Most of those seen today were made in the 19th century.

During the 1940s, many fallen trees were found with carvings, in 31 different places on Chatham Island and at Te Puinga on Pitt Island. A survey done in late 1998 found 147 trees with carvings in 5 locations on Rekohu, with 82 trees at Hapapu.

The carvings are mostly images of people, with many of them showing ribs, somewhat similar to the X-ray art found throughout the Pacific region. It has been speculated that at least some of the symbols represent the dead, based on the fact that in some, the figures have their knees pulled up to their chests, in the position that deceased Moriori were buried in dunes. There are also images of animals, such as flounders and birds, and one of a seal was found on Pitt Island. Others showed tree-like symbols and weapons, and many of the trees have horizontal carvings, like rings.

The best known examples of momori rakau are at Hāpūpū / J M Barker Historic Reserve, where the carvings and trees are protected by a fenced enclosure and the protection of being one of only two National Historic Reserves in New Zealand. The reserve was fenced in 1980 to provide protection for the tree carvings from grazing stock and is now showing good recovery.

=== North America ===
==== Aspen carvings ====
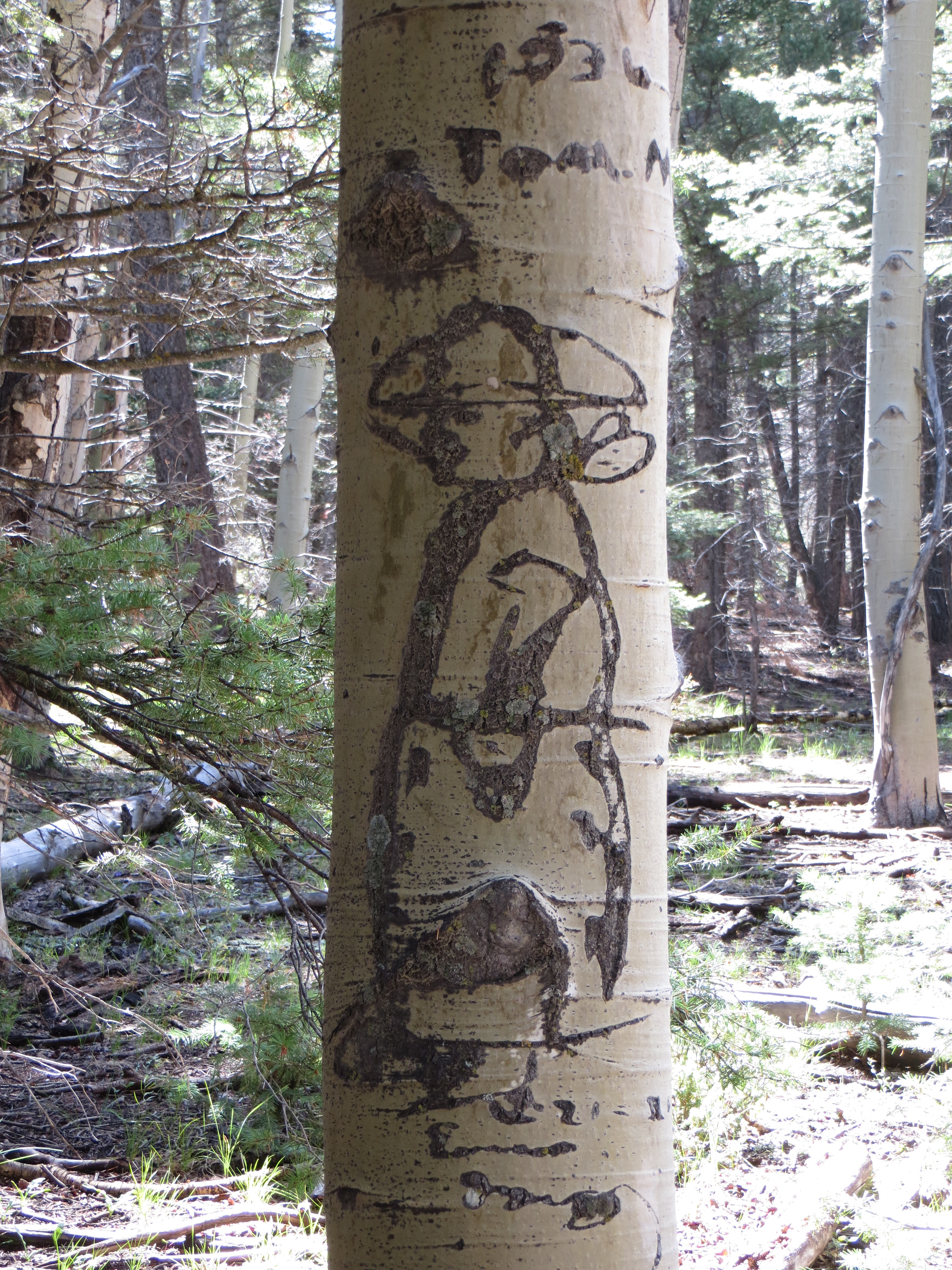
Portrait in aspen tree of Tom Mix, dated 1936, Santa Fe National Forest, New Mexico

Aspen carvings are arborglyphs made in the bark of aspen trees by shepherds, many of them Basque, Hispanic, Greek, or Irish American. The arborglyphs have been documented across the Southwestern United States, from northern California and Idaho down to Colorado and New Mexico. Basque immigrants from the Pyrenees came to work as shepherds in the mid-19th century, and, spending long hours alone in forests, etched drawings and poetry into the aspen trees with a knife or even their fingernails. One expert alone has recorded around 20,000 tree carvings across California, Nevada, and Oregon, dating from the early 1900s.

The markings turned darker against the pale bark as the tree healed itself. Aspens typically only live around 100 years, but arborglyphs have also been found on dead fallen trees. The subject of these carvings range from dates and names to quite detailed drawings, sometimes depicting explicit sexual themes. Individual artists would frequently sign their works, and the Basque shepherds often in cursive, though the more erotic art is exclusively anonymous. The carvings often reflect their lonely lives tending sheep. Wildfires, disease, and natural deterioration are reducing the number of the aspen arborglyphs today.

A grove of aspens with Basque arborglyphs in the Steens Mountain region of southeastern Oregon have been designated as Oregon Heritage Trees.

A project was run by the USDA Forest Service in 1997 to record and study arborglyphs in the Fremont National Forest of southeastern Oregon, near Lakeview.

==== Chumash arborglyph ====
The glyph on the "scorpion tree" (now known as the Chumash Arborglyph) viewed from Painted Rock in Carrizo Plain, California, shows the counterclockwise rotation of stars around Polaris, apparently showing Ursa Major in relation to Polaris.

Paleontologist Rex Saint Onge, who saw the tree in 2006, realised that the tree was carved by Native Americans, specifically Chumash people. The ancient oak in the Santa Lucia Mountains in San Luis Obispo County had the outline of a lizard-like being with six legs, nearly 3 ft (0.91 m) tall, carved into its trunk, and included a rectangular crown and two large circles. The Chumash had painted similar designs on rock formations in California.

Saint Onge was not the first European American to speculate that Chumash paintings might have astronomical implications. In the 1970s, anthropologist Travis Hudson's book Crystals in the Sky combined his observations of the rock art of the Chumash people with cultural data recorded by ethnographer John P. Harrington nearly a century earlier.

The lower half of the lizard-like image is actually a graphic representation of the movement of a shadow over the course of a year. This was made with a Chumash invention similar to a sundial, in which the stick is aligned with the North Star, and the lines drawn on the rock are traced from the movement of the stick's shadow on the days of the two solstices and equinoxes, which held cultural significance for the Chumash.

== Gallery ==
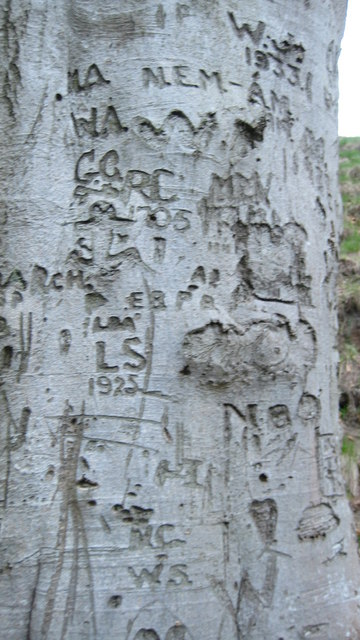
Initials of several couples carved into a tree. Most bear dates from the 1920s and 1930s

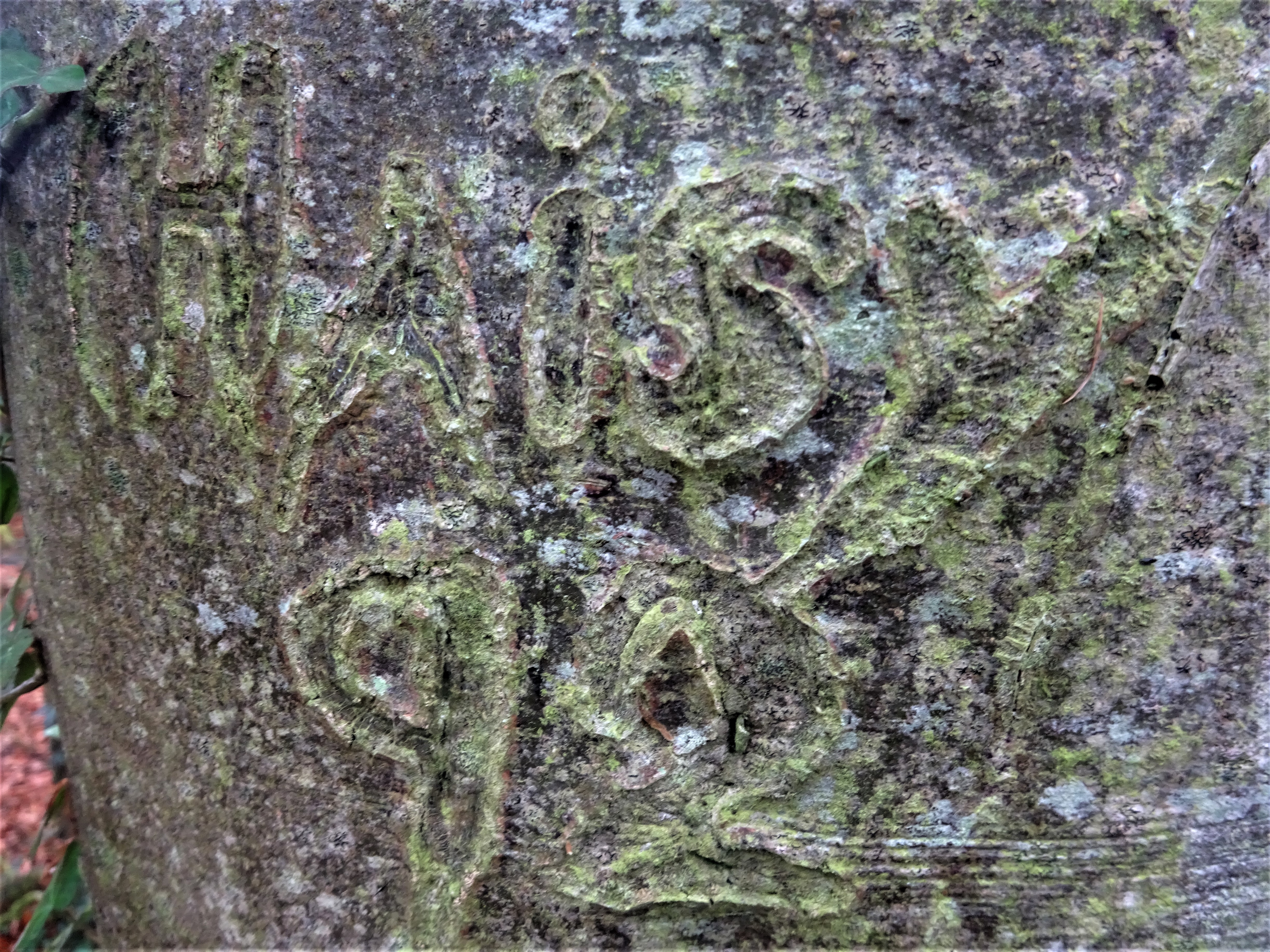
"Haisy 92" carved on a tree; the characters have stretched as the tree has grown

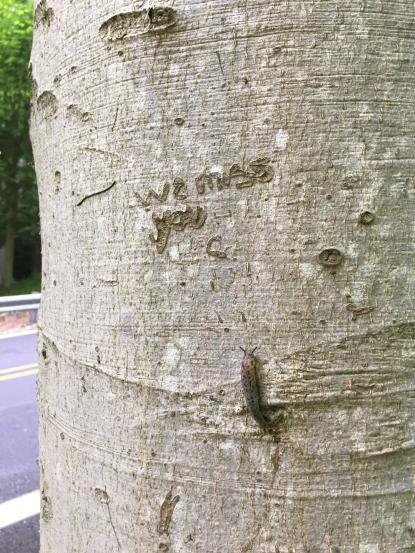
Message reading "we miss you" carved into a tree, with no dates or names accompanying it. Found in Patapsco, Maryland. Other carvings on this tree date between 1970s and present time

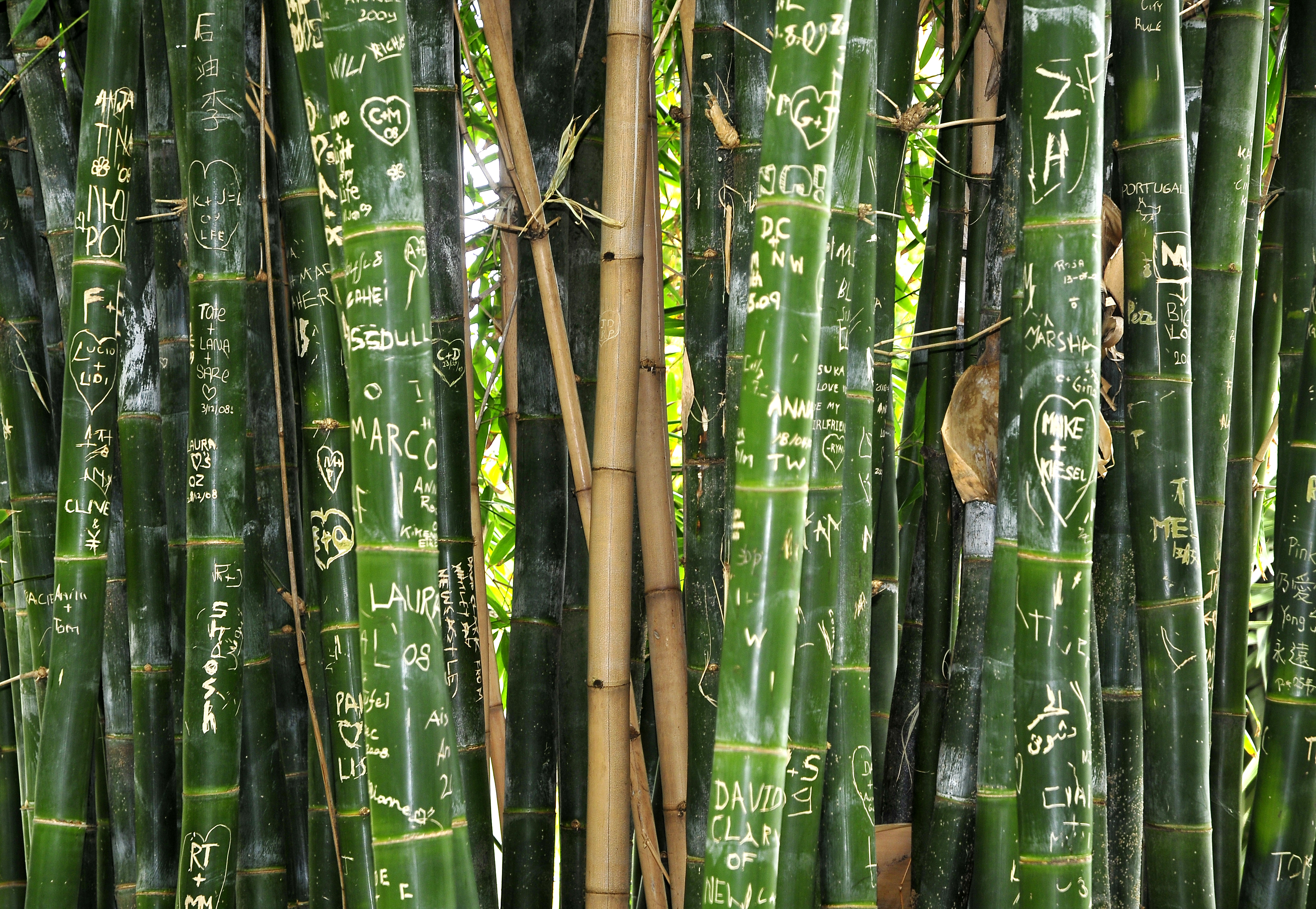
Carvings on bamboo, Australia

Tree carvings bearing initials and the phrase "I"m Watching You" above them in a different script. Taken in Manchester, CT.
