= Karewa Island =

Island in New Zealand

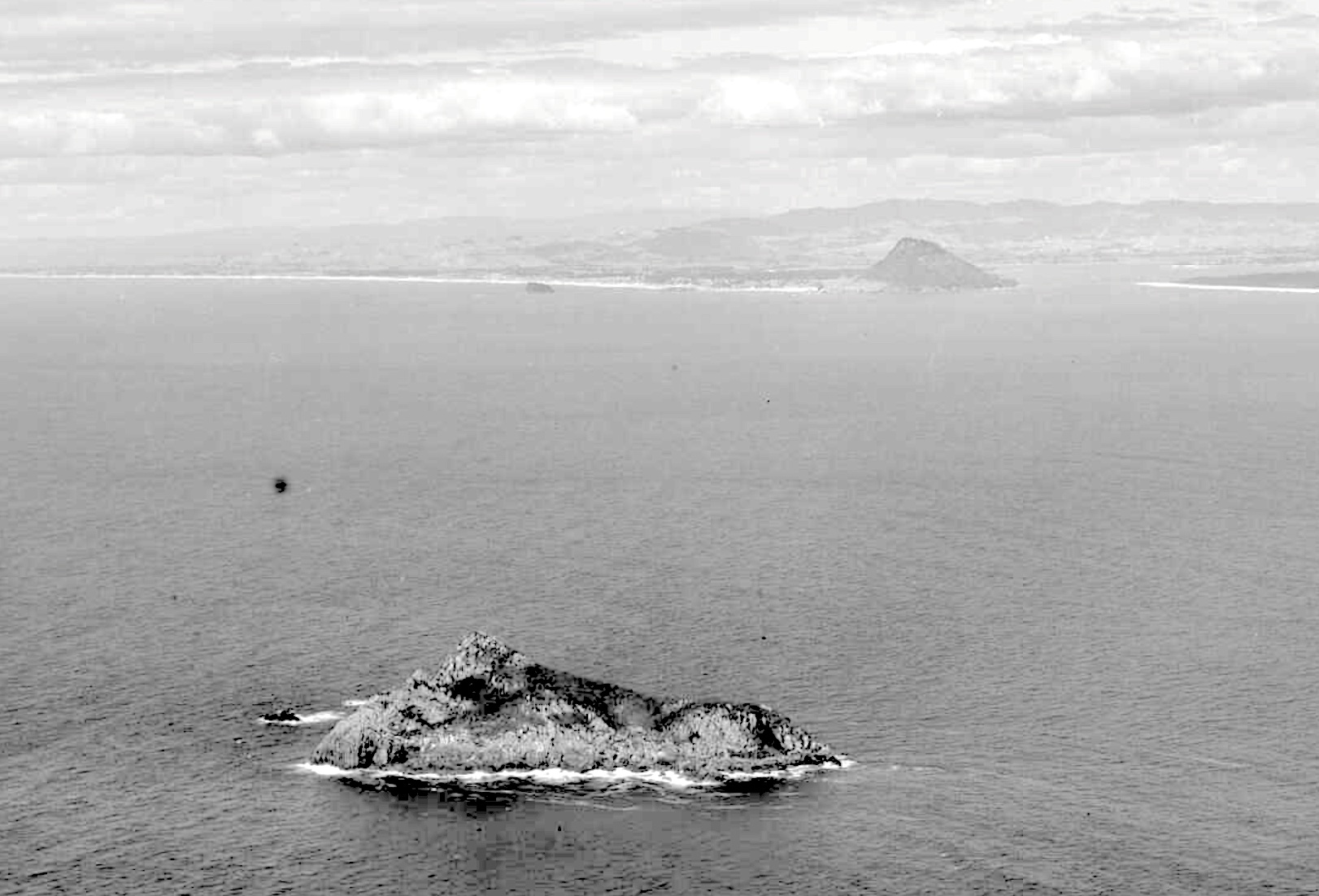
- Karewa Island in 1954

- Location within New Zealand

Geography
- Location: Bay of Plenty region
- Coordinates: 37.53012°S 176.13136°E
- Area: 3.54 ha (8.7 acres)
- Highest elevation: 79 m (259 ft)

Administration
- New Zealand

Karewa (Māori: Te Motu o Karewa), is a small, 3.57 ha (8.8 acres), predator free wildlife sanctuary in the Bay of Plenty. It is about 6 km (3.7 mi) off Matakana Island and administered by the Department of Conservation (DoC), with Ngāti Ranginui. Its main species are tuatara and flesh-footed shearwaters. A legend of Taurikura relates how the tuatara on Karewa are descended from a chief's errant daughter.

== Natural history ==
Karewa is dominated by Taupata shrubland, growing on a deep friable soil on its south and west slopes, underlain by Pleistocene Minden rhyolite. Under the Wildlife Sanctuary (Karewa Island) Order 1965, landing is prohibited without a DoC permit, as it is a Government Purpose Wildlife Sanctuary under the Reserves Act 1977. The shearwaters nest in tunnels all over the island, and breed from November to May. Many Diving petrels breed from August to February and grey-faced petrels / ōi also nest on Karewa, which used to be a traditional source of these titi (mutton birds) and also of pāua, cray and kina. The island is visited by kekeno seals and is a popular dive site, known for its variety of fish.

== Wreck ==
On the north side of the island, a large boiler remains from the steamer Taranaki, wrecked in fog on 29 November 1878, on the way from Auckland to Tauranga and ports to the south. There were no deaths, as the 75 passengers were able to reach the island. The Taranaki was a 415 grt steamer, launched in 1865 at the Castle Yard of Blackwood & Gordon in Port Glasgow for the NZ Steam Navigation Co. She had previously sunk on Boat Harbour Rock (now called Taranaki Rock), at the entrance to Tory Channel / Kura Te Au, on 19 August 1868, but had been taken over by the Union Company and raised and refitted in September 1869. The Court of Inquiry found that the captain should have taken depth soundings and charged him the court costs, but didn't suspend him. However, as the captain was popular for introducing regular shipping calls at Tauranga he was given a presentation of appreciation a few weeks later. The channel between the island and Matakana is about 11 fathoms (66 ft; 20 m) deep.

== See also ==
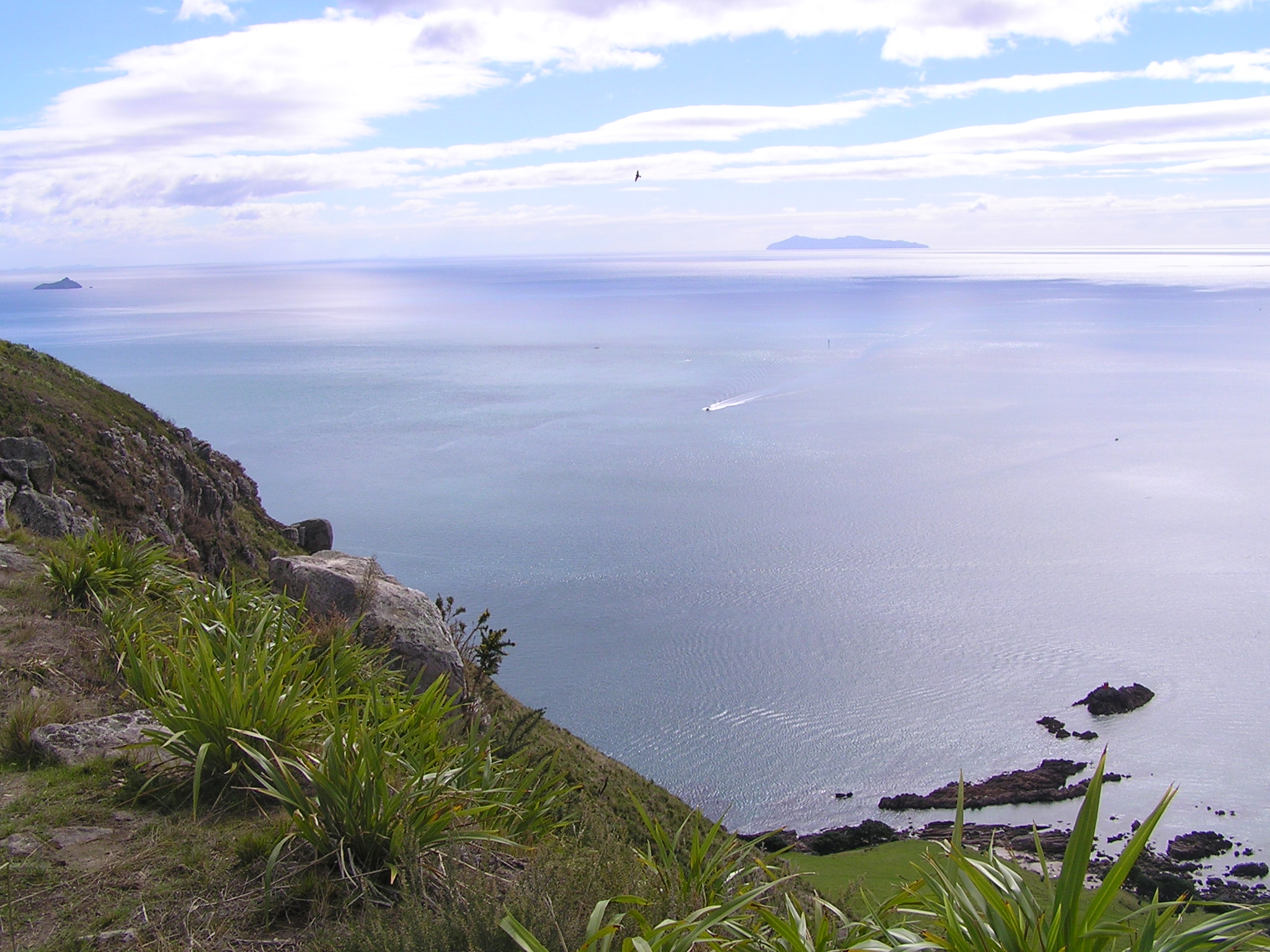
Karewa (left) from Mount Maunganui. Mayor Island / Tūhua is to the right.

- List of islands
- List of islands of New Zealand
