= Sanctuary area =

Type of protected area in New Zealand

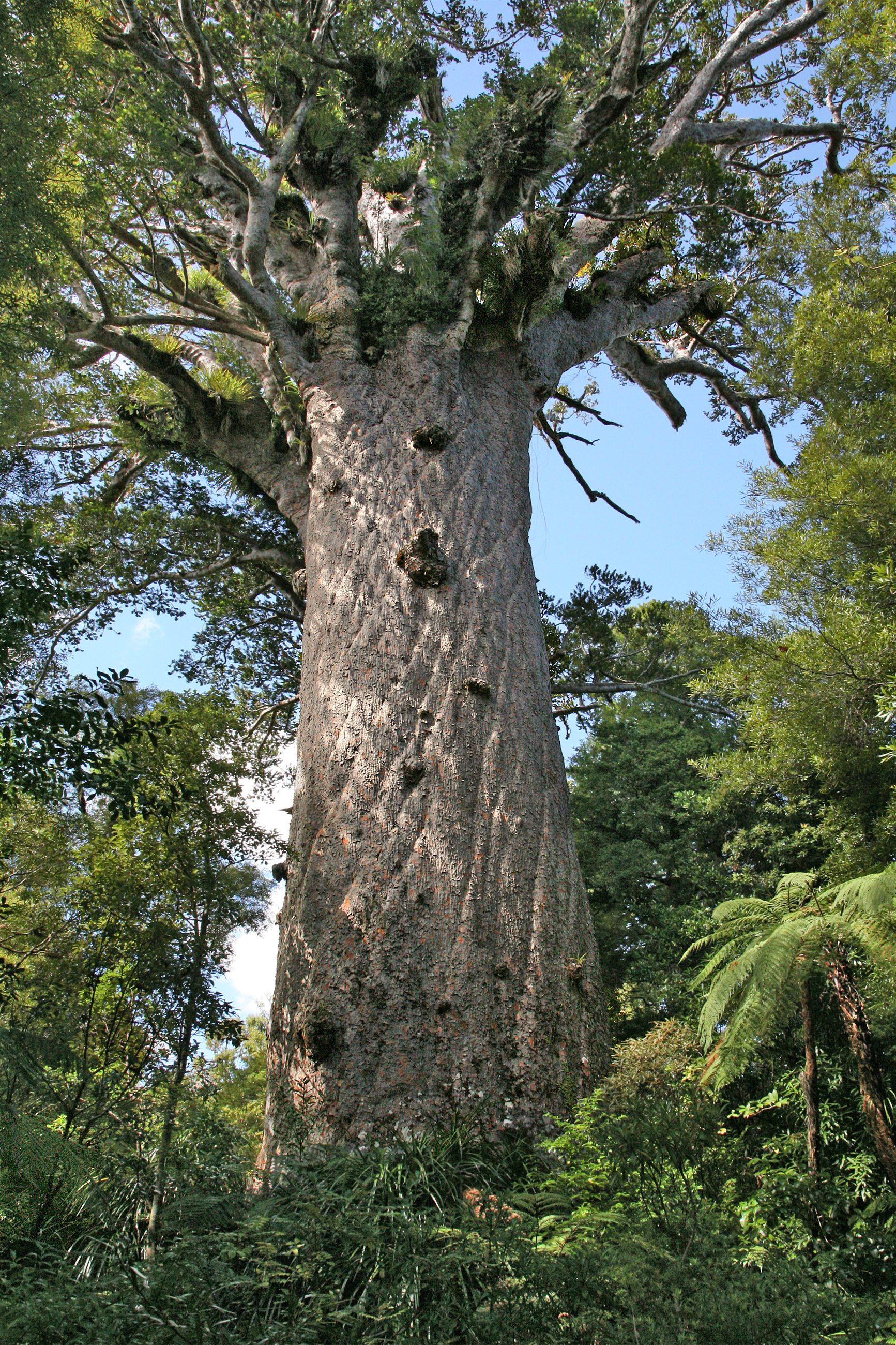
Tāne Mahuta, a giant kauri, was protected as part of the Waipoua Forest Sanctuary.

A sanctuary area is a type of New Zealand protected area. They exist to preserve populations of important forest types, like the remnants of kauri forests in Northland.

Sanctuary areas are relatively rare. Like ecological areas, most sanctuary areas were set aside by the now defunct New Zealand Forest Service in the 1970s and 1970s in response to activism by the conservationist movement.

The 9,105-hectare Waipoua Forest Sanctuary, featuring giant kauri such as Tāne Mahuta, was established as the first Sanctuary Area in 1952. The Whirinaki Sanctuary, created in the 1980s to protect the podocarp forests of Whirinaki Forest Park, was one of the last to be established.

The Land Information New Zealand website lists 10 sanctuary areas recognised by the New Zealand Geographic Board:

- Te Arai Sanctuary, Northland
- Wairaki Forest Sanctuary, Auckland
- Otawa Sanctuary Area, Bay of Plenty, Bay of Plenty
- Sugar Loaf Islands Sanctuary, Taranaki
- Ngā Motu / Sugar Loaf Islands Sanctuary, Taranaki
- Oapui Sanctuary, Taranaki
- Erua Forest Sanctuary, Manawatū-Whanganui
- Esk Kiwi Sanctuary, Hawke's Bay
- Hihitahi Forest Sanctuary, Manawatū-Whanganui
- Rocky Hills Sanctuary Area, Wellington
