= Paengaroa Mainland Island =

- Interactive map of Paengaroa Mainland Island
- Location: Manawatū-Whanganui, New Zealand
- Coordinates: 39°38′42″S 175°43′12″E
- Opened: 1990

Paengaroa Mainland Island or Paengaroa Scenic Reserve is a mainland island in the Manawatū-Whanganui Region of New Zealand.

It is managed by the Department of Conservation and became a mainland island in 1990.

The park has many rare plant species. It features a short ten minute walk including a bridge over Hautapu River.

== See also ==
- Mainland islands
