= Historic reserves of New Zealand =

Type of protected area in New Zealand

Historic reserves are a type of New Zealand protected area. Most are less than 10 hectares in size, and protect places of places, objects, and natural features of historic, archaeological, cultural or educational value. Land Information New Zealand lists 185 historic reserves on its website.

Northland's historic reserves include Ruapekapeka pā, the site of a significant battle in 1846, and Pompallier House, an early Catholic mission at Russell.

In Auckland, some historic reserves are located on the Hauraki Gulf. One reserve protects the World War II fortifications at Stony Batter on Waiheke Island. Another includes the palatial house and Italian garden of 19th century Governor George Grey, which is maintained by volunteers.

Wellington's historic reserves include the wooden Government Buildings.

In Otago, there are several historic reserves related to the Otago gold rush, including St Bathans Post Office and the former diggings at Gabriels Gully.

== North Island ==
=== Northland Region ===
- Ahipara Gumfields Historic Reserve
- Akatārere Historic Reserve
- Akatere Historic Reserve
- Akeake Historic Reserve
- Cable Bay Historic Reserve
- Edmonds Ruins Historic Reserve
- Flagstaff Hill Historic Reserve
- Harata Historic Reserve
- Kahuwhera Pa Historic Reserve
- Kaipara North Head Lighthouse Historic Reserve
- Kerikeri Wharf Historic Reserve
- Kohukohu Historic Reserve
- Kororipo Pa Historic Reserve
- Mangonui Court House Historic Reserve
- Marsden Cross Historic Reserve
- Motumaire Historic Reserve
- Muiata Pa Historic Reserve
- Okiato Point Historic Reserve
- Okuratope Pa Historic Reserve
- Pairatahi Gum Historic Reserve
- Pompallier House Historic Reserve
- Rangikapiti Pa Historic Reserve
- Ruapekapeka Historic Reserve
- Tapeka Point Historic Reserve
- Waikare Historic Reserve

=== Auckland Region ===
- Fort Takapuna Historic Reserve
- Kawau Island Historic Reserve
- Mahurangi River Historic Reserve
- Matietie Historic Reserve
- Maungauika / North Head Historic Reserve
- North Head Historic Reserve
- Onepoto Historic Reserve
- Pratts Road Historic Reserve
- Smeltinghouse Historic Reserve
- S.S. Wairarapa Graves (Tapuwai Point) Historic Reserve
- St Johns Redoubt Historic Reserve
- Stony Batter Historic Reserve
- Te Maketu Historic Reserve
- Waiau Pa Historic Reserve
- Wiri Historic Reserve

=== Waikato Region ===
- Bald Spur Historic Reserve
- Cameron Town Historic Reserve
- Gudex Memorial Park Historic Reserve
- Kakepuku Mountain Historic Reserve
- Meremere Pa Site Historic Reserve
- Opepe Bush Scenic & Historic Reserve
- Opera Point Historic Reserve
- Opito Point Historic Reserve
- Paterangi Historic Reserve
- Puketapu Historic Reserve
- Puraho Historic Reserve
- Rangiriri Pa Historic Reserve
- Sailors Grave Historic Reserve
- School Of Mines Historic Reserve
- Selwyn Park Historic Reserve
- Smith Historic Reserve
- Taniwha Pa Historic Reserve
- Te Pare Point Historic Reserve
- Te Puia Block Historic Reserve
- Te Wheoro's Redoubt Historic Reserve
- Victoria Battery Historic Reserve
- Whangamarino Redoubt Historic Reserve
- Wigmore Historic Reserve

=== Bay of Plenty Region ===
- Fort Galatea Historic Reserve
- Gate Pa Historic Reserve
- Gerald Crapp Historic Reserve
- Hine Rae Historic Reserve
- Kauri Point Historic Reserve
- Matekerepu Historic Reserve
- Maungaruahine Pa Historic Reserve
- Paparoa Pa Historic Reserve
- Tokitoki Historic Reserve
- Waiotahe Spit Historic Reserve
- Waiotahi Spit Historic Reserve

=== Gisborne Region ===
- Puhi Kai Iti / Cook Landing Site National Historic Reserve
- Te Kuri a Paoa/Young Nick’s Head National Historic Reserve

=== Hawke's Bay Region ===
- Heipipi Pa Historic Reserve
- Mangaone Caves Historic Reserve
- Mangaone Caves Scenic Reserve
- Otatara Pa Historic Reserve
- Te Heru o Tūreia Historic Reserve
- Tiwaewae Memorial Reserve Historic Reserve
- Whangawehi Coronation Reserve

=== Taranaki Region ===
- Awa te Take Pa Historic Reserve
- Kawau Pa Historic Reserve
- Mahoetahi Historic Reserve
- Marsland Hill Historic Reserve
- Omata Stockade Historic Reserve
- Pou Tehia Historic Reserve
- Pukerangiora Pa Historic Reserve
- Puketakauere Pa Historic Reserve
- Puketarata-Parihamore Historic Reserve
- Sentry Hill Redoubt Historic Reserve
- St George's Redoubt Historic Reserve
- Tapuinikau Pa Historic Reserve
- Tataraimaka Pa Historic Reserve
- Tataraimaka / St George’s Redoubt Historic Reserve
- Tataraimaka Urupā Historic Reserve
- Taumata Historic Reserve
- Te Koru Pa Historic Reserve

=== Manawatū-Whanganu Region ===
- Moutoa Gardens Historic Reserve
- Tikirere Mill Race Historic Reserve

=== Wellington Region ===
- Government Buildings Historic Reserve
- Matiu Historic Reserve
- Shield's Flat Stone Walls Historic Reserve
- Turnbull House Historic Reserve

== South Island ==
=== Tasman District ===
- Belgrove Windmill Historic Reserve
- Parapara Peninsula Historic Reserve
- Six Mile Historic Reserve

=== Nelson District ===
- Albion Square Historic Reserve

=== Marlborough District ===
- Horahora-kakahu Historic Reserve
- Rai Valley Pioneer Cottage
- Ship Cove Historic Reserve

=== West Coast Region ===
- Blacks Point Historic Reserve
- Denniston Historic Reserve
- Donovans Store Historic Reserve
- Hatters Terrace Historic Reserve
- Jacks Mill School Kotuku Historic Reserve
- Lyell Historic Reserve
- Mahinapua Creek Rail Bridge Historic Reserve
- Okarito School House Historic Reserve
- Reefton Historic Courthouse Reserve
- Reefton School Of Mines Historic Reserve
- Ross Goldsfields Historic Reserve
- Ross Historic Cemetery Reserve
- Seddon House Historic Reserve
- Te Ana o Matuku Historic Reserve

=== Canterbury Region ===
- Britomart Memorial Historic Reserve
- Cairn Of Peace
- Coronation Hill Historic Reserve
- Cotons Cob Cottage Historic Reserve
- Jeanie Collier Grave Site Reserve
- Kakahu Lime Kiln Historic Reserve
- Kapuatohe Historic Reserve
- Monavale Historic Reserve
- Nga Niho Pa Historic Reserve
- Ō Tamakura Historic Reserve
- Raincliff Historic Reserve
- Ripapa Island Historic Reserve
- Te Puke-ki-wiataha
- Transit Of Venus Historic Reserve
- Weka Pass Historic Reserve

=== Otago Region ===
- Alexandra Courthouse Historic Reserve
- Arrowtown Chinese Settlement Historic Reserve
- Arrowtown Gaol Historic Reserve
- Atleys Terrace Historic Reserve
- Bannockburn Post Office Historic Reserve
- Bannockburn Sluicings Historic Reserve
- Bendigo Bake House Historic Reserve
- Bendigo Historic Reserve
- Coal Pit Saddle Historic Reserve
- Dead Horse Pinch Historic Reserve
- Earnscleugh Dredge Tailings Historic Reserve
- Gabriel Read Memorial Historic Reserve
- Gabriels Gully Historic Reserve
- Golden Point Historic Reserve
- Horseshoe Bend Cemetery Historic Reserve
- Invincible Mine Historic Reserve
- Katiki Point Historic Reserve
- Kawarau Bridge Historic Reserve
- Kotahitanga Church Historic Reserve
- Macetown Historic Reserve
- Mitchell's Cottage Historic Reserve
- Murphys Flat Historic Reserve
- Nine Mile Historic Reserve
- Onewhenua Historic Reserve
- Pioneer Stream Historic Reserve
- Quartz Reef Point Historic Reserve
- Queenstown Astronomical Historic Reserve
- Shek Harn Historic Reserve
- Sir John McKenzie Memorial Historic Reserve
- St Bathans Hall Historic Reserve
- St Bathans Post Office Historic Reserve
- Te-U-Mukuri Historic Reserve
- Town of Nenthorn Historic Reserve
- Young Australian Historic Reserve

=== Southland Region ===
- Muddy Gully Historic Reserve
- Sand Hill Point Historic Reserve
- Tākerehaka Historic Reserve
