= Scientific reserves of New Zealand =

A scientific reserve is a type of New Zealand protected area owned by the New Zealand Government and administered by the Department of Conservation as an area for scientific research and education.

Scientific reserves are established under the Reserves Act 1977 " for the purpose of protecting and preserving in perpetuity for scientific study, research, education, and the benefit of the country, ecological associations, plant or animal communities, types of soil, geomorphological phenomena, and like matters of special interest.".

Land Information New Zealand lists 51 recreation reserves on its website. Entry to part of all of these reserves is limited to those with specific permits.
