= Hāpūpū / J M Barker Historic Reserve =

National reserve on Chatham Island, New Zealand

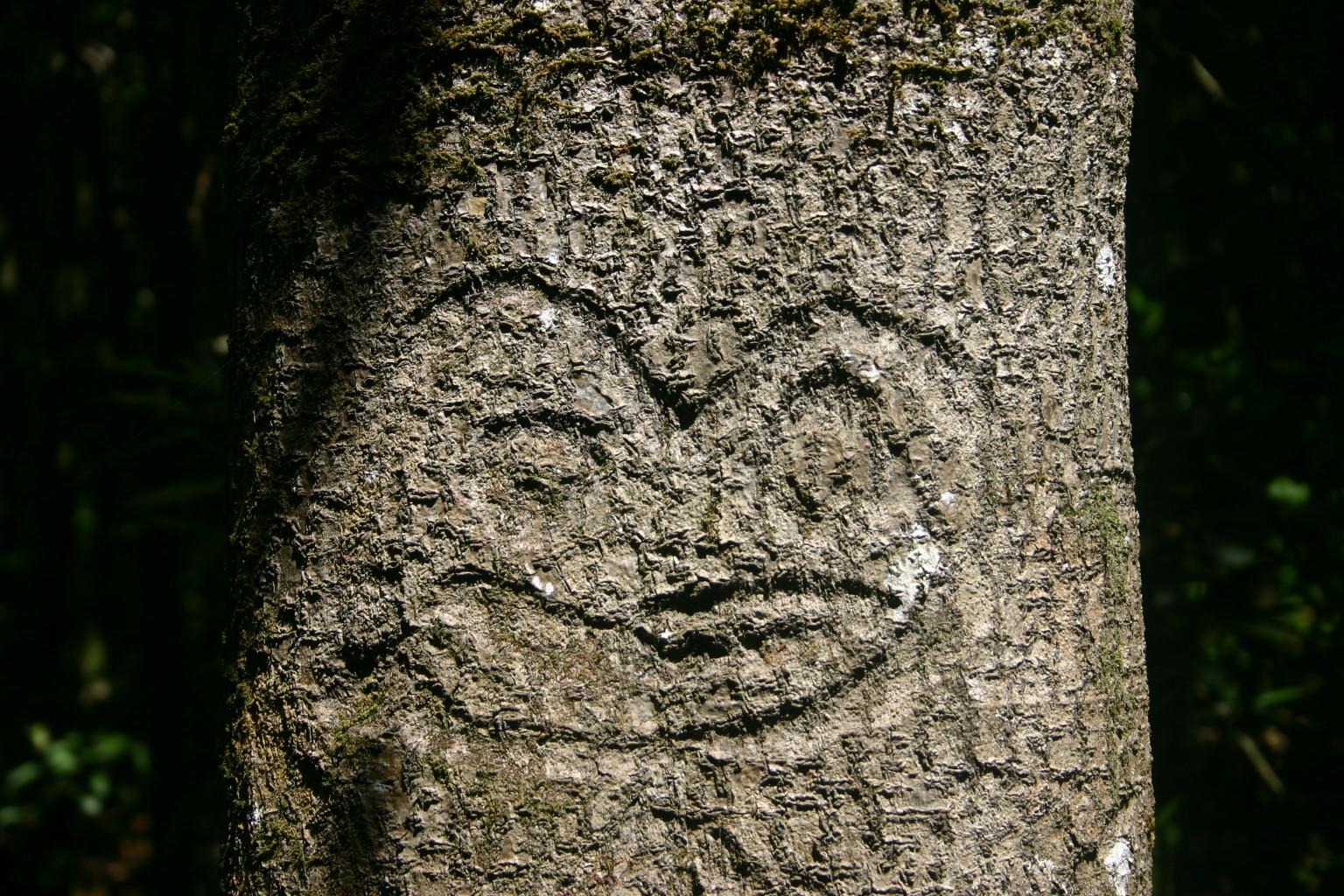
- A Moriori tree carving or dendroglyph at the reserve
- Interactive map of Hāpūpū / J M Barker Historic Reserve
- Nearest city: Waitangi (town)
- Coordinates: 43.8003°S 176.3528°W
- Established: 1996
- Administrator: Department of Conservation

Hāpūpū / J M Barker Historic Reserve is one of three national historic reserves in New Zealand. It is located close to Hanson Bay at the north-eastern end of Chatham Island, the main island of the Chatham Islands. It was created in 1979 following a gift of land from a local business. This was done to protect 33 hectares of kōpi (karaka or Corynocarpus laevigatus) forest containing Moriori tree carvings called rākau momori (or dendroglyphs). In 1996, the reserve was officially designated as a national historic reserve, owing to the site's significance as a representation of Moriori traditions.

== History ==
Hāpūpū was given to the New Zealand government in 1979 by J. M. Barker. It is one of three national historic reserves in New Zealand. The historic reserve designation reflects the particular importance of Hāpūpū culturally and spiritually for the Moriori of the Chatham Islands.

The rākau momori are among the few remaining visible signs of pre-European-contact Moriori culture. The carvings depict Moriori karapuna (ancestors) and symbols of the natural world, such as patiki (flounder) and the hopo (albatross). In a late 1998 review, 82 trees with carvings were found. Numbers of rākau momori have been steadily declining due to the ageing of the host trees, stock grazing, wind and, in earlier years, people removing the carvings as souvenirs.

The reserve was fenced in 1980 to provide protection for the tree carvings from grazing stock and this is now showing very good recovery. Planning is underway between the Department of Conservation (DOC) and the Moriori people to secure a small portion of the reserve for contemporary Moriori carvers to begin a new generation of rākau momori.

Barker Bros recently sold most of their remaining farmland, including that which surrounds Hāpūpū, to Hokotehi Moriori Trust, the mandated body responsible for Moriori assets, acquisitions and negotiations.

The rākau momori have been the subject of much debate throughout the years mainly about the purpose behind them. One author has even released a book in 2007 in which he broadly claims that the carvings depict mainly birds and has even given these carvings a new name "manu moriori" which could be translated to mean bird people. Chatham Island Moriori representatives are not supportive of the release or sale of this book. Moriori do not consider themselves to be "Bird People".

The only recorded example of a Moriori committing a carving to a tree on the Chatham Islands dates back to the 1840s, when a Moriori carved a tree on Pitt Island after burying his murdered wife and child next to it. This example also has no relevance to birds.
