= National reserves of New Zealand =

Area of national importance

A national reserve in New Zealand is an area that has been designated as having national importance under section 13 of the Reserves Act 1977. They are administered by the Department of Conservation.

== Legislation ==
Section 13 of the Reserves Act 1977 ("Governor-General may declare reserve to be national reserve") deals with national reserves. It is outlined that the governor-general can, through Order in Council (i.e. a process by which a government's decision is given effect) and made on recommendation by the minister (i.e. the Minister of Conservation, as that minister is responsible for the Department of Conservation), declare national reserves.

== Existing national reserves ==
There are three national historic reserves:

- Hāpūpū / J M Barker Historic Reserve, Chatham Islands – containing Moriori tree carvings
- Puhi Kai Iti / Cook Landing Site National Historic Reserve, Kaiti, Gisborne – where Captain James Cook first landed in New Zealand in 1769
- Te Kuri a Paoa/Young Nick’s Head National Historic Reserve – made a national reserve by the Ngai Tāmanuhiri Claims Settlement Act 2012, per section 13 of the Reserves Act 1977

National nature reserves include:

- Antipodes Islands National Nature Reserve
- Auckland Islands National Nature Reserve
- Bounty Islands National Nature Reserve
- Campbell Islands National Nature Reserve
- Snares Islands National Nature Reserve

Other national reserves include:

- Lewis Pass National Scenic Reserve – gazetted in 1981

The historic reserves are small reserves with historic value. The Lewis Pass reserve is much larger (13,737 hectares), with conservation values, including parts with scenic and ecological values. The Subantarctic Islands are collectively a UNESCO World Heritage Site.

== Other areas ==
The area known as the Waitangi National Reserve, where the Treaty of Waitangi was signed, is not a national reserve, despite its name. The area has never been a national reserve (or any other kind of reserve) under the Reserves Act. It has always been administered by the Waitangi National Trust Board under the Waitangi National Trust Board Act 1932.

Takapūneke is the site of an 1830 massacre adjacent to present-day Akaroa. The historical significance has not always been known and in 1960, Akaroa County built a sewage treatment plant in the area that was the core of the kāinga. In 2018, Christchurch City Council asked the Minister of Conservation to declare Takapūneke Reserve a national reserve.

== See also ==
- Protected areas of New Zealand
