= Nature reserves of New Zealand =

Conservation areas managed by the New Zealand government

A nature reserve is a type of New Zealand protected area owned by the New Zealand Government and administered by the Department of Conservation to protect natural features.

Nature reserves are established under the Reserves Act 1977 "for the purpose of protecting and preserving in perpetuity indigenous flora or fauna or natural features that are of such rarity, scientific interest or importance, or so unique that their protection and preservation are in the public interest".

Land Information New Zealand lists 51 recreation reserves on its website.
