= Fäbodristning =

Type of historic carvings found in Sweden

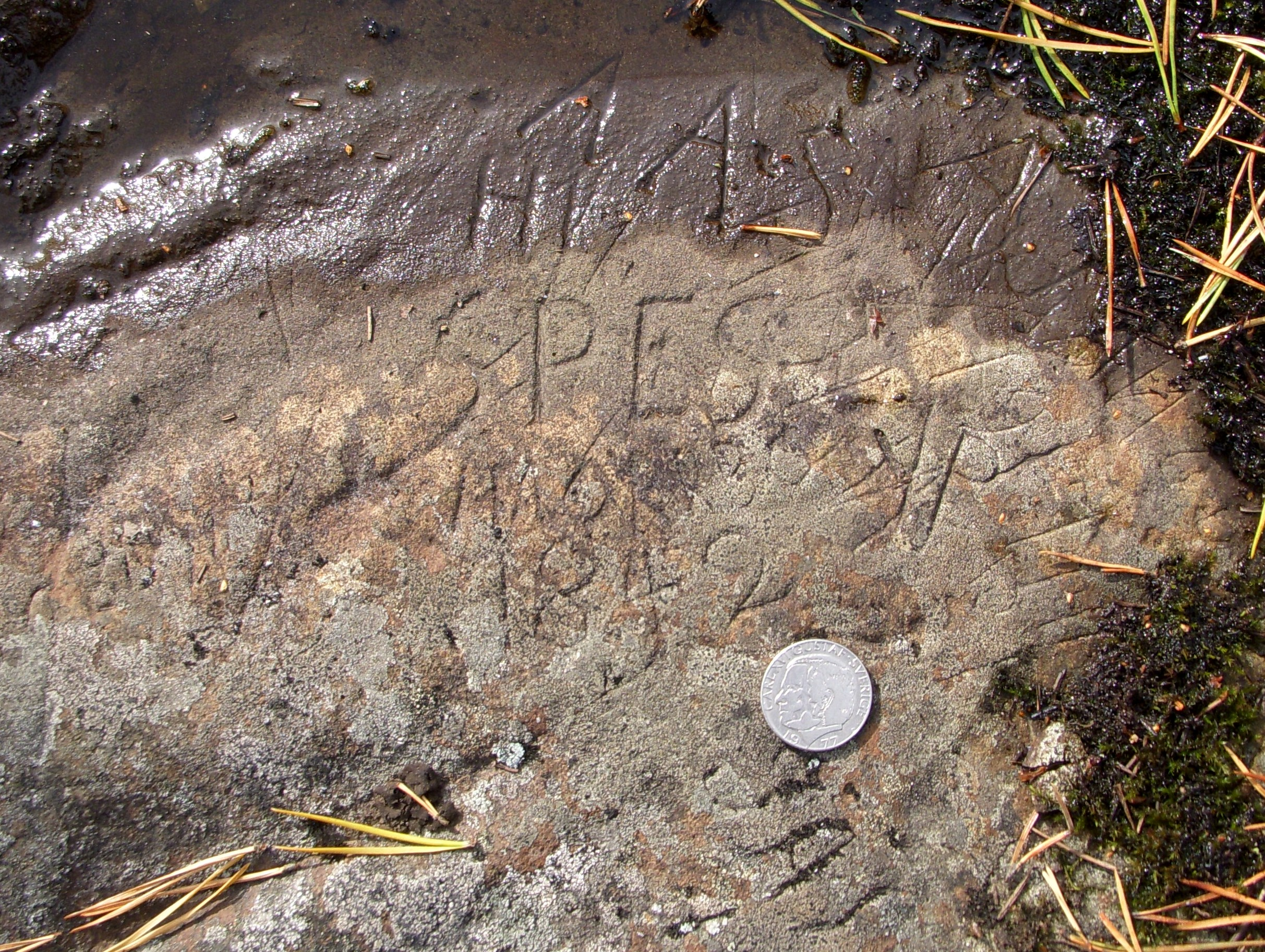
- Vallgångsristning at Hästbergs klack from 1842. Photographer placed a 1 krona coin for comparison in size
- Type: Graffiti
- Material: Wood and stone
- Writing: Elfdalian in Dalecarlian runes and Latin script
- Created: 17th century – 1910
- Present location: Dalarna, Sweden
- Culture: Elfdalian

Fäbodristningar or vallgångsristningar are carvings on trees and mountains with text, symbols, runes, figures, initials and other signs, that have been found in Sweden in connection with the herding of animals in the 17th century and onward, mainly left by youths who worked with the herding.

== Origins ==
In Dalarna, Sweden, a few hundred carvings have been found, most of them in the Ore area (in Rättvik Municipality) of the region. The carvings were made with a knife and often followed the same pattern of initials, year, and often information about them, importantly the first or last day of the fäbod (summer pasture) period.

The carvings are mostly concentrated in certain locations and areas such as hills and close to the water as they were good places for herding in the north of Sweden. One of these places are Hästbergs klack north of Ludvika. At times, a review of the herding period such as "Good" or "Bad" were found. On one tree branch in Ore, Dalarna, three girls who herded left a carving saying "We feel good as hell" (Wi mår bra som fan). It was customary that women made carvings on trees, while men made them on stones.

== See also ==
- List of runestones
- Arborglyph
- Dalecarlian runes
- Petroglyph
- Hobo signs
