= Kapowai River =

River in New Zealand

Coordinates: 36.911431°S 175.698626°E

Location
- Country: New Zealand

Physical characteristics
- Mouth
  - location: Whitianga Harbour
- Length: 15 km (9.3 mi)

The Kapowai River is a river in the Waikato region of New Zealand. It is located on the Coromandel Peninsula, and flows north from its source inland from Tairua, reaching the sea at Whitianga Harbour

== See also ==
- List of rivers of New Zealand
