= Whenuakura River =

Coordinates: 39°47′S 174°31′E

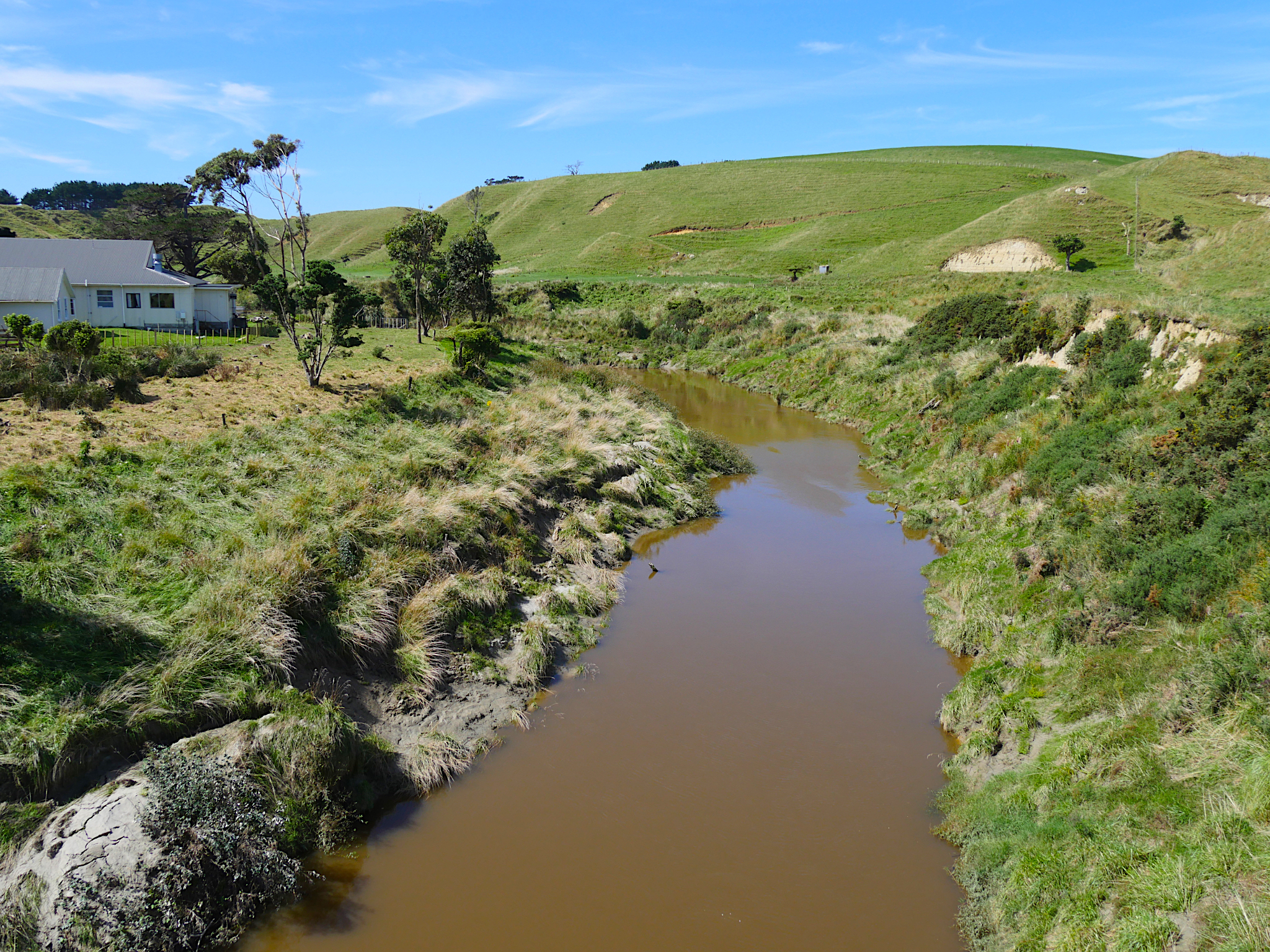

Location
- Country: New Zealand

Physical characteristics
- Mouth
  - location: South Taranaki Bight
- Length: 53 km (33 mi)

The Whenuakura River is a river of the Taranaki Region of New Zealand's North Island. It flows south from its origins northeast of Lake Rotorangi and reaches the coast five kilometres southeast of Pātea.

== See also ==
- List of rivers of New Zealand
