= Recreation reserve =

Type of protected area in New Zealand

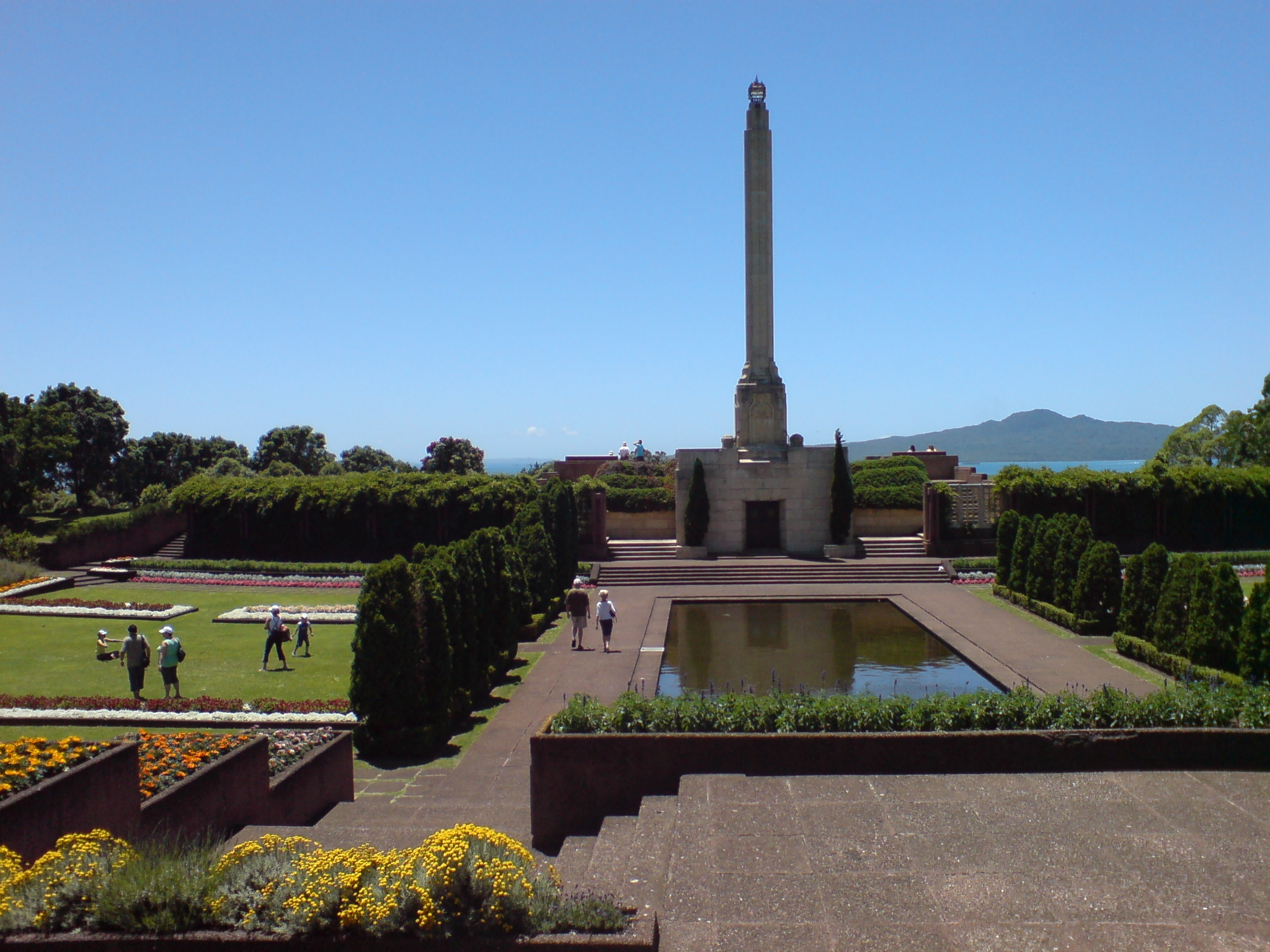
Bastion Point Recreation Reserve at Auckland's Bastion Point

A recreation reserve is a type of New Zealand protected area owned by the New Zealand Government and reserved mainly for sporting or recreational activities. Many provide public access to coastlines, lakes and rivers. Some are administered by the Department of Conservation.

Each recreation reserve has been established "for the purpose of providing areas for the recreation and sporting activities and the physical welfare and enjoyment of the public, and for the protection of the natural environment and beauty of the countryside, with emphasis on the retention of open spaces and on outdoor recreational activities, including recreational tracks in the countryside".

There were 2,842 recreation reserves in New Zealand in 2015, covering total of 255,750 hectares. Land Information New Zealand listed 599 recreation reserves on its website in 2022.

Most recreation reserves are smaller than 1000 hectares, but some are much larger. Te Paki in Northland, for example, covers nearly 19,000 hectares of coastal landscape. Pūponga Farm Park, at the western end of Farewell Spit, is also larger than most. Other well-known recreation reserves include Pelorus Bridge and the reserves of the Marlborough Sounds, and Five Mile, Whakaipo, and other reserves around Lake Taupō.

== North Island ==
=== Northland Region ===
- Ahipara Recreation Reserve
- Arai-Te-Uru Recreation Reserve
- Bland Bay Recreation Reserve
- Flagstaff Hill Recreation Reserve
- Hauparua Inlet Recreation Reserve
- Hongi Hika Recreation Reserve
- Hukatere Hall Recreation Reserve
- Kaiwaka Park Domain Recreation Reserve
- Kawakawa Domain Recreation Reserve
- Kerikeri Basin Recreation Reserve
- Koutu Point Recreation Reserve
- Lake Ngākeketo Recreation Reserve
- Lake Ngatu Recreation Reserve
- Langs Beach Recreation Reserve
- Maitai Bay Recreation Reserve
- Mangapai Domain Recreation Reserve
- Mangonui Domain Recreation Reserve
- Mangonui Recreation Reserve
- Marua Recreation Reserve
- Matauwhi Bay Recreation Reserve
- Matauwhi Road Recreation Reserve
- Maungakaramea Domain Recreation Reserve
- Motuarohia Island Recreation Reserve
- Motu Kiore Island Recreation Reserve
- Motutara Recreation Reserve
- Oakura Beach Domain Recreation Reserve
- Ocean Beach Recreation Reserve
- Otamure Recreation Reserve
- Otehei Bay Recreation Reserve
- Pahi Domain Recreation Reserve
- Paparahi Point Recreation Reserve
- Parakao Domain Recreation Reserve
- Parnell Street Recreation Reserve
- Pataua Island Recreation Reserve
- Pitt Street Recreation Reserve
- Puwheke Recreation Reserve
- Ruakaka Domain Recreation Reserve
- Signal Station Road Recreation Reserve
- Springfield Domain Recreation Reserve
- Taronui Bay Recreation Reserve
- Taumarumaru Recreation Reserve
- Te Paki Recreation Reserve
- Titipu Island Recreation Reserve
- Tutukaka Recreation Reserve
- Uretiti Recreation Reserve
- Urupukapuka Island Recreation Reserve
- Waewaetorea Island Recreation Reserve
- Waikiekie Domain Recreation Reserve
- Waimamaku Hall Site Recreation Reserve
- Waiotira Domain Recreation Reserve
- Waipu Cove Domain Recreation Reserve
- Whakanekeneke Recreation Reserve
- Whananaki South Recreation Reserve
- Whareora Recreation Reserve
- Whatitiri Domain Recreation Reserve

=== Auckland Region ===
- Auckland Mataatua Society Marae Recreation Reserve
- Awana Bay Recreation Reserve
- Awana Stream Recreation Reserve
- Bastion Point Recreation Reserve
- Beehive Island Recreation Reserve
- Browns Island Recreation Reserve
- Bushs Beach Recreation Reserve
- Claris Recreation Reserve
- Drury Creek Islands Recreation Reserve
- Fitzroy Bay Landing Recreation Reserve
- Harataonga Recreation Reserve
- Hilltop Recreation Reserve
- Kaipara Hills Recreation Reserve
- Leigh Recreation Reserve
- Kaipara Hills Recreation Reserve
- Leigh Recreation Reserve
- Mahurangi Park Recreation Reserve
- Medlands Recreation Reserve
- Motuihe Island Recreation Reserve
- Motuora Island Recreation Reserve
- Motutapu Island Recreation Reserve
- Okiwi Recreation Reserve
- Oruawharo Creek Recreation Reserve
- Pa Point Recreation Reserve
- Rakino Island Recreation Reserve
- Schoolhouse Bay Recreation Reserve
- Spectacle Lake Recreation Reserve
- Stony Beach Recreation Reserve
- Stony Hill Recreation Reserve
- Te Henga Recreation Reserve
- Thorne Bay Recreation Reserve

=== Bay of Plenty Region ===
- Aongatete Recreation Reserve
- Arikikapakapa Recreation Reserve
- Galatea Recreation Reserve
- Hamurana Springs Recreation Reserve
- Hukutaia Domain Recreation Reserve
- Island View Recreation Reserve
- Kutarere Recreation Reserve
- Lake Rerewhakaaitu Recreation Reserve
- Lower Kaimai Domain Recreation Reserve
- Matata Recreation Reserve
- Mount Maunganui Domain Recreation Reserve
- Murupara Domain Recreation Reserve
- Ohinekoao Recreation Reserve
- Ohope Recreation Reserve
- Oruaiti Beach Recreation Reserve
- Otao Domain Recreation Reserve
- Port Ohope Recreation Reserve
- Pukeroa Recreation Reserve
- Rotorua Domain Recreation Reserve
- Tarawera River Recreation Reserve
- Te Ngae Junction Recreation Reserve
- Te Tapahoro Recreation Reserve
- Te Teko Recreation Reserve
- Tikitapu Recreation Reserve
- Waimana Recreation Reserve

=== Gisborne Region ===
- Anaura Bay Recreation Reserve
- Cleary Road Recreation Reserve
- Donners Bush Recreation Reserve
- Ormond Kohi Bush Recreation Reserve
- Waipiro Bay Recreation Reserve

=== Hawke's Bay Region ===
- Clive Grange Recreation Reserve
- Elsthorpe Domain Recreation Reserve
- Farndon Park Domain
- Glenfalls Recreation Reserve
- Hatuma Domain Recreation Reserve
- Hutchinson Domain Recreation Reserve
- Kotemaori Domain Recreation Reserve
- Morere Recreation Reserve
- Putorino Domain Recreation Reserve
- Te Kuta Recreation Reserve
- Te Pohue Upper Mohaka Recreation Reserve
- Tutira Domain Recreation Reserve
- Waitara / Glenfalls Recreation Reserve

=== Manawatū-Whanganui Region ===
- Aramoana Domain Recreation Reserve
- Broadway Recreation Reserve
- Dews Road Recreation Reserve
- Erua Recreation Reserve
- Harbour Recreation Reserve
- Junction Recreation Reserve
- Karioi Domain Recreation Reserve
- Kiosk Recreation Reserve
- Kiwi Road Recreation Reserve
- Koitiata Domain Recreation Reserve
- Kumeroa Domain Recreation Reserve
- Manawatu Recreation Reserve
- Manganui o te Ao Recreation Reserve
- Manganui Valley Recreation Reserve
- Mangaweka Recreation Reserve
- Marton Golf Club Recreation Reserve
- Matamau Recreation Reserve
- Mikonui Memorial Recreation Reserve
- Niho Domain Recreation Reserve
- Nukumaru Recreation Reserve
- Ohinepane Recreation Reserve
- Ongarue Recreation Reserve
- Owhango Domain Recreation Reserve
- Pohangina Valley Domain Recreation Reserve
- Poukiore Recreation Reserve
- South Street Recreation Reserve
- Taihape Recreation Reserve
- Tangimoana Dunes Recreation Reserve
- Taringamotu Recreation Reserve
- Taumarunui/Rangaroa Recreation Reserve
- Torere Recreation Reserve
- Tui Domain Recreation Reserve
- Turakina Recreation Reserve
- Victoria Domain Recreation Reserve
- Wahipai Recreation Reserve
- Waihemo Recreation Reserve

== South Island ==
=== Nelson District ===
- Aniseed Valley Recreation Reserve
- Boulder Bank Recreation Reserve
- Cable Bay Recreation Reserve

=== Marlborough District ===
- Bankhouse Recreation Reserve
- Bay Of Many Coves Recreation Reserve
- Betty Archer Recreation Reserve
- Blind River Recreation Reserve
- Bulwer Recreation Reserve
- Camp Bay Recreation Reserve
- Carluke Recreation Reserve
- Elaine Bay Recreation Reserve
- Endeavour Inlet Recreation Reserve
- Four Fathom Bay Recreation Reserve
- French Pass Recreation Reserve
- Governors Bay Recreation Reserve
- Grovetown Recreation Reserve
- Hakahaka Bay Recreation Reserve
- Havelock Recreation Reserve
- Karaka Point Recreation Reserve
- Kart Raceway Recreation Reserve
- King-Turner Scenic Reserve
- Koromiko Recreation Reserve
- Lake Grassmere Recreation Reserve
- Lochmara West Bay Recreation Reserve
- Marfells Beach Recreation Reserve
- Mistletoe Bay Recreation Reserve
- Moenui Recreation Reserve
- Molesworth Recreation Reserve
- Momorangi Bay Recreation Reserve
- Ngakuta Bay Recreation Reserve
- Nydia Bay Recreation Reserve
- Okiwi Bay Recreation Reserve
- Okoha Recreation Reserve
- Opua Bay Recreation Reserve
- Pelorus Bridge Recreation Reserve
- Picton Botanic Reserve
- Picton Recreation Reserve
- Pipi Beach Recreation Reserve
- Portage Bay Recreation Reserve
- Rarangi Recreation Reserve
- Ratimera Bay Recreation Reserve
- Red Point Recreation Reserve
- Robin Hood Bay Recreation Reserve
- Ronga Recreation Reserve
- Round Hill Recreation Reserve
- Ruakaka Recreation Reserve
- Seddon Recreation Reserve
- Tawa Bay Recreation Reserve
- Taylor Dam Recreation Reserve
- Tipi Bay Recreation Reserve
- Titirangi Farm Park
- Waimaru Recreation and Scenic Reserve
- Waitohi Stream Recreation Reserve
- Wakaterepapanui Island Recreation Reserve
- Whangarae Bay Recreation Reserve
- Wharehunga Bay Recreation Reserve
- Whatamango Bay Recreation Reserve
- Whatanihi Recreation Reserve
- Whites Bay Recreation Reserve

=== Canterbury Region ===
- Admirals Scenic Reserve
- Arundel Recreation Reserve
- Caledonian Sports Ground
- Campbell Park Recreation Reserve
- Carleton Domain Reserve
- Cattle Creek Recreation Reserve
- Cave Recreation Reserve
- Clarkville Hall Recreation Reserve
- Conway River Recreation Reserve
- Courtenay Recreation Reserve
- Darfield Domain
- Ellesmere Recreation Reserve
- Goose Bay-Omihi Recreation Reserve
- Greendale Recreation Reserve
- Hammond Point Recreation Reserve
- Horomaka Island Recreation Reserve
- Hundalee Recreation Reserve
- King-Turner Scenic Reserve
- Kongutu Recreation Reserve
- Kowhai Pass Recreation Reserve
- Lake Grasmere Recreation Reserve
- Lake Wardell Recreation Reserve
- Le Bons Bay Recreation Reserve
- Lees Valley Recreation Reserve
- Lincoln Park Recreation Reserve
- Little Akaloa Recreation Reserve
- Loch Katrine Recreation Reserve
- Mead Recreation Reserve
- Molesworth Recreation Reserve
- Morven Recreation Reserve
- Mount Nessing Recreation Reserve
- Oaro Recreation Reserve
- Ohoka Stream Recreation Reserve
- Okains Bay Domain Recreation Reserve
- Okains Bay Recreation Reserve
- Omihi Recreation Reserve
- Orari Park Recreation Reserve
- Otamatapaio Recreation Reserve
- Otarama Recreation Reserve
- Oxford Domain Recreation Reserve
- Petit Carenage Recreation Reserve
- Pigeon Bay Domain
- Pleasant Point Recreation Reserve
- Pleasant Valley Recreation Reserve
- Pukerauaruhe Island Recreation Reserve
- Quail Island Recreation Reserve
- Rangitata Recreation Reserve
- Rat Island Recreation Reserve
- Rosewill Recreation Reserve
- Ruapuna Recreation Reserve
- Sage Recreation Reserve
- Sheffield Recreation Reserve
- Springston Recreation Reserve
- Tekapo Domain
- Rat Island Recreation Reserve
- Rosewill Recreation Reserve
- Ruapuna Recreation Reserve
- Sage Recreation Reserve
- Sheffield Recreation Reserve
- Springston Recreation Reserve
- Tekapo Domain
- Temuka Recreation Reserve
- Upper Waitohi Recreation Reserve
- Waiau Rivermouth Recreation Reserve
- Waihora Park Recreation Reserve
- Waikari Recreation Reserve
- Wainui Domain
- Waitohi Bush Recreation Reserve
- Woodend Beach Recreation Reserve Youth Holiday and Recreation

=== Otago Region ===
- Abbots Creek Recreation Reserve
- Alexandra Lakeside Recreation Reserve
- Allans Beach Recreation Reserve
- Aramoana Recreation Reserve
- Ascot Road Recreation Reserve
- Awamoko Recreation Reserve
- Ballantynes Road Recreation Reserve
- Beach Bay Recreation Reserve
- Berwick Recreation Reserve
- Blanket Bay - Meiklejohns Bay Recreation Reserve
- Blanket Bay Recreation Reserve
- Blue Lake Recreation Reserve
- Bobs Cove Recreation Reserve
- Brighton Recreation Reserve
- Broad Bay Recreation Reserve
- Butchers Dam Recreation Reserve
- Casa Nova Park
- Catlins Heads Recreation Reserve
- Chard Road Recreation Reserve
- Clutha Riverbank (Clyde) Recreation Reserve
- Clyde Recreation Reserve
- Clyde Town Belt
- Coronet Peak Recreation Reserve
- Craighall Crescent Recreation Reserve
- Damper Bay Lakeside Recreation Reserve
- Daniel O'Connell Recreation Reserve
- Danseys Pass Recreation Reserve
- Diamond Lake Recreation Reserve
- Doctors Point Recreation Reserve
- Dublin Bay-Outlet-Albert Town Recreation Reserve
- Dublin Bay Recreation Reserve
- Earnslaw Burn Recreation Reserve
- Earnslaw Park Recreation Reserve
- False Islet Recreation Reserve
- Frankton Arm Recreation Reserve
- Frankton Golf Course
- Frankton Recreation Reserve
- Fraser River Recreation Reserve
- Geordie Hill Recreation Reserve
- Glendhu Bay Recreation Reserve
- Glenorchy Recreation Reserve
- Glenorchy Road Recreation Reserve
- Gorge Creek Recreation Reserve
- Greenstone Road Recreation Reserve
- Harwood Recreation Reserve
- Hawea Recreation Reserve
- Hills Creek Recreation Reserve
- Johns Creek Recreation Reserve
- Kawarau Falls Recreation Reserve
- Kawarau Gorge Mining Centre
- Kawarau Gorge Recreation Reserve
- Kingston Recreation Reserve
- Kuri Bush Recreation Reserve
- Kuriiti Creek Recreation Reserve
- Kyeburn Recreation Reserve
- Lake Hawea-Western Shore Recreation Reserve
- Lake Kirkpatrick Recreation Reserve
- Lake Rere Recreation Reserve
- Lake Road Recreation Reserve
- Larch View Recreation Reserve
- Long Beach Recreation Reserve
- Macraes Recreation Reserve
- Mahaka Recreation Reserve
- Maniototo Park Recreation Reserve
- Manorburn Dam Recreation Reserve
- Matakaea Recreation Reserve
- Matakanui Recreation Reserve
- Millers Flat Recreation Reserve
- Moke Lake Recreation Reserve
- Morning Star Beach Recreation Reserve
- Motutapu Recreation Reserve
- Mt Alfred Recreation Reserve
- Mt Aurum Recreation Reserve
- Naseby Golf Course Recreation Reserve
- North Otago War Memorial Reserve
- Oamaru Recreation Reserve (Oamaru Racecourse)
- Otago Central Rail Trail
- Oturehua Recreation Reserve
- Oxenbridge Tunnel Recreation Reserve
- Paerau Recreation Reserve
- Papatowai Recreation Reserve
- Patearoa Recreation Reserve
- Pomahaka River Recreation Reserve
- Portobello Recreation Reserve
- Prospect, Woodhaugh, Botanical Gardens
- Quarantine Island/Kamau Taurua Recreation Reserve
- Queenstown-Glenorchy Road Recreation Reserve
- Rastus Burn Recreation Reserve
- Riverside Recreation Reserve
- Roaring Meg Recreation Reserve
- Rotary Park Recreation Reserve
- Ruby Island Recreation Reserve
- Sandymount Recreation Reserve
- Seaton Square Recreation Reserve
- Seven Mile Recreation Reserve
- Shag Point Recreation Reserve
- Slope Hill Recreation Reserve
- St Bathans Recreation Reserve
- St Clair Recreation Reserve
- Taieri Historical Park
- Taieri Lake Recreation Reserve
- Taieri Mouth Recreation Reserve
- Tapanui Recreation Reserve
- Thames Highway-Frome Street Recreation Reserve
- Timaru Creek Recreation Reserve
- Tokomairiro Recreation Reserve
- Truby King Recreation Reserve
- Tuapeka Mouth Recreation Reserve
- Tuapeka Recreation Reserve
- Tuckers Beach Recreation Reserve
- Tweed Street Recreation Reserve
- Twelve Mile Delta Recreation Reserve
- Twenty Five Mile Creek Recreation Reserve
- Waihemo Recreation Reserve
- Waihola Recreation Reserve
- Waikouaiti Racecourse
- Waikouaiti Recreation Reserve
- Waikouaiti Sports Ground
- Waterfall Creek Recreation Reserve
- Wedderburn Recreation Reserve
- Westwood Recreation Reserve
- Wharf Creek Recreation Reserve
- Whitechapel Flat Recreation Reserve
- Willsher Bay Recreation Reserve
- Wilsons Bay Recreation Reserve
