= Rough River (New Zealand) =

Coordinates: 42.280334°S 171.650084°E

Otututu (Rough) River

Location
- Country: New Zealand

Physical characteristics
- Source
  - location: Paparoa Range
- Mouth
  - location: Grey River
- Length: 35 km (22 mi)

The Rough River, alternatively known as the Otututu River is a river of the West Coast Region of New Zealand's South Island. A major tributary of the Grey River, it flows south from its sources near Mount Uriah in the Paparoa Range 20 kilometres southeast of Charleston, to reach the Grey River to the southwest of the settlement of Ikamatua. The river is currently shown on maps as Otututu (Rough) River, although this orthography is no longer common for New Zealand Rivers.

== See also ==
- List of rivers of New Zealand
