= Puhi Kai Iti / Cook Landing Site =

Monument in Gisborne, New Zealand

Puhi Kai Iti / Cook Landing National Historic Reserve
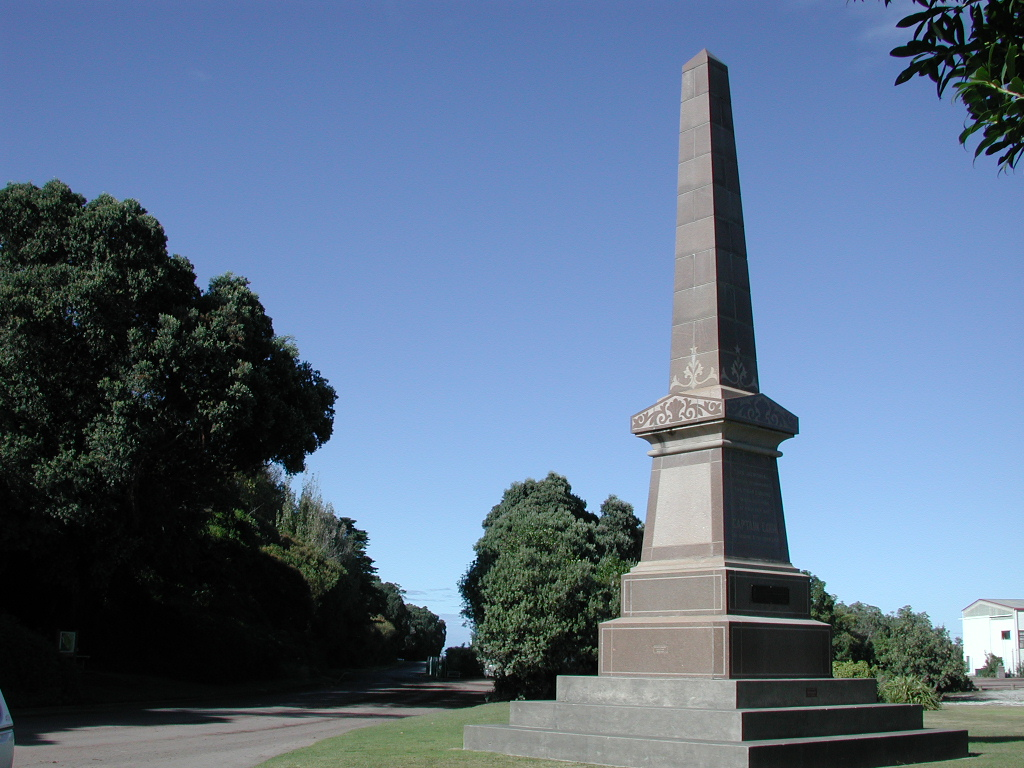
- 1906 monument in the historic reserve to Cook's landing

- Location within New Zealand
- Nearest city: Gisborne
- Coordinates: 38.6754°S 178.0256°E
- Established: 1990
- Administrator: Department of Conservation

Heritage New Zealand – Category 1
- Designated: 15 February 1990
- Reference no.: 3473

Puhi Kai Iti / Cook Landing National Historic Reserve commemorates the arrival of both Māori and Pākehā in New Zealand. The Cook Monument, unveiled in 1906, was intended to mark the location where James Cook first landed on the islands in 1769 during his first voyage. The granite obelisk monument is now "barely within sight or scent of the sea", as the shoreline was altered by land reclamation as part of expansion at the port of nearby Gisborne. The reserve is one of three national historic reserves in New Zealand.

In 1966, the New Zealand Historic Places Trust successfully negotiated to have the area surrounding the monument and a strip of land to the sea set aside as a reserve. It was designated as a national historic reserve in 1990. In 2019 it underwent a significant renovation to include recognition of Horouta and Te Ikaroa-a-Rauru, two large ocean-going waka that first brought Māori to the area in the 13th or 14th century. As part of this redevelopment, the reserve was renamed to its current dual name form. The Cook monument itself is a Heritage New Zealand Category I listed historic place, in addition to its status as part of a national historic reserve.

== History ==
In te ao Māori (roughly equivalent to Māori customs and culture), the migratory waka upon which their ancestors arrived in New Zealand can often form part of a person's identity. According to oral traditions, Horouta and Te Ikaroa-a-Rauru are two such waka which arrived in Tūranganui-a-Kiwa during the 13th or 14th centuries, and mark some of the earliest human habitation in that region – with the region's name honouring Kīwa, the navigator of Horouta. The name Puhi Kai Iti comes from one of the feathered streamers on the sternpost of Te Ikaroa-a-Rauru, which was said to have been laid on the shore after settlement and a whare wānanga (learning house) built on top, where Māia – the navigator of Te Ikaroa-a-Rauru – taught traditional knowledge from their original homeland. These waka have maintained their significance to local iwi, forming a core part of the settlement story of the region.

The specific location of the reserve is near the site where British explorer James Cook first set foot in New Zealand as part of his first voyage to the Pacific in 1769. The expedition sighted New Zealand on 7 October 1769, making landfall two days later. Cook's party landed near the eastern bank of the Tūranganui river, attempting to cross the river when they sighted a group of Māori on the far side. Despite initial hopes for a friendly encounter, a series of miscommunications and unfortunate encounters resulted in the deaths of nine Māori. Unable to secure any of the supplies he needed after weeks at sea, Cook named the area Poverty Bay and sailed south. Cook's journal entries reflect regret over these encounters, as he had failed his instructions to avoid hostilities with any indigenous people he encountered.

Attempts to build a monument to Cook's landing in New Zealand came to fruition in the late 19th century. Leonard Williams first proposed a monument on the site in 1888. A committee with the goal of establishing a memorial was set up in 1902, which launched a fundraising drive with the aim of all New Zealand school children donating one penny. This appeal raised £230, which added to a £500 grant from the New Zealand government and further support from the local Patriotic Fund Committee. The original monument was unveiled by Sir James Carroll on the anniversary of Cook's landing in 1906, to some initial controversy owing to the focus the monument placed on local military and not on Cook.

Reclamation as part of Gisborne's port meant that, by 1959, the monument was some 75 metres (246 ft) from the actual shoreline. Concerns were raised that the ongoing reclamation was damaging the integrity of the site, with the local chapter of the New Zealand Historic Places Trust petitioning the city council for a reserve to be established around the monument and a section of shoreline. This culminated in the first establishment of a reserve in 1966, with 1.1375 acres (0.4603 ha) being set aside around the monument. The reserve was expanded to include protected line of sight to the ocean in 1974, and in 1990 became the first National Historic Reserve on mainland New Zealand. In the same year, the Cook Monument was registered as a Category I heritage item by the New Zealand Historic Places Trust (since renamed Heritage New Zealand), designating it as a site with "special or outstanding historical or cultural heritage significance or value."

In 2019, the reserve received a significant upgrade to commemorate the 250th anniversary of Cook's expedition to New Zealand, following a grant from the Provincial Growth Fund. This included the addition of the Ikaroa sculpture in honour of Māia and his whare wananga, nine pou in honour of the nine Māori killed upon Cook's initial landing, and steel tukutuku panels made by a local iwi, Ngāti Oneone, which traces its ancestry to these waka. A distinct sculpture honours Te Maro, a significant ancestor of Ngāti Oneone who was killed during the initial encounter with Cook. Following the upgrades to the reserve, the British High Commissioner to New Zealand expressed the United Kingdom's regret for Te Maro's death during a ceremony at the site. The 2019 upgrades also saw the reserve renamed with the current dual name of Puhi Kai Iti / Cook Landing National Historic Reserve, to further recognise the dual exploration traditions honoured at the site.
