= Mainland islands =

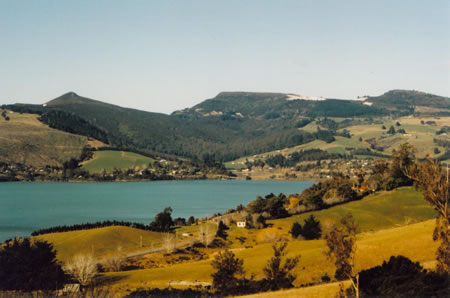
Orokonui Ecosanctuary, a mainland island

Mainland islands are areas on the North Island and South Island of New Zealand, set aside as reserves for endemic and native species, in a similar way to island reserves. Some mainland islands are managed by the Department of Conservation, while others are run by private trusts in collaboration with universities and local communities.

The "islands" were established to replicate the success of pest eradication and the return of natural flora and fauna on New Zealand's off-shore island reserves, to protect species that aren't suited to offshore ecosystems.

The reserves are a relatively new, unique and controversial conservation strategy, involving "research-by-management". They combine features of zoos, wilderness areas, and real islands. Pest-free fencing and geographical features are used to isolate the ecosystems in the same way the ocean isolates islands. However, intensive management is often needed to prevent the continual invasion from pests and predators in surrounding areas.

University of Canterbury research, published in 2001, suggested mainland islands could provide some protection to protected species.

The Maungatautari Restoration Project was established in 2004 and was the largest mainland island in 2015.

== Government mainland islands ==
The Department of Conservation operates four mainland islands with vastly different ecoystems.

- Boundary Stream Mainland Island
- Paengaroa Mainland Island
- Rotoiti Mainland Island
- Trounson Kauri Park Mainland Island

== Private mainland islands ==
There are also several mainland islands run by non-government organisations.

- Bushy Park (New Zealand)
- Kaipupu Point Sounds Wildlife Sanctuary
- Maungatautari Restoration Project
- Orokonui Ecosanctuary
- Zealandia

== See also ==
- Protected areas of New Zealand
- List of islands of New Zealand
