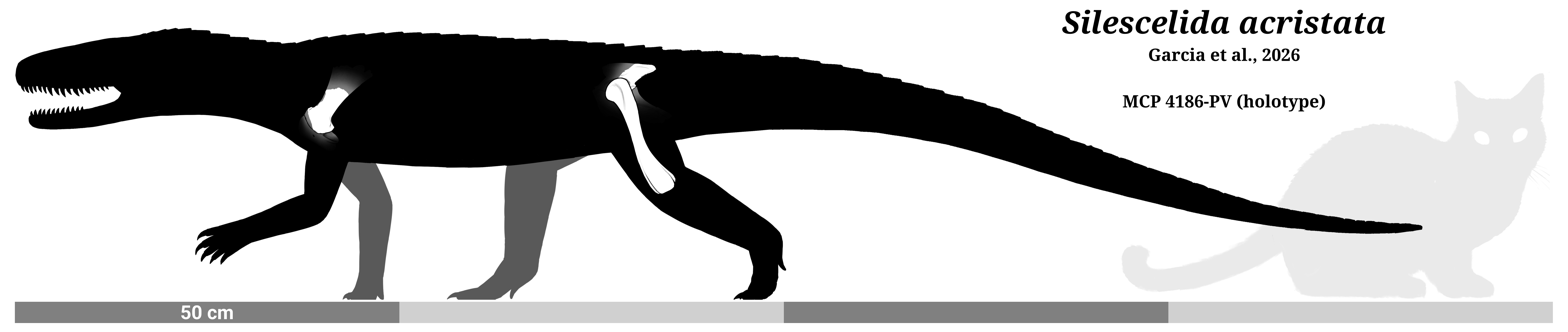
- Skeletal reconstruction showing known remains

Scientific classification
- Kingdom: Animalia
- Phylum: Chordata
- Class: Reptilia
- Clade: Archosauriformes
- Clade: Eucrocopoda
- Genus: †Silescelida; Garcia et al., 2026
- Species: †S. acristata

Binomial name
- †Silescelida acristata Garcia et al., 2026

= Silescelida =

Silescelida Temporal range: Middle Triassic, Ladinian

Genus of extinct archosauriform

Silescelida is an extinct genus of eucrocopodan archosauriform known from the Middle Triassic (Ladinian age) Santa Maria Supersequence of Brazil. The genus contains a single species, Silescelida acristata, known from a fragmentary skeleton. Phylogenetic analyses suggest affinities of Silescelida with the Euparkeriidae, which is otherwise unknown from South America.

== Discovery and naming ==
S. acristata type locality in Rio Grande do Sul, Brazil

The Silescelida fossil material was discovered in the Posto site of the Pinheiros-Chiniquá Sequence of the Santa Maria Supersequence (Paraná Basin). These outcrops are located within Quarta Colônia State Park in Dona Francisca municipality of Rio Grande do Sul, Brazil, and are assigned to the Dinodontosaurus Assemblage Zone. The specimen is housed in the Museum of Science and Technology at the Pontifical Catholic University of Rio Grande do Sul (PUCRS), where it is permanently accessioned as specimen MCP 4186-PV. It consists of a left scapula, right ilium, and left femur, found in association. Based on their comparable size, they likely all came from the same individual. At some point following its discovery, the proximal end of the femur, on which the collection code for the specimen had been inscribed, was lost. As a result, the data associated with its provenance was inaccessible until it was rediscovered in 2022, more than 20 years later.

In 2026, Maurício S. Garcia and colleagues described Silescelida acristata as a new genus and species of early-diverging eucrocopodan archosauriform based on these fossil remains, establishing MCP 4186-PV as the holotype specimen. The generic name, Silescelida, combines the Latin word siles, meaning 'silence' with the Greek word skelēs, meaning 'hind leg', alluding to the loss of that part of the holotype and its long-unknown provenance. The specific name, acristata, combines the Latin prefix a-, meaning 'without', with the Latin cristāta, meaning 'crested'. This references the distinctive lack of a protuberance on the femur for the attachment of the caudofemoralis muscle.

== Classification ==
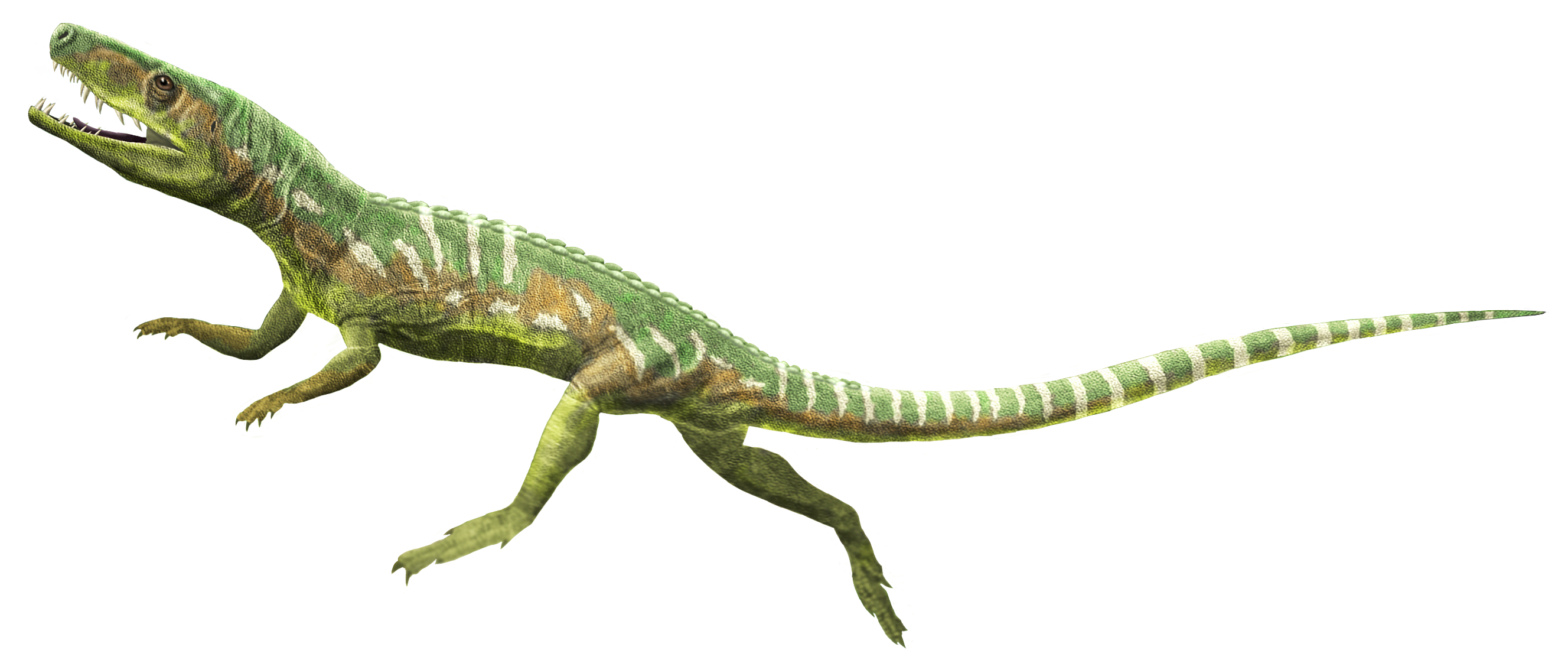
Life restoration of the similar Euparkeria

To test the affinities and relationships of Silescelida, Garcia et al. (2026) included it in an updated version of the phylogenetic matrix of Sengupta et al. (2024). The resolution of their results varied based on which taxa were included, with some versions producing large, unresolved polytomies. Their best-resolved results, which restricted character scorings to the holotype of the Polish Osmolskina (rather than including additional referred material) and combined the Chinese Halazhaisuchus with "Turfanosuchus" shageduensis as a single operational taxonomic unit (OTU), are displayed in the cladogram below. Silescelida was recovered in a clade including the Halazhaisuchus and the German Marcianosuchus, which all exhibit anatomical traits comparable to the South African Euparkeria, which was recovered in the next-diverging clade alongside the Chinese Wangisuchus tzeyii, together forming the family Euparkeriidae. This would make Silescelida the first early-diverging eucrocopodan found in the Triassic of Brazil, all other archosauromorphs from this region falling into the more derived clade comprising Proterochampsia and Archosauria. It is also the first euparkeriid-like taxon found in South America.

- - †Tasmaniosaurus triassicus
  - - †Osmolskina czatkowicensis
    - NMQR 3570
  - Archosauriformes
    - †Proterosuchidae
    - - †Erythrosuchidae
      - Eucrocopoda
        - †Cuyosuchus huenei
        - - †Asperoris mnyama
          - †Dorosuchus neoetus
          - - - †Halazhaisuchus qiaoensis
                + †"Turfanosuchus" shageduensis
              - †Marcianosuchus angustifrons
              - †Silescelida acristata
            - - †Euparkeriidae
                - †Euparkeria capensis
                - †Wangisuchus tzeyii
              - - †Proterochampsia
                - Archosauria
                  - Avemetatarsalia
                  - Pseudosuchia
