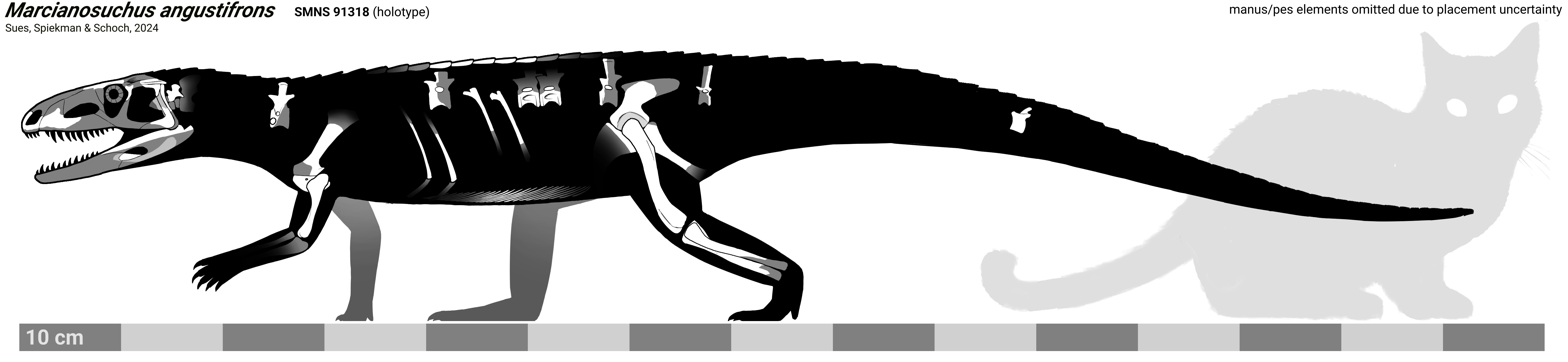

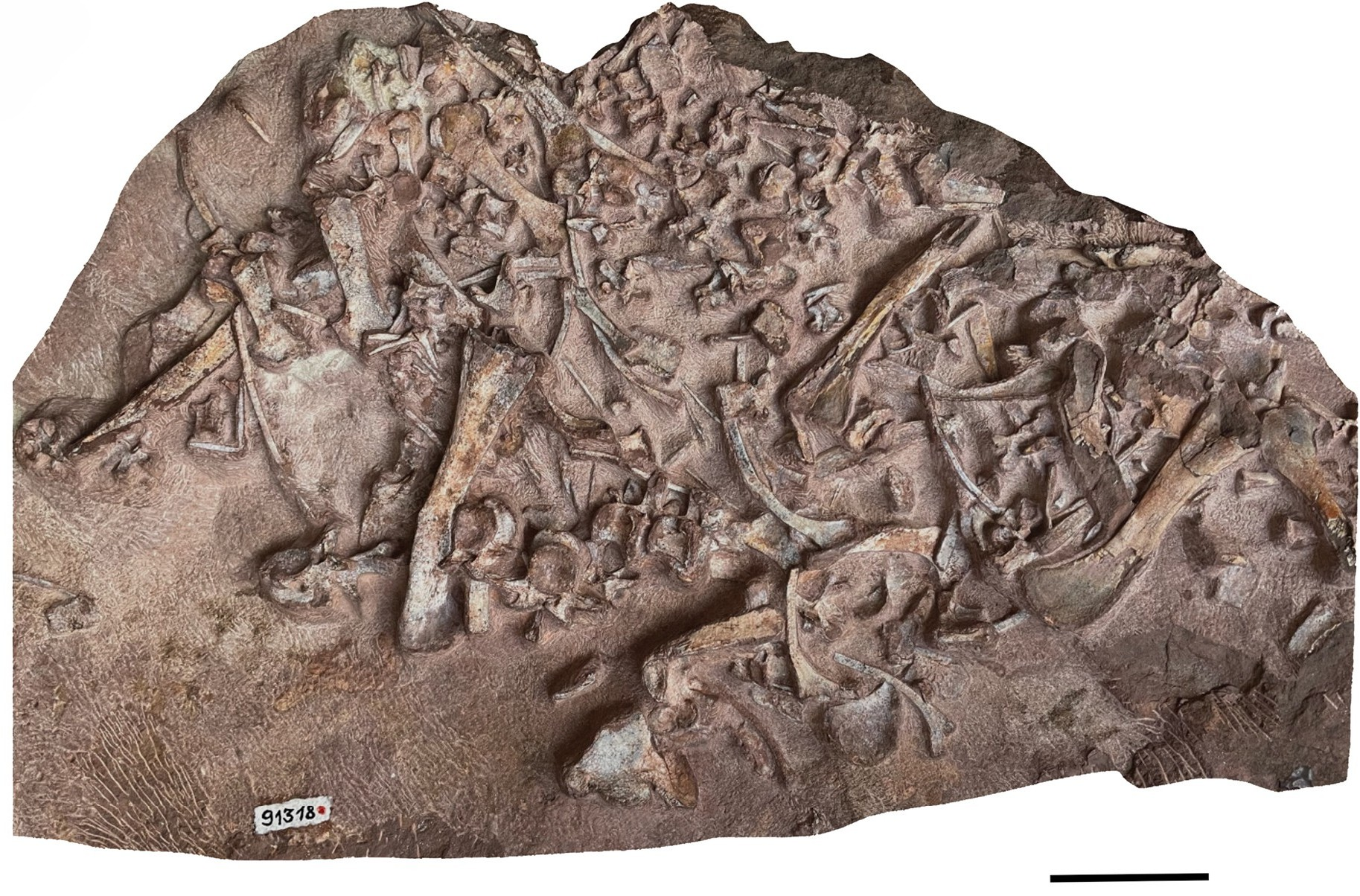
- Skeletal reconstruction (top) and picture of the holotype specimen as preserved (bottom)

Scientific classification
- Kingdom: Animalia
- Phylum: Chordata
- Class: Reptilia
- Clade: Eucrocopoda
- Genus: †Marcianosuchus; Sues et al., 2024
- Species: †M. angustifrons

Binomial name
- †Marcianosuchus angustifrons Sues et al., 2024

= Marcianosuchus =

Marcianosuchus Temporal range: Middle Triassic, Anisian (Aegean substage)

Genus of extinct archosauriform

Marcianosuchus is an extinct genus of eucrocopodan archosauriform known from the Middle Triassic (Anisian age) Plattensandstein Formation of Germany. The genus contains a single species, Marcianosuchus angustifrons, known from a partial disarticulated skeleton. Marcianosuchus represents the first non-archosaurian archosauriform named from Central Europe.

== Discovery and naming ==
M. angustifrons type locality at the Kössig quarry in Germany

The Marcianosuchus holotype specimen, SMNS 91318, was discovered in 1972 by Rupert Wild in talus deposits of the retired Kössig quarry, representing outcrops of the Plattensandstein Formation (Note: Sues et al. (2024) described Marcianosuchus as deriving from the Röt Formation, although Sues & Schoch (2025) instead assign it to the Plattensandstein Formation in a review of Triassic German reptiles.) (Buntsandstein Group) near Ebhausen in Calw district of Baden-Württemberg, Germany. The specimen consists of an associated, generally disarticulated, skeleton of a single individual. Known material includes several bones of the skull and lower jaws, teeth, pectoral and pelvic girdles, humeri, femora, an incomplete tibia and probable fibula, assorted autopodial bones, cervical, dorsal, and caudal vertebrae, associated osteoderms, ribs, and gastralia.

In 2024, Sues, Spiekman & Schoch described Marcianosuchus angustifrons as a new genus and species of archosauriforms based on these fossil remains. The generic name, Marcianosuchus, combines a reference to the Black Forest near the type locality (its Latin name, used by historian Ammianus Marcellinus in the 4th century, is "Marciana silva", meaning "border forest") with the Greek σοῦχος ("suchus"), after Sobek, the crocodile-headed ancient Egyptian deity. The specific name, angustifrons, combines the Latin words "angustus", meaning "narrow", and "frons", meaning "forehead", after the holotype skull's narrow frontal region.

Marcianosuchus is the only non-archosaurian archosauriform currently known from Germany's Buntsandstein Group and Central Europe as a whole.

== Description ==
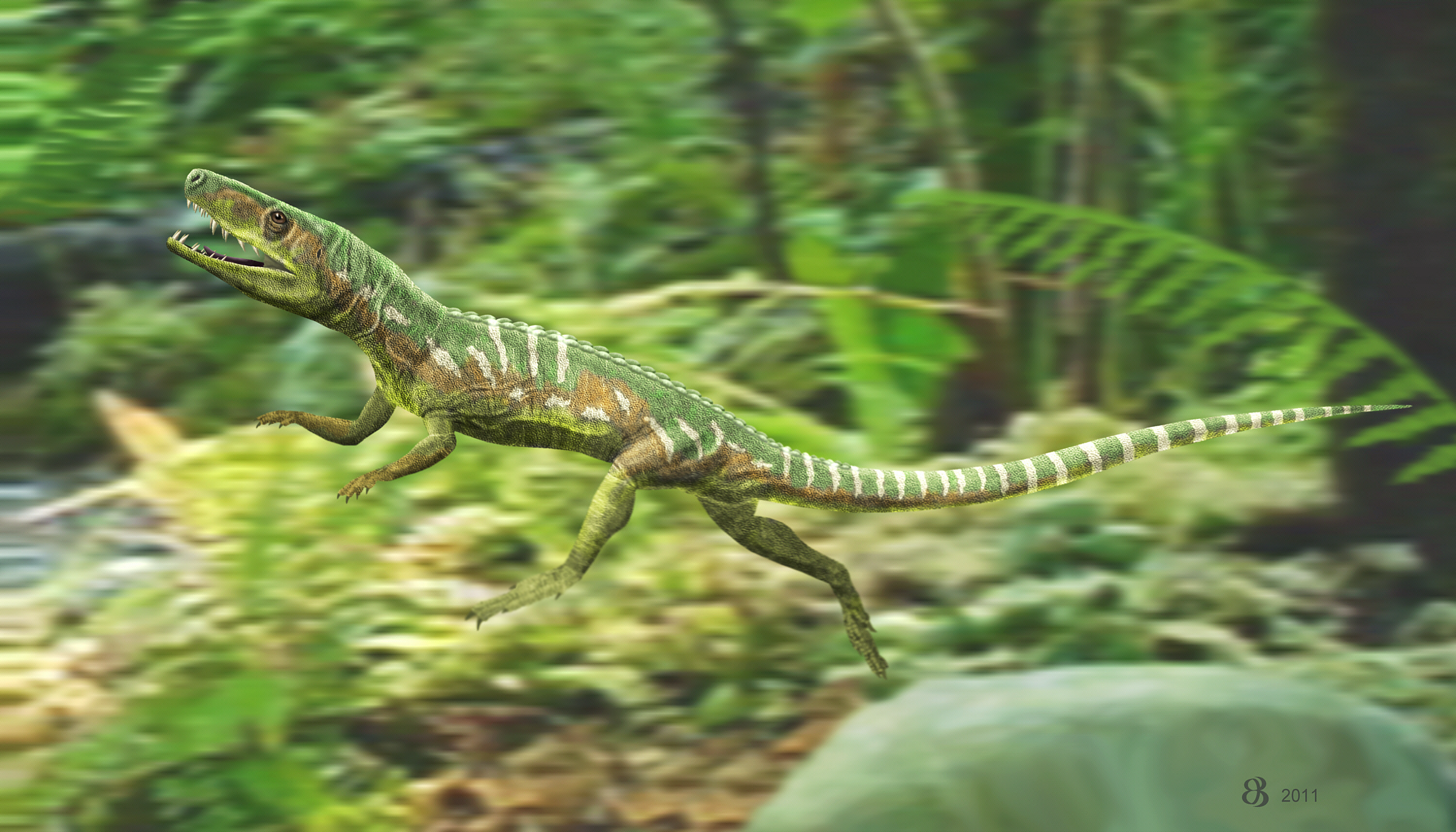
Life restoration of the similar Euparkeria

Marcianosuchus was a fairly small archosauriform. The holotype individual was likely not fully mature when it died, so would have been able to grow larger. Its femur was close to 115 millimetres (4.5 in), similar to the 127 millimetres (5.0 in) femur of the euparkeriid "Turfanosuchus" shageduensis. The longest known femur of Euparkeria is only 65.5 millimetres (2.58 in) long.

Marcianosuchus has a body plan very similar to the similarly aged Euparkeria from South Africa. With the euparkeriid-like Dorosuchus from Russia, Marcianosuchus presents a generally skeletal morphology comparable to the archosaur plesiomorphic condition.

Several generally rectangular osteoderms were found in association with the other skeletal elements of Marcianosuchus. These were interpreted as likely forming a paired row along the midline of the back, as in euparkeriids.

== Classification ==
In their phylogenetic analysis using the dataset of Sookias (2016), Sues et al. (2024) recovered Marcianosuchus as a basal member of the archosauriform clade Eucrocopoda, in an unresolved polytomy with Dorosuchus, Euparkeriidae, Phytosauria, and Archosauria. Their results are displayed in the cladogram below:

- Eucrocopoda
  - - †Vancleavea
    - - †Koilamasuchus
      - - †Archeopelta
        - - †Doswellia
          - †Jaxtasuchus
  - - - †Proterochampsa
      - - †Chanaresuchus
        - †Tropidosuchus
    - - †Dorosuchus
      - †Marcianosuchus
      - †Euparkeriidae
        - †Euparkeria
        - - †"Turfanosuchus" shageduensis
          - †Halazhaisuchus
          - †Osmolskina
      - †Phytosauria
      - Archosauria
        - Pseudosuchia
        - Avemetatarsalia

In their 2026 description of the Brazilian Silescelida, Garcia and colleagues included Marcianosuchus in their phylogenetic analyses, recovering it closely related to Silescelida and the Chinese Halazhaisuchus in their better-resolved trees. Depending on the taxon sampling in their analyses, Euparkeriidae was placed as either the previous- or subsequent-diverging clade. One of these tress is shown below:

- - †Tasmaniosaurus triassicus
  - - †Osmolskina czatkowicensis
    - NMQR 3570
  - Archosauriformes
    - †Proterosuchidae
    - - †Erythrosuchidae
      - Eucrocopoda
        - †Cuyosuchus huenei
        - - †Asperoris mnyama
          - †Dorosuchus neoetus
          - - - †Halazhaisuchus qiaoensis
                + †"Turfanosuchus" shageduensis
              - †Marcianosuchus angustifrons
              - †Silescelida acristata
            - - †Euparkeriidae
                - †Euparkeria capensis
                - †Wangisuchus tzeyii
              - - †Proterochampsia
                - Archosauria
                  - Avemetatarsalia
                  - Pseudosuchia

== Palaeoenvironment ==
Marcianosuchus is known from the Plattensandstein Formation of Germany, which dates to the Anisian age of the beginning of the mid-Triassic period. Other reptile fossils from the formation include those of Sclerosaurus (a procolophonid), Amotosaurus (a tanystropheid), undescribed juvenile rhynchosaurians, and the indeterminate, dubiuous diapsids Seemannia and Crenelosaurus.
