= Vigilosaurus =

Vigilosaurus Temporal range: Late Permian (Changhsingian), 252.2 Ma

Scientific classification
- Kingdom: Animalia
- Phylum: Chordata
- Class: Reptilia
- Clade: Diapsida
- Clade: Neodiapsida
- Genus: †Vigilosaurus; Chen & Liu, 2023
- Species: †V. gaochangensis

Binomial name
- †Vigilosaurus gaochangensis Chen & Liu, 2023

Extinct genus of reptiles

Vigilosaurus is an extinct genus of reptiles from the Permian-aged Guodikeng Formation of Xinjiang, China. The genus contains a single species, Vigilosaurus gaochangensis, known from a partial left hindlimb.

== Classification ==
When it was described in 2023, the Vigilosaurus holotype was identified as a possible member of the archosauriform clade Proterochampsia. This would make Vigilosaurus one of the oldest known archosauromorphs, indicating they had diversified much more rapidly than previously thought. However, a 2025 publication revisited the specimen, recovering it outside of the Archosauromorpha altogether. Instead, it was identified as outside of the reptile crown group (Sauria), diverging after the South African genus Youngina. These contrasting results are displayed in the cladograms below:

Topology 1: Results of Chen & Liu (2023)

- Archosauriformes
  - Proterosuchidae
  - - Antarctanax
    - - Sarmatosuchus
      - - Cuyosuchus
        - - Erythrosuchidae
          - - Dorosuchus
            - Asperoris
            - - Euparkeria
              - - Halazhaisuchus
                - - Avemetatarsalia
                  - Proterochampsia
                    - - Polymorphodon
                      - - Vigilosaurus
                        - Litorosuchus
                        - Vancleavea
                    - - Other proterochampsians

Topology 2: Results of Ezcurra, Sues & Fröbisch (2025)

- - Orovenator
  - - Claudiosaurus
    - - - Acerosodontosaurus
        - Hovasaurus
      - - Youngina
        - - Vigilosaurus
          - - Choristodera
            - Sauria
              - Lepidosauromorpha
              - - Manistropheus
                - - - Aenigmastropheus
                    - Protorosaurus
                  - - Jesairosaurus + Tanysauria
                    - Crocopoda ⇒ Archosauriformes
