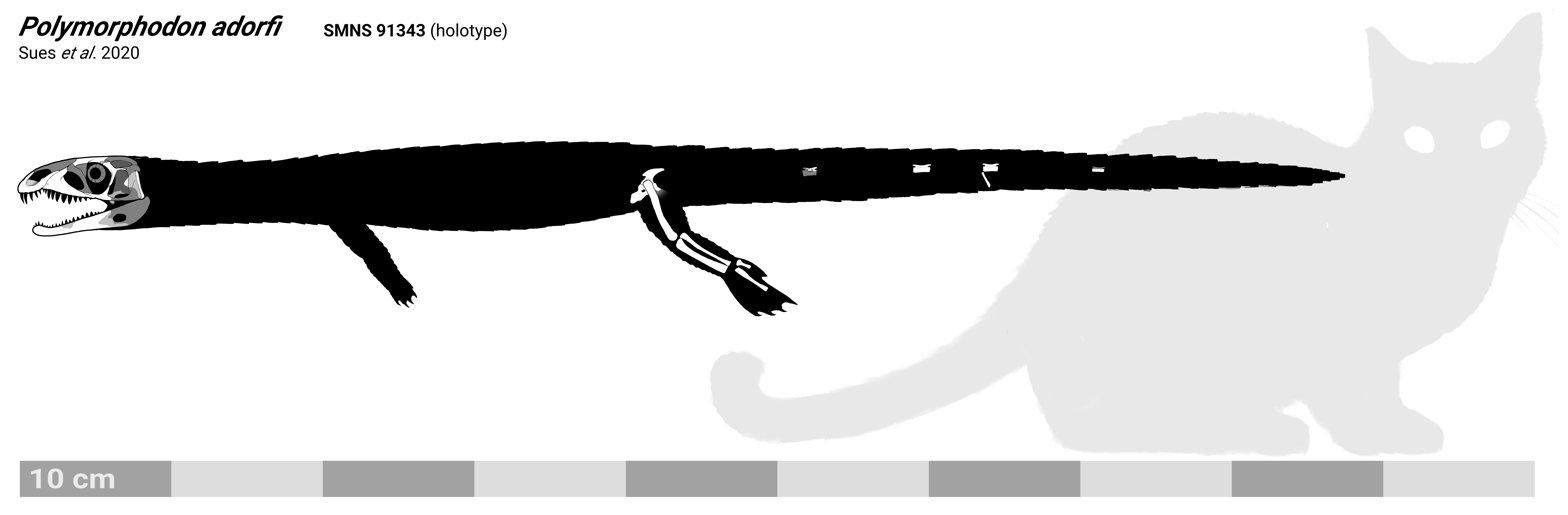
- Skeletal reconstruction and size comparison of the known remains

Scientific classification
- Kingdom: Animalia
- Phylum: Chordata
- Class: Reptilia
- Clade: Archosauriformes
- Clade: Eucrocopoda
- Genus: Polymorphodon; Sues et al., 2020

Type species
- †Polymorphodon adorfi Sues et al., 2020

= Polymorphodon =

Polymorphodon Temporal range: Middle Triassic, Ladinian

Extinct genus of reptiles

Polymorphodon is an extinct genus of doswelliid archosauriform reptile from the Middle Triassic of Germany. The only known species is Polymorphodon adorfi, discovered in Lower Keuper (Erfurt Formation) deposits at a quarry in Eschenau, Germany. Polymorphodon is notable for its heterodont dentition, with long, conical premaxillary teeth followed by thin maxillary teeth with large serrations. Maxillary teeth near the back of the mouth are short and leaf-shaped, similar to those of some living and extinct reptiles with a herbivorous or omnivorous diet. This may suggest that Polymorphodon's diet included some plants, a rarity among basal archosauriforms, most of which are carnivores.

== Discovery ==
Polymorphodon is named from a holotype specimen, SMNS 91343. This specimen is a disarticulated collection of bones from a single skeleton, including parts of the skull, a partial braincase, palatal fragments, sections of the lower jaws, bones of the hip and hindlimb, tail vertebrae, and potential hand bone fragments. Another specimen, SMNS 91400, consists of skull fragments. Although unique features can be recognized, many of the bones are distorted by crushing and pyrite disease.

The Polymorphodon specimens were found in 2010 at the Schumann limestone quarry on the outskirts of Eschenau, a village within Vellberg, Germany. The Eschenau quarry is one of the most fossiliferous sites preserving the Ladinian-age Lower Keuper sequence, also known as the Erfurt Formation. The specimens were specifically recovered from E6c-d, thin lake mudstone beds near the top of the Untere Graue Mergel ("Lower Grey Marl") subunit of the Lower Keuper.

The unusual heterodont dentition of Polymorphodon is the basis for its generic name, which is derived from Greek terms for "many shapes of teeth". The specific name honors Norbert Adorf, a fossil preparator whose work has been invaluable to the study of the local Triassic fauna.

== Description ==
=== Skull ===
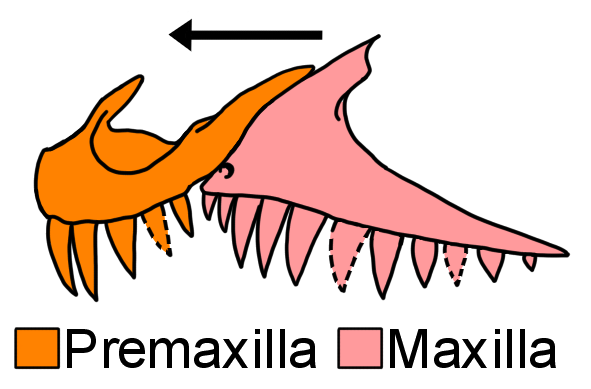
Diagram of toothed snout bones

Although incomplete, the skull has been reconstructed as fairly short and deep, about 6.0 centimeters (2.4 inches) in length. The premaxilla is one of the most characteristic bones in the skull. Each premaxilla has five teeth, more than euparkeriids, which have four. The teeth were smooth and conical, lacking serrations. The first three teeth were very long, with the second tooth being the longest. The largest component of the premaxilla is the posterodorsal process, a leaf-shaped prong of bone which extends behind the nares (nostrils). Euparkeriids have a much smaller and more vertically-oriented posterodorsal process. Below the nares is a deep excavation known as a narial fossa. The maxilla is fairly typical in shape, with a short anterior process (front branch), a slanted dorsal process (upper branch), a long posterior process (rear branch), and an antorbital fenestra defined between the dorsal and posterior processes. The anterior process has a notch at its front tip followed by a pit, as with a few other archosauromorphs. The dorsal and posterior processes both taper rearwards like other early archosauriforms, and there may be a subtle antorbital fossa (depressed area) in front of the antorbital fenestra. The inner surface of the maxilla has an arched ledge overlooking broad interdental plates. The 11 maxillary teeth had thecodont implantation and were more flattened in cross-section than the premaxillary teeth. The maxillary teeth were largest about 40% down the bone. Towards the rear of the maxilla, the tooth shape changes from long and recurved to short and leaf-shaped. Unlike the premaxillary teeth, there were large hook-shaped serrations set at an angle on each maxillary tooth. The serrations decrease in size towards the crown and extend closer to the root on the front edge of each tooth. The serrations (and the overall shape of teeth in the rear part of the maxilla) resembled those of herbivorous or omnivorous reptiles such as iguanid lizards, basal sauropodomorph dinosaurs, and Protecovasaurus.

The presence of a Y-shaped postorbital indicates that Polymorphodon had a diapsid skull. The postorbital had a blunt inner branch and curved rear and lower branches. The frontal would have formed the upper edge of the orbit (eye socket), but it is poorly preserved. The long front branch of the slender jugal forms most of the lower edge of the orbit. The shorter rear branch of the jugal would have formed part of the lower edge of the infratemporal fenestra. The quadrate is straight, has a triangular pterygoid flange on its front edge, and generally resembles that of Euparkeria. The pterygoid is slender, and it is unknown whether there were teeth on its lower surface. Vomer fragments are also preserved. The braincase was fairly typical by archosauriform standards, with a large foramen magnum surrounded by a variety of occipital bones. The foramen magnum is edged by exoccipitals which expand downwards but are separated by a basioccipital at the lower edge of the hole. This contrasts with Erythrosuchidae (which have exoccipitals that meet at the bottom) but is similar to euparkeriids and Doswellia. Also like Euparkeria, there is a deep and narrow metotic foramen (an area including the jugular foramen and inner ear) on the side of the braincase. However, the parabasisphenoid is horizontally-oriented, similar to archosauriforms more basal than euparkeriids. Nevertheless, the basitubera of the parabasisphenoid are separated from each other, like derived archosauriforms. The lower jaw is represented by a low dentaries with parallel upper and lower edges. Preserved dentary teeth are variable in shape and serrated similarly to maxillary teeth.

=== Postcrania ===
There are several preserved vertebrae, most of them caudals (tail vertebrae) which are concave at both ends. Caudals closer to the base of the tail were shorter, while those near the tip of the tail were long, low, and simple. The vertebrae lack notochordal perforations and have neural spines fused to their centrum, indicating that the specimen was an adult. A few small and slender manus (hand) bones are preserved, indicating that the hand was small and had slightly curved claws. The hip and hindlimb were more complete. The iliac has a slightly convex upper edge, a long postacetabular process (rear blade), and a small but distinct preacetabular process (front blade). A tentatively-identified pubis has an expanded and leaf-shaped lower blade as well as an obturator foramen closer to its connection with the ischium. A bone which may be the ischium is straight and flat. The femur is slightly sigmoid, with indistinct condyles and a ridge-like fourth trochanter. It generally resembles that of Osmolskina, as do the slightly shorter tibia and fibula. Pes (foot) bones include a thick, hooked metatarsal V and a straight, slender metatarsal IV, both of which are typical for archosauriforms. Osteoderms are missing in the fossil, though they may have been present in life.

== Classification ==
Polymorphodon can be identified as an archosauriform thanks to several traits of the skull (antorbital fenestra, serrated teeth) and hip (long, convex iliac blade). The tapering posterior process of the maxilla and the presence of interdental plates suggest that it was a Euparkeria-grade archosauriform, more derived than Proterosuchidae or Erythrosuchidae. When placed into the parsimony phylogenetic analysis of Ezcurra (2016), Polymorphodon was found to be an unstable eucrocopodan in a polytomy with euparkeriids, Proterochampsia, archosaurs, and various other taxa. It was tentatively placed closer to archosaurs in a bayesian analysis of the dataset. A simplified strict consensus tree (average result) of the parsimony analysis is given below:

- Archosauriformes
  - Proterosuchidae
  - - Fugusuchus
    - - Sarmatosuchus
      - - Cuyosuchus
        - - Erythrosuchidae
          - Eucrocopoda
            - Dorosuchus
            - - Polymorphodon
              - Euparkeria
              - - Dongusuchus*
                - Yarasuchus*
              - Proterochampsia
              - Archosauria

*Note: Dongusuchus and Yarasuchus have more recently been found to be avemetatarsalian archosaurs in the group Aphanosauria.
