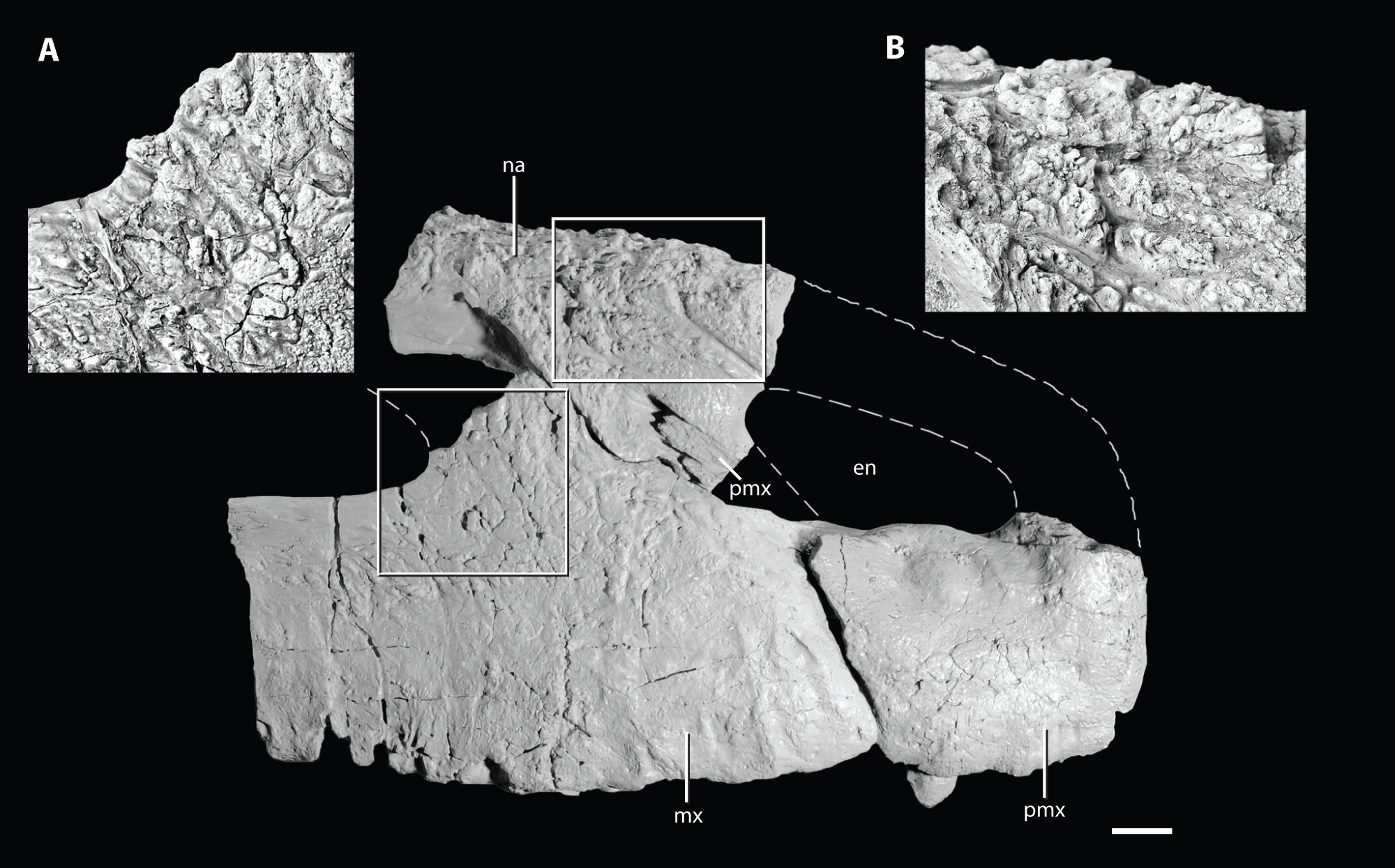
- Front part of the skull

Scientific classification
- Kingdom: Animalia
- Phylum: Chordata
- Class: Reptilia
- Clade: Crocopoda
- Clade: Archosauriformes
- Genus: †Asperoris; Nesbitt et al., 2013

Type species
- †Asperoris mnyama Nesbitt et al., 2013

= Asperoris =

Asperoris Temporal range: Middle Triassic, 245–242 Ma

Extinct genus of reptiles

Asperoris is an extinct genus of archosauriform reptile known from the Middle Triassic Manda Beds of southwestern Tanzania. It is the first archosauriform known from the Manda Beds that is not an archosaur. However, its relationships with other non-archosaurian archosauriforms are uncertain. It was first named by Sterling J. Nesbitt, Richard J. Butler and David J. Gower in 2013 and the type species is Asperoris mnyama. Asperoris means "rough face" in Latin, referring to the distinctive rough texture of its skull bones.

== Discovery ==
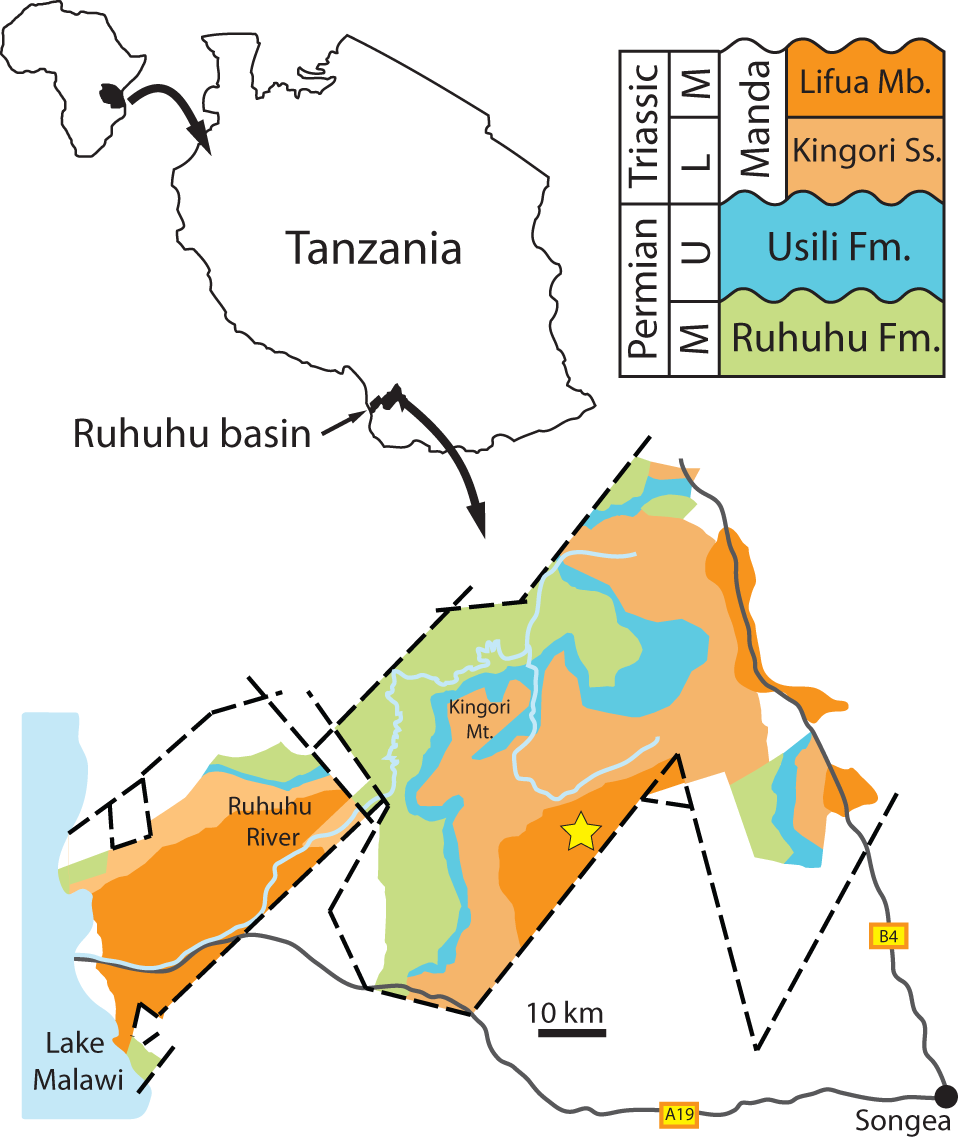
Location of the discovery

Asperoris is known solely from the well-preserved but incomplete holotype skull NHMUK PV R36615, which includes the right premaxilla and maxilla bones of the upper jaw, the right nasal, prefrontal, frontal, postfrontal, and parietal bones of the top of the skull, and part of the right postorbital bone behind the eye socket, as well as three unidentified skull fragments. NHMUK PV R36615 was discovered by a joint 1963 expedition of the Natural History Museum and the University of London to eastern Zambia and western Tanzania (then northern Rhodesia and Tanganyika, respectively). Asperoris comes from Manda Beds of the Ruhuhu Basin in Songea Urban District of southwestern Tanzania, which dates back to the late Anisian stage of the Middle Triassic. Based on field notes, NHMUK PV R36615 was found on August 23 in a drainage of the Hita River between the Njalila and Hiasi rivers also known as locality U9/1 of the Lifua Member of Manda Beds, near the remains of dicynodonts. It was fully described in 2013 and assigned to a new genus and species, Asperoris mnyama, by Sterling J. Nesbitt, Richard J. Butler and David J. Gower in the journal PLoS One. The generic name is derived from asper, meaning "rough", and oris, meaning "face" in Latin in reference to its rough and uniquely sculptured skull. The specific name mnyama means "beast" in Swahili.

== Description ==
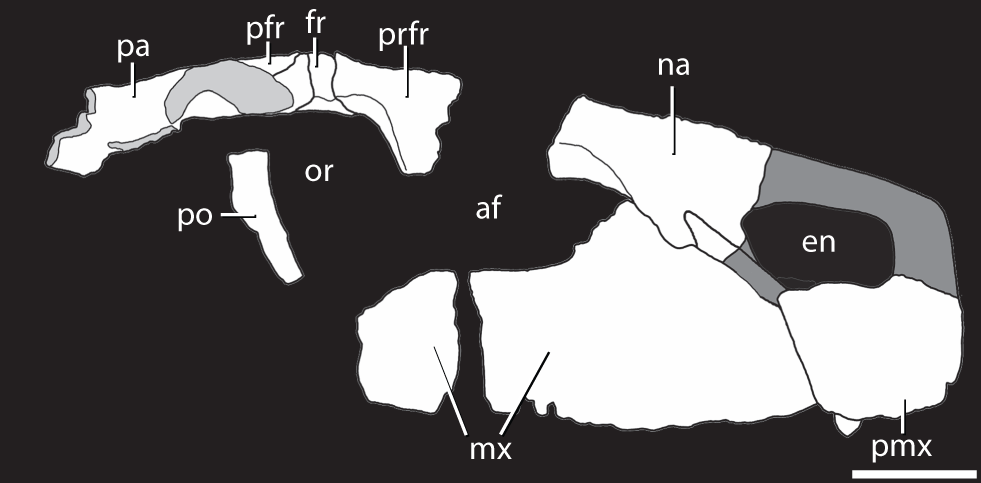
Reconstructed skull

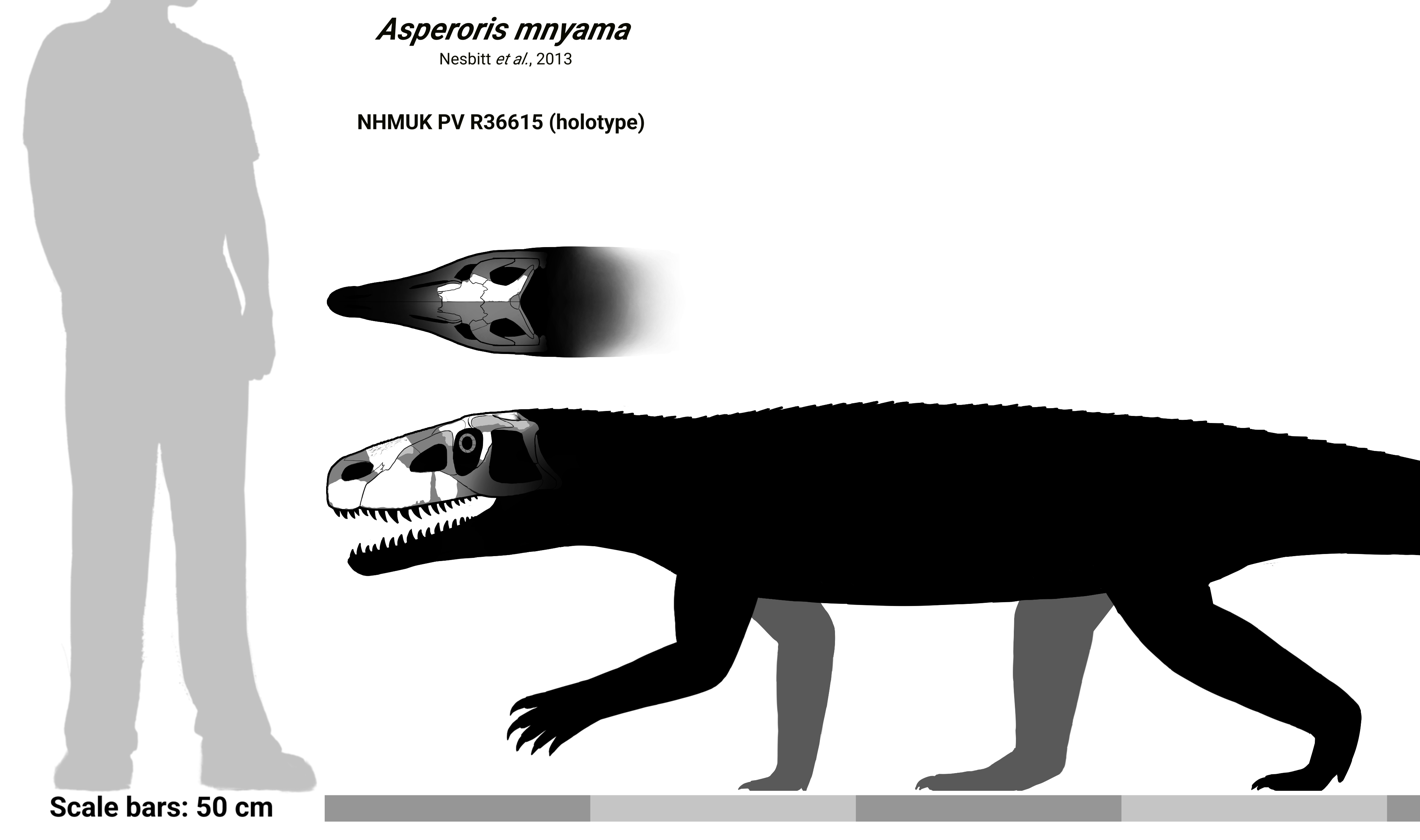
Hypothetical size comparison

Like most archosauriforms from the Manda Beds, Asperoris is known from very fragmentary remains. NHMUK PV R36615 is distinguished from some other archosauriform material in the beds by the lack of a depression called an antorbital fossa on the surfaces of its maxilla and premaxilla. Although it can not be directly compared with Stagonosuchus, Hypselorhachis, Nyasasaurus, Teleocrater and an unnamed suchian, its inferred phylogenetic position is not consistent with it belonging to any of these taxa. The total length of the skull is estimated to have been 50 centimetres (20 in) in length. A unique characteristic or autapomorphy of Asperoris is the rough texture of its skull bones, particularly the frontal. The skull roof of Asperoris is relatively thick compared to those of other archosauriforms and its antorbital fenestra, a hole in the side of the skull in front of the eye socket, is relatively narrow.

== Relationships ==
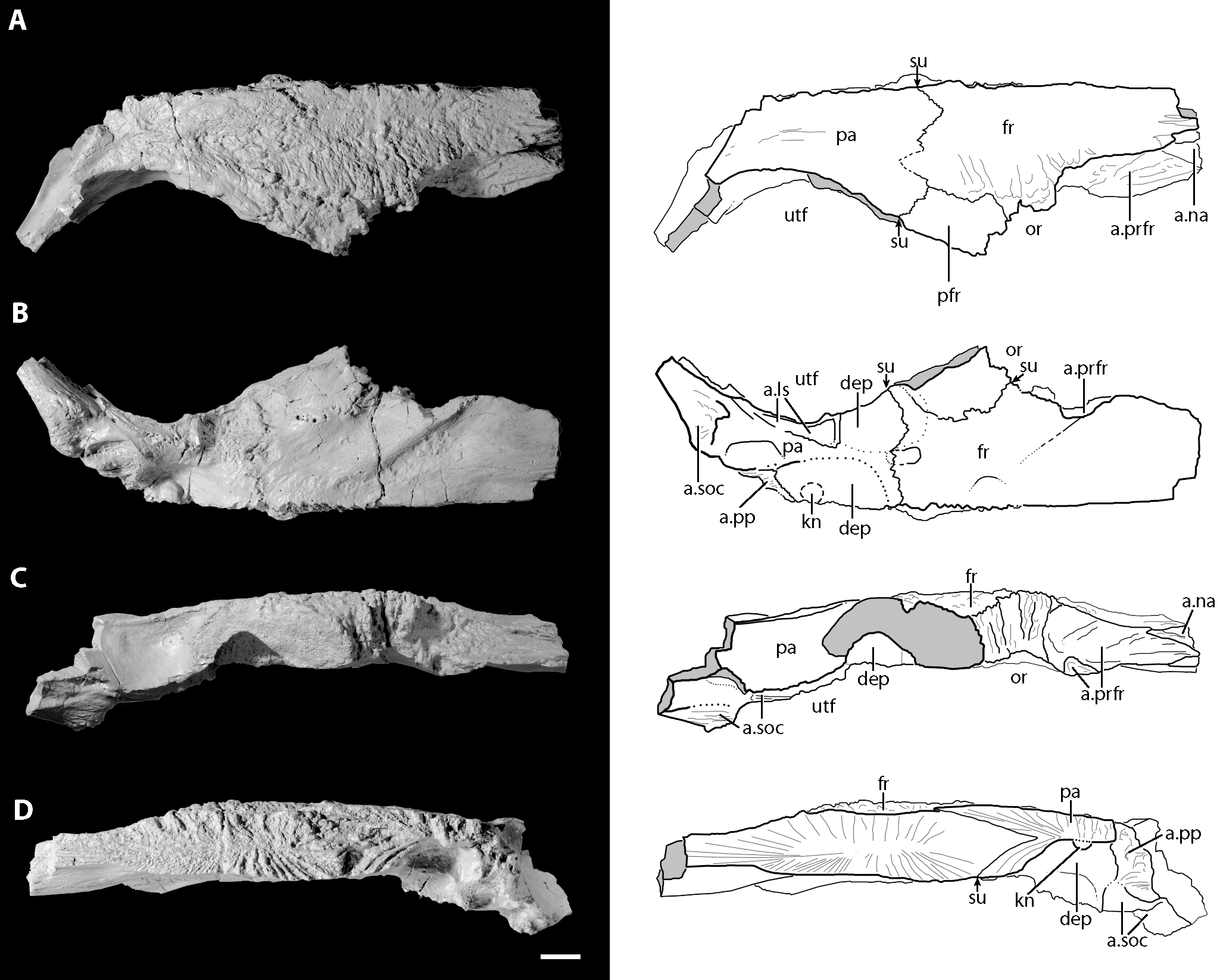
Skull roof

Asperoris belongs to a clade or evolutionary grouping of reptiles called Archosauriformes, which includes Archosauria (the clade including living crocodilians and birds) and their extinct, mostly Triassic, relatives. It has several features that place it outside Archosauria with non-archosaurian archosauriforms, including the lack of an antorbital fossa and the possible presence of a postparietal bone at the back of the skull, which is not found in archosaurs. However, it also has features that place it among the closest relatives of archosaurs, including the presence of an antorbital fenestra and the lack of a hole called the parietal foramen on the skull roof. Asperoris shares with a group of archosauriforms called erythrosuchids the presence of slot in the lower part of the nasal bone that fits into a projection of the premaxilla beneath it. It also has a thecodont dentition, meaning that its teeth fit into deep sockets in the jaw. A thecodont dentition is seen in all non-archosaurian archosauriforms except proterosuchids, and is characteristic of the clade.

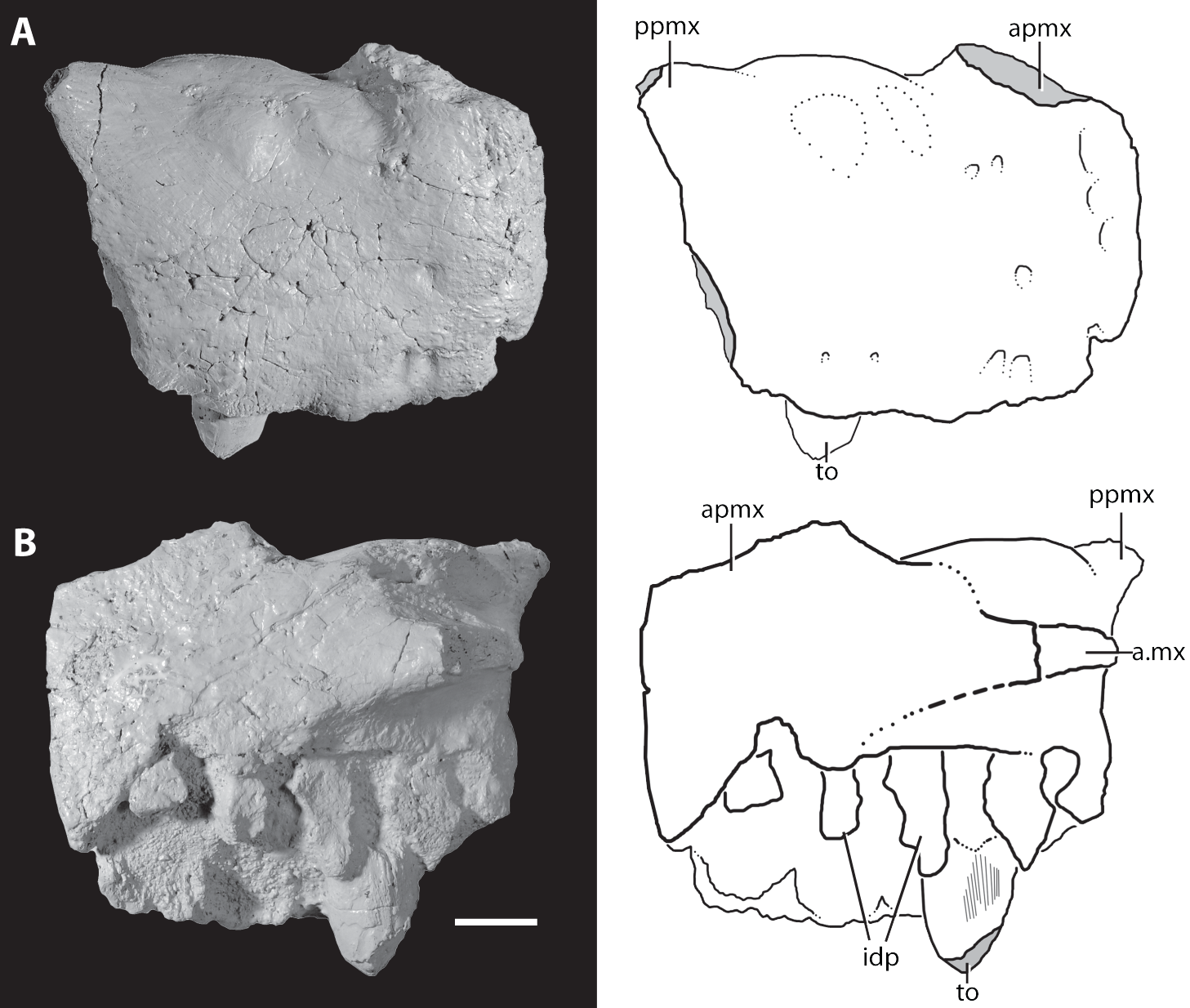
Premaxilla

Because of the poor preservation of NHMUK PV R36615 and the phylogenetic analysis used in the study (which focuses on relationships of Triassic archosaurs), the phylogenetic relationships of Asperoris are uncertain. Nesbitt, Butler and Gower's 2013 phylogenetic analysis resulted in a strict consensus tree with Asperoris in a polytomy or unresolved phylogenetic relationship with Erythrosuchus africanus, an erythrosuchid, Vancleavea campi, an aquatic archosauriform, the proterosuchid clade, and the clade including Euparkeria capensis, phytosaurs, and Archosauria. Other phylogenetic trees produced in the analysis placed Asperoris as the sister taxon (closest relative) of either Erythrosuchus africanus or Euparkeria capensis. A sister-taxon relationship with Erythrosuchus is more likely because it is based on a derived feature, the slot in the nasal, while the relationship with Euparkeria is less likely because it is based only on characteristics inherited from archosauriform ancestors (plesiomorphies).

Asperoris was also featured in a phylogenetic analysis by Martin Ezcurra in 2016. Most parts of Ezcurra's analysis omitted this genus due to its incompleteness, but in versions which did feature it, it was found in a polytomy with Yarasuchus, Dongusuchus, Dorosuchus, and Euparkeria at the base of a clade which also includes proterochampsians and archosaurs. Ezcurra named this broad clade Eucrocopoda. The five-genus polytomy is resolved into a clearer system of clades when Asperoris is omitted, as the taxon's lack of postcranial features reduced the analysis's clarity. Yarasuchus and Dongusuchus are now considered to be aphanosaurs, part of a group of archosaurs at the base of the branch that leads to pterosaurs and dinosaurs (including birds) but not crocodiles.
