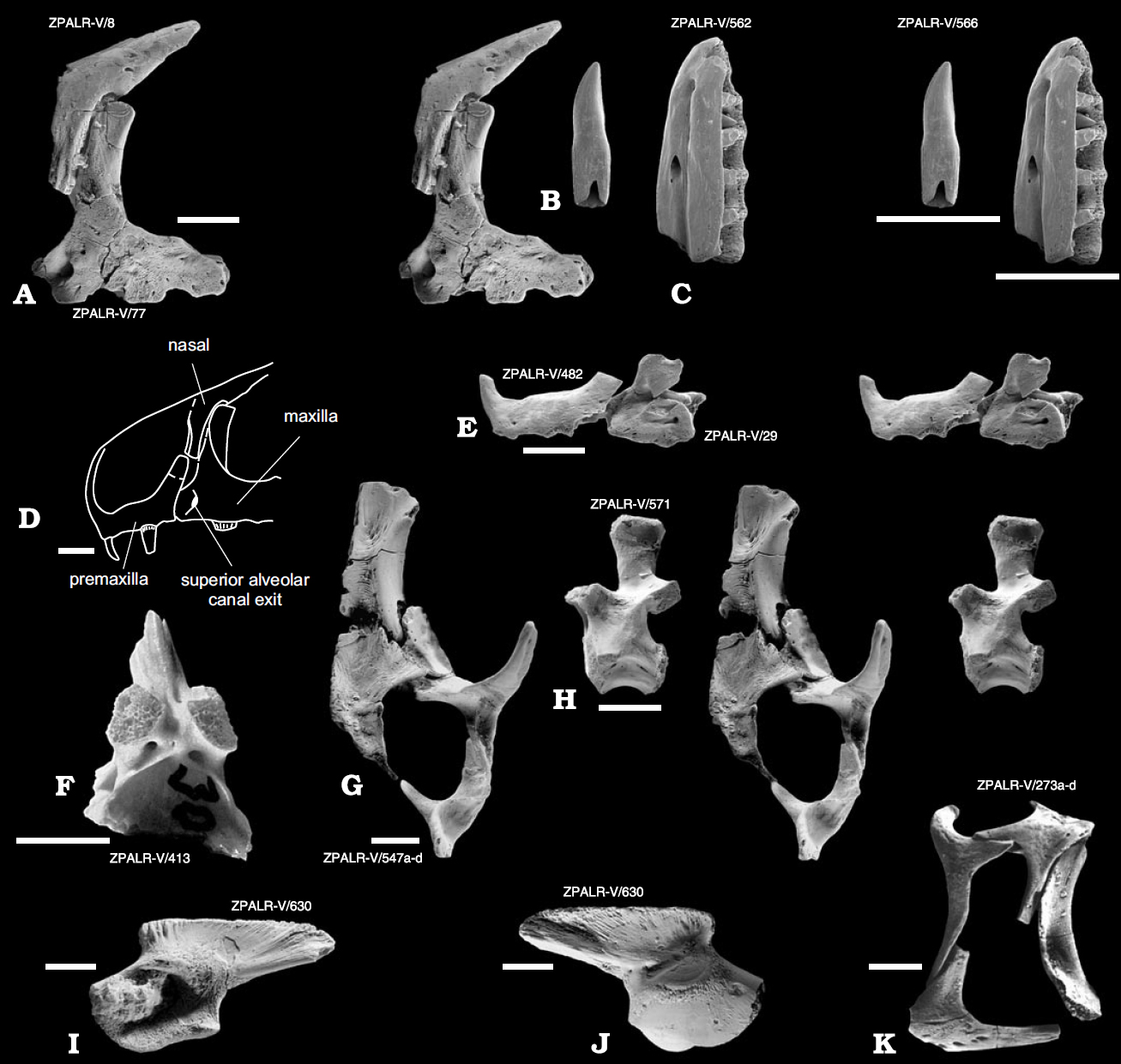
- Fossil elements

Scientific classification
- Kingdom: Animalia
- Phylum: Chordata
- Class: Reptilia
- Family: †Euparkeriidae
- Genus: †Osmolskina; Borsuk−Białynicka & Evans, 2003

Type species
- †Osmolskina czatkowicensis Borsuk−Białynicka & Evans, 2003

= Osmolskina =

Osmolskina Temporal range: Early Triassic

Extinct genus of reptiles

Osmolskina is a genus of archosauriform reptile which lived during the Early Triassic in what is now Poland. The type species, Osmolskina czatkowicensis, was described by Magdalena Borsuk−Białynicka and Susan Evans in 2003. The generic name honors the Polish paleontologist Halszka Osmólska.

== Resemblance to Euparkeria ==
Osmolskina closely resembles the well-known genus Euparkeria. The authors of the 2003 paper considered classifying Osmolskina within the family Euparkeriidae, noting the animal's close resemblance to Euparkeria, but concluded that "Euparkeriidae remains monotypic because no other genus can be assigned to it with confidence."
