= Dorosuchus =

Dorosuchus Temporal range: Middle Triassic

Scientific classification
- Kingdom: Animalia
- Phylum: Chordata
- Class: Reptilia
- Family: †Euparkeriidae (?)
- Genus: †Dorosuchus; Sennikov, 1989

Type species
- †Dorosuchus neoetus Sennikov, 1989

Extinct genus of reptiles

Dorosuchus is an extinct genus of archosauriform previously assigned to the family Euparkeriidae. It lived during the Anisian stage of the Middle Triassic. Fossil material is known from Sol-Iletsk in Orenburg Oblast, Russia. The type species is D. neoetus, named in 1989.

== Description ==
Dorosuchus was considered to be a relative of euparkeriid Euparkeria based on the features of the limbs and pelvic girdle. Most specimens are known from a single block of siltstone from a location known as the Berdyanka I locality by Berdyanka River. Limb and hip elements, sacral and caudal vertebrae, and a braincase are preserved in the block and represent four individuals. A partial ilium is known from another locality.

== Classification ==
Dorosuchus was initially classified as a euparkeriid in 1989 with its first description. The family Euparkeriidae is best represented by the genus Euparkeria from the Early Triassic of South Africa. Several other genera in the past have been assigned to the family, including Turfanosuchus, Halazhaisuchus, and Wangisuchus. However, most of these genera have been excluded from the family on the basis of anatomical features such as those found in the ankle (e.g. Turfanosuchus and Wangisuchus) or are known from specimens that are too poorly preserved to offer many features that could include them within the family (e.g. Halazbaisuchus and Wangisuchus). Doubts have also been raised about the assignment of Dorosuchus to the family Euparkeriidae because of a lack of defining characteristics. Nevertheless, a 2009 paper describing the anatomy of Osmolskina, the euparkeriid classification of Dorosuchus was reaffirmed. However, a 2016 review of Euparkeriidae recovered Dorosuchus in a polytomy with Euparkeriidae, Archosauria, and Phytosauria.
