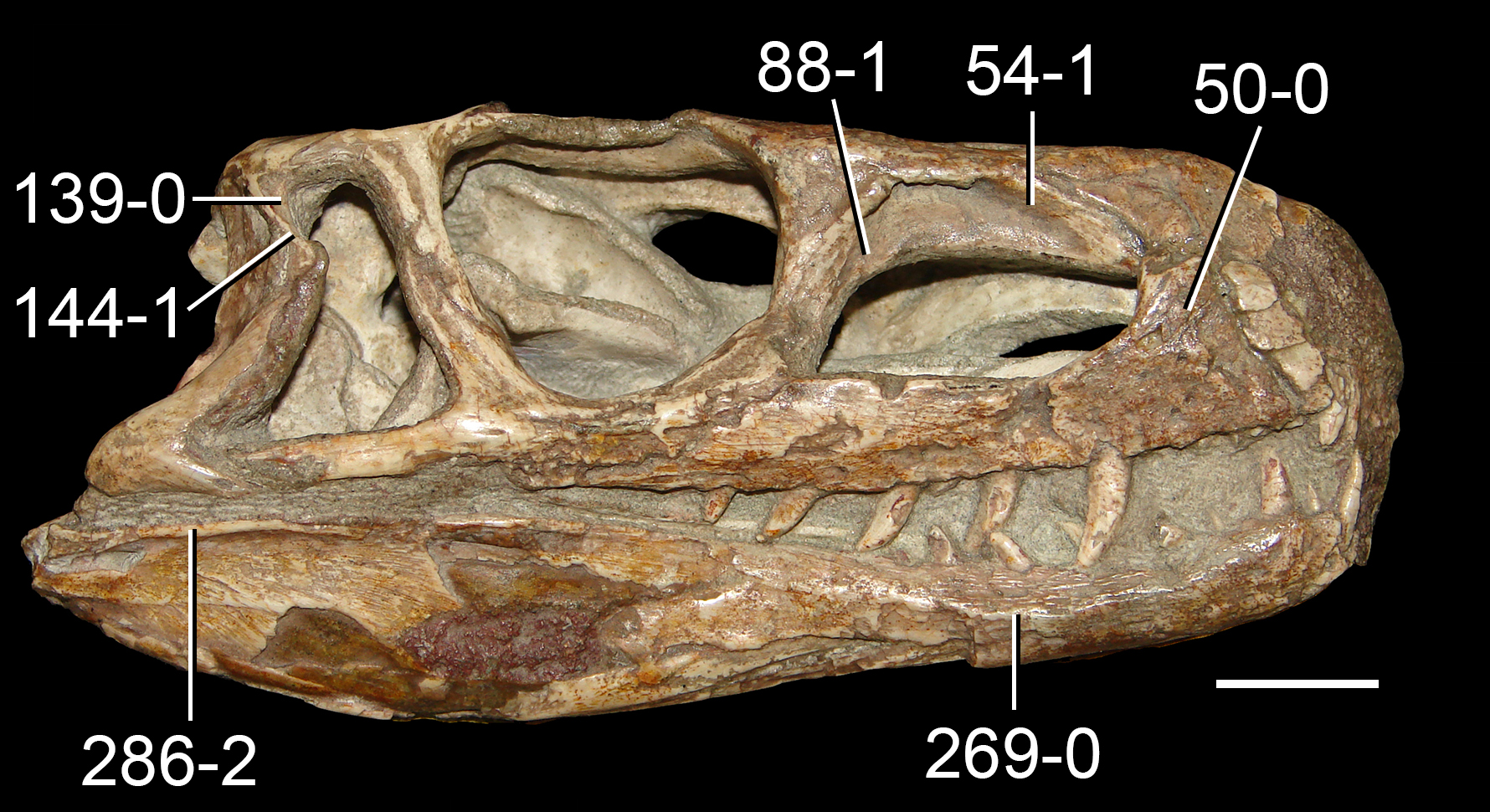
- The skull of Euparkeria capensis

Scientific classification
- Kingdom: Animalia
- Phylum: Chordata
- Class: Reptilia
- Clade: Eucrocopoda
- Family: †Euparkeriidae; Huene, 1920

Genera
- †Euparkeria; †Osmolskina; †Halazhaisuchus

= Euparkeriidae =

Euparkeriids Temporal range: Early Triassic - Late Triassic, 250–230 Ma

Extinct family of reptiles

Euparkeriidae is an extinct family of small carnivorous archosauriforms which lived from the Early Triassic to the Middle Triassic (Anisian). While most other early archosauriforms walked on four limbs, euparkeriids were probably facultative bipeds that had the ability to walk on their hind limbs at times. The most well known member of Euparkeriidae is the species Euparkeria capensis, which was named by paleontologist Robert Broom from the Karoo Basin of South Africa in 1913 and is known from several nearly complete skeletons. The family name was first proposed by German paleontologist Friedrich von Huene in 1920; Huene classified euparkeriids as members of Pseudosuchia, a traditional name for crocodilian-line archosaurs from the Triassic (Pseudosuchia means "false crocodiles"). However, phylogenetic analyses performed in the 21st century place Euparkeriidae as a group of Archosauriformes, a position outside Pseudosuchia and close to the ancestry of both crocodile-line archosaurs and bird-line archosaurs (which include dinosaurs and pterosaurs). However, they are probably not direct ancestors of archosaurs.

Several other species apart from Euparkeria have been assigned to the family, but many are dubious or have been determined to have been placed in the family incorrectly. One study has suggested that Euparkeriidae may not represent a true evolutionary grouping or clade. Instead, the family may represent an evolutionary grade of small archosauriforms (making it paraphyletic) or a group of species that each evolved small body sizes through evolutionary convergence (making it polyphyletic). However, other studies consider the family valid, albeit difficult to diagnose. Euparkeriidae is defined as the most inclusive clade containing Euparkeria capensis but not Crocodylus niloticus (the nile crocodile) or Passer domesticus (the house sparrow).

== Description ==
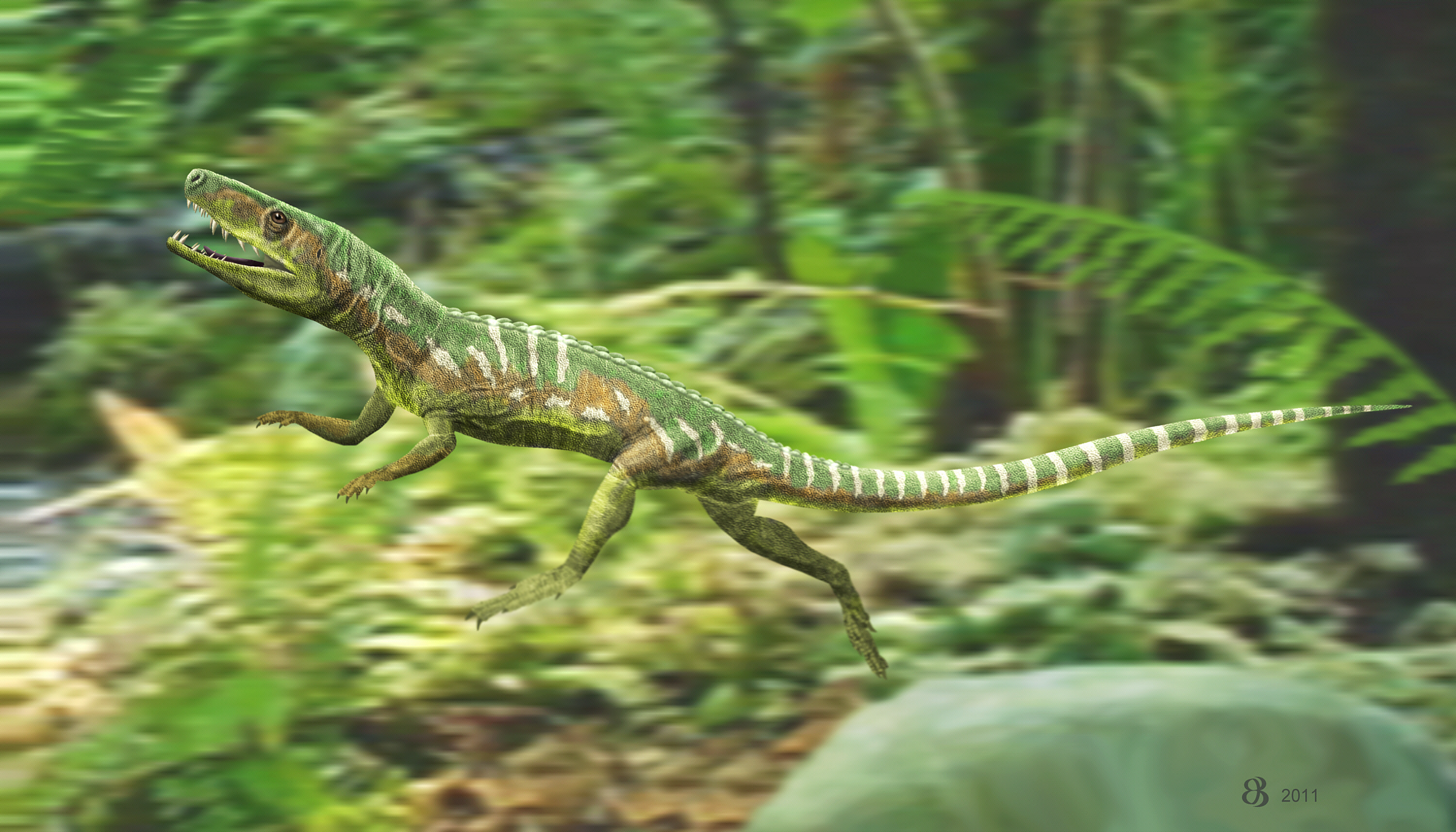
Life reconstruction of Euparkeria capensis

Euparkeriids, as well as several other advanced archosauriformes or early archosaurs (Dorosuchus, Dongusuchus, gracilisuchids) were lightly built and agile terrestrial carnivores which likely competed with cynodonts for food. They had gracile but well-ossified femurs which were capable of, but not well adapted for, bipedalism and cursoriality.

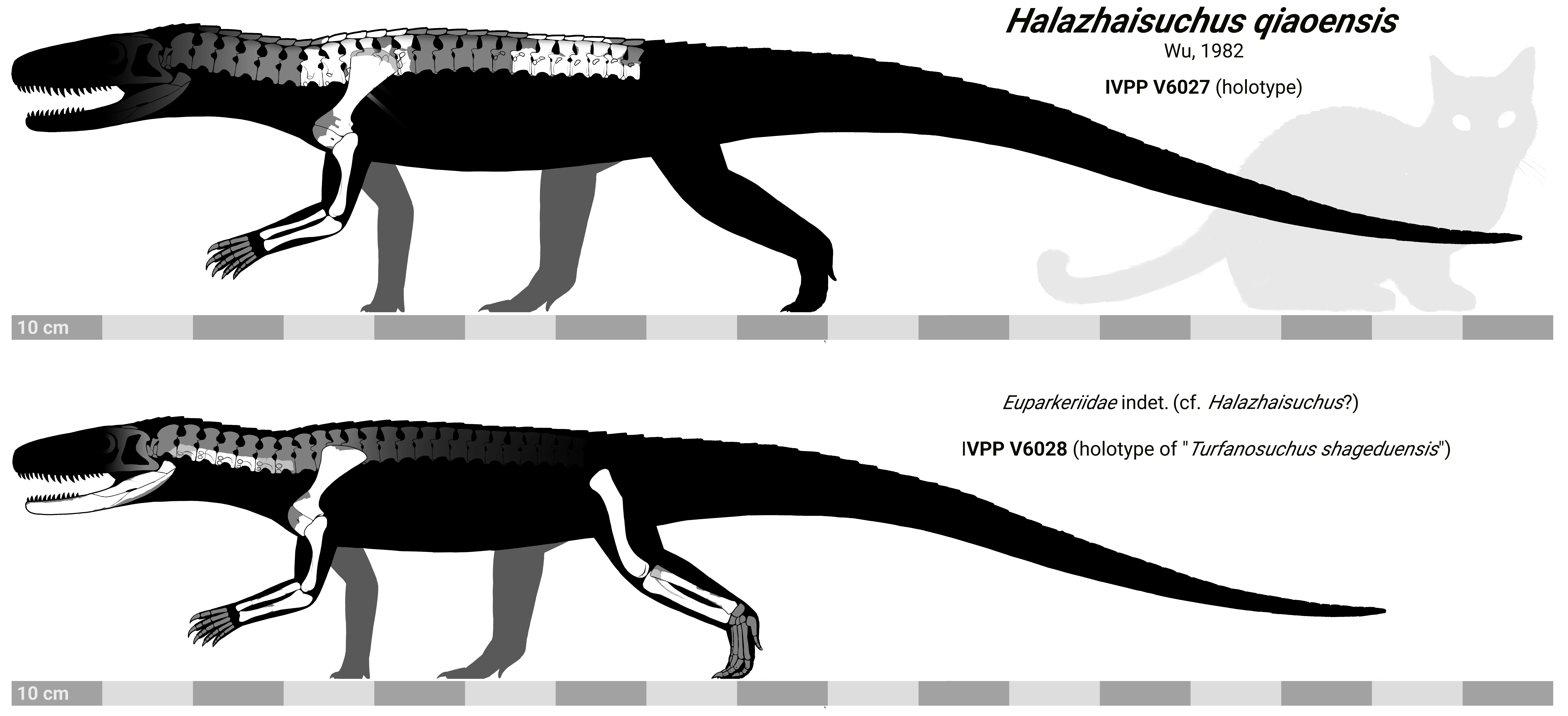
Skeletal reconstruction of the holotype of Halazhaisuchus, and an euparkeriid specimen similar to it (previously thought to be a new species of the gracilisuchid Turfanosuchus)

Most taxa which can be assigned to Euparkeriidae are incomplete, and shared synapomorphies (defining characteristics) are difficult to assess between members of the family. The only uniting trait observable in Euparkeria, Halazhaisuchus, and Osmolskina (the only genera believed to be valid euparkeriids) relates to their osteoderms. Euparkeriids had two rows of small keeled osteoderms with characteristically pointed anterior processes, although some osteoderms referred to Osmolskina are shorter and blunter than those characteristic of the other genera.

Euparkeria and Osmolskina are united by several more traits which may characterize the family but are unknown in the rather incomplete Halazhaisuchus. These include an anterolaterally opening pit on the front of the maxilla, four premaxillary teeth, two exits for the hypoglossal nerve on the exoccipital, and separate interparietals (or postparietals). Osmolskina, Halazhaisuchus, and the dubious (but likely euparkeriid) "Turfanosuchus" shageduensis form a clade within Euparkeriidae united by the presence of a pronounced tuber on the scapula for the m. triceps.

== Classification ==
Besides Euparkeria, the most completely known putative euparkeriid is Osmolskina czatkowicensis. Several hundred isolated bones have been found in Poland and referred to this genus. A 2010 phylogenetic analysis found that Osmolskina was more distantly related to Euparkeria than had previously been suspected, although in 2016 it was reinstated as a member of the family. Dorosuchus neoetus, a Russian archosauriform known mostly by hind limb bones, has also been proposed as a possible euparkeriid, but has subsequently been placed outside the family. Three species from China have also been proposed as euparkeriids: Halazhaisuchus qiaoensis, "Turfanosuchus" shageduensis, and Wangisuchus tzeyii.

Sookias et al. (2014) analysed many species that have been considered euparkeriids, finding many outside the group while recovering a slightly supported monophyletic family including "Turfanosuchus" shageduensis, Halazhaisuchus, and Euparkeria. However, "Turfanosuchus" shageduensis and Wangisuchus were both also found to be nomen dubium. Their cladogram is shown below.

- Archosauriformes
  - Erythrosuchus
  - - Vancleavea
    - - - Chanaresuchus
        - Tropidosuchus
      - - Euparkeriidae
          - Euparkeria
          - - Halazhaisuchus
            - "Turfanosuchus" shageduensis
        - - Phytosauria
            - Parasuchus
            - - Smilosuchus
              - Pseudopalatus
          - Archosauria

Sookias (2016) also performed another study on Euparkeriidae using both parsimony and Bayesian analysis. This study found Halazhaisuchus, Osmolskina, and "Turfanosuchus" shageduensis to all be valid members of a monophyletic (albeit poorly supported) Euparkeriidae, and more closely related to each other than to Euparkeria. Dorosuchus was placed outside Euparkeriidae. The strict consensus tree of the parsimony analysis is given below:

- Archosauriformes
  - Proterosuchus fergusi
  - Sarmatosuchus otschevi
  - - Erythrosuchidae
    - - - Vancleavea campi
        - Doswelliidae
      - - Proterochampsidae
        - - Euparkeriidae
            - Euparkeria capensis
            - - Halazhaisuchus qiaoensis
              - Osmolskina czatkowicensis
              - "Turfanosuchus" shageduensis
          - - Dorosuchus neoetus
            - - Phytosauria
              - Archosauria
                - Pseudosuchia
                - Avemetatarsalia

The Bayesian analysis resolved the trichotomy within Euparkeriidae and recovered Halazhaisuchus and Osmolskina as sister taxa. However, other parts of the tree lost much resolution creating a large polytomy of large groups above Erythrosuchidae. This analysis is given below:

- Archosauriformes
  - Proterosuchus fergusi
  - - Sarmatosuchus otschevi
    - - Erythrosuchidae
      - - Vancleavea campi
        - Koilamasuchus gonzalezdiazi
        - Doswelliidae
        - Proterochampsia
        - - Euparkeriidae
            - Euparkeria capensis
            - - - Halazhaisuchus qiaoensis
                - Osmolskina czatkowicensis
              - "Turfanosuchus" shageduensis
          - Dorosuchus neoetus
          - - - Phytosauria
              - Archosauria
                - Pseudosuchia
                - Avemetatarsalia
