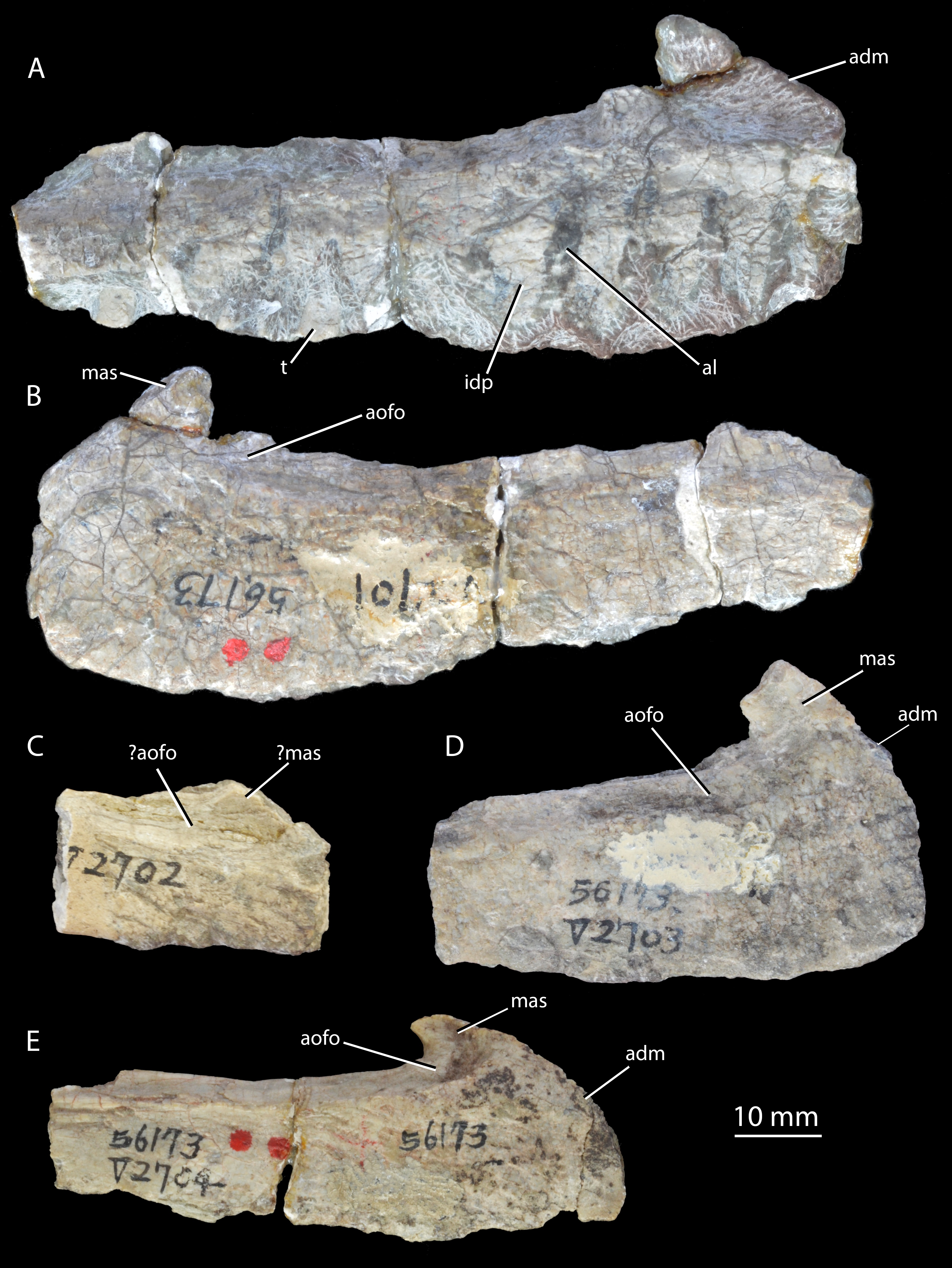
- Fossils

Scientific classification
- Kingdom: Animalia
- Phylum: Chordata
- Class: Reptilia
- Clade: Archosauriformes
- Genus: †Wangisuchus; Young, 1964
- Species: †W. tzeyii

Binomial name
- †Wangisuchus tzeyii Young, 1964

= Wangisuchus =

Wangisuchus Temporal range: Middle Triassic, 242 Ma

Extinct genus of reptiles

Wangisuchus is a dubious extinct genus of archosauriform reptile from the Middle Triassic of China that is known from fragmentary fossil jaw bones. These bones were found at the Hsishihwa locality in the upper Ermaying Formation, which dates to the late Anisian stage about 242 million years ago. Wangisuchus was named in 1964 by Chinese paleontologist Yang Zhongjian, who described a single species, Wangisuchus tzeyii, on the basis of these bones.

== Classification ==
Yang classified Wangisuchus in the family Euparkeriidae, which also includes the much better known Euparkeria from the Early Triassic of South Africa. He diagnosed Wangisuchus by the following characters: long and low shape of the maxilla; pointed posterior process of the maxilla; rounded anterior margin of the maxilla; thecodont tooth implantation; crurotarsal (crocodile-like) structure of the ankle.

Later authors noted that a calcaneum, or ankle bone, referred to Wangisuchus by Yang more closely resembles that of a suchian archosaur, although they didn't discuss whether IVPP V.2701 might be a suchian or euparkeriid. In their review of putative euparkeriids from China, Richard Butler and colleagues concluded that Wangisuchus is a nomen dubium at Archosauriformes indeterminate because its holotype lacked diagnostic characters, even though the thecodont tooth implantation pointed to a closer relationship to Archosauria than to Proterosuchus.
