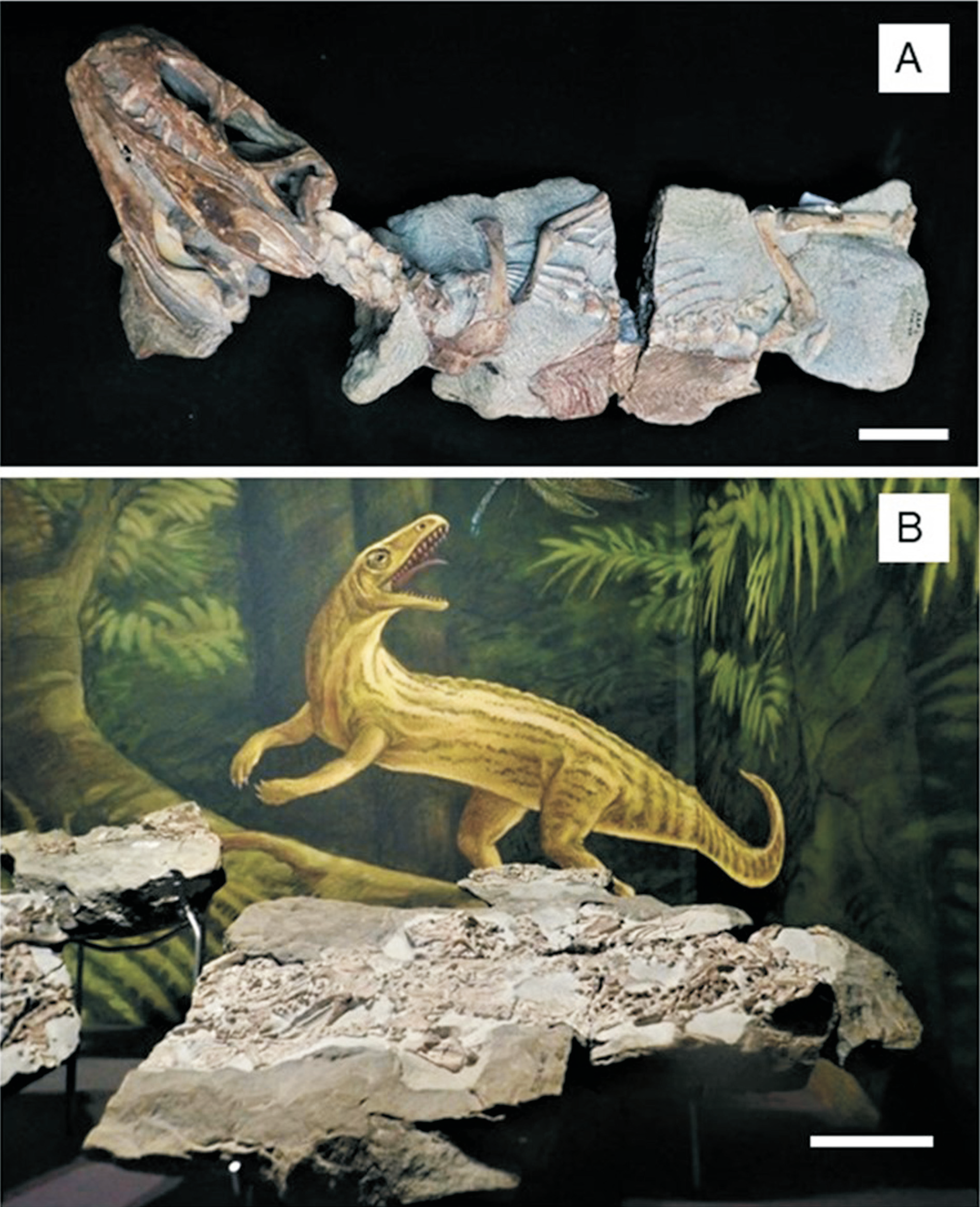
- Euparkeria type specimen SAM-PK-5867 (top) and bonebed SAM-PK-K8050

Scientific classification
- Kingdom: Animalia
- Phylum: Chordata
- Class: Reptilia
- Clade: Eucrocopoda
- Family: †Euparkeriidae
- Genus: †Euparkeria; Broom, 1913

Type species
- †Euparkeria capensis Broom, 1913

Synonyms
- Browniella africana Broom, 1913

= Euparkeria =

Euparkeria Temporal range: late Olenekian – early Anisian?

Extinct genus of reptiles

Euparkeria (/juːˌpɑːrkəˈriːə/; meaning "Parker's good animal", named in honor of W. K. Parker) is an extinct genus of archosauriform reptile from the Triassic of South Africa. Euparkeria is close to the ancestry of Archosauria, the reptile group that includes crocodilians, pterosaurs and dinosaurs (including birds).

Fossils of Euparkeria, including nearly complete skeletons, have been recovered from the Cynognathus Assemblage Zone (CAZ, also known as the Burgersdorp Formation), which hosts the oldest advanced archosauriforms in the fossil-rich Karoo Basin. Tentative dating schemes place the CAZ around the latest Early Triassic (late Olenekian stage) or earliest Middle Triassic (early Anisian stage), approximately 247 million years old.

Euparkeria is among the most heavily described and discussed non-archosaur archosauriforms. It was a small carnivorous reptile with a boxy skull, slender limbs, and two rows of tiny teardrop-shaped osteoderms (bony scutes) along its backbone. Euparkeria is a eucrocopod, meaning that it was among the reptiles most closely related to true crown group archosaurs, according to specializations of the ankle and hindlimbs. The hind limbs were slightly longer than its forelimbs, which has been taken as evidence that it may have been able to rear up on its hind legs as a facultative biped. This conception supplemented older studies which interpreted Euparkeria as a particularly close relative to fully bipedal early dinosaurs. Its normal movement was probably more quadrupedal, with limbs positioned in a semi-erect posture, analogous (but not identical) to a crocodilian high walk. Biomechanical analyses suggests that Euparkeria was incapable of even short periods of bipedal activity.

== History and naming ==
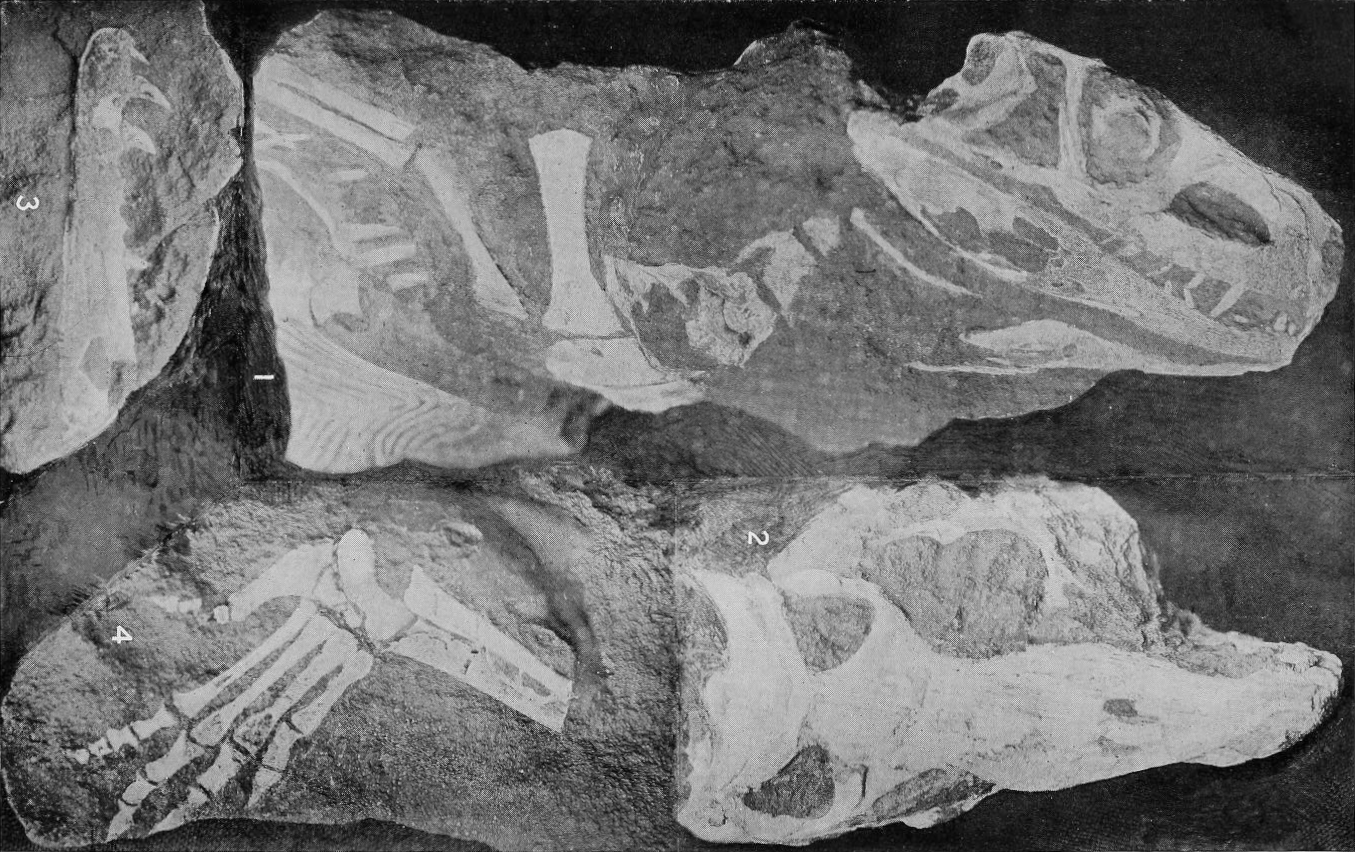
Type and referred individuals of Euparkeria specimens SAM-PK-5867 and SAM-PK-K8309

In the late 1900s South African palaeontologist Alfred Brown collected a collection of small reptiles from beds believed to Upper Triassic around Aliwal North, South Africa. This collection was first studied in 1912 by British palaeontologist D. M. S. Watson who named all of the material Mesosuchus browni. However, the identification of Watson was quickly doubted by South African palaeontologist Robert Broom in 1913, who further examined the material and found that two separate taxa were present. One, showing similarities to the rhynchocephalian Howesia, was described in the most detail by Watson, so Broom established the skull of this form as the lectotype of Mesosuchus, while the other, believed to be a reptile close to Ornithosuchus, was named Euparkeria capensis by Broom. The genus name was in honour of Broom's former professor William Kitchen Parker, in combination with the Ancient Greek prefix ευ- ("eu-") meaning "true" or "good", and the Latin substantive suffix -ia, while the species name presumably refers to the Cape of Good Hope and its namesake the Cape Province. Broom described Euparkeria in much greater detail later in 1913, elaborating that it could be characterized by the nearly complete skull and most of a skeleton of its holotype, and considering it to be a thecodont possibly close to the origins of dinosaurs. The skull of Euparkeria had not yet been fully prepared when Watson studied it, so he would not have been able to see the obvious differences between the two taxa in Brown's collection. In the second 1913 paper Broom also named the new taxon Browniella africana for specimens from Brown's collection that were similar to, but much larger than, the main material of Euparkeria. The genus name for this taxon was in honour of Brown.

Following the death of Brown the material in his collection was acquired by the South African Museum where it was further prepared and studied by South African palaeontologist Sidney Henry Haughton in 1922. Most of the material could be identified as Euparkeria, including the pelvis and shoulder previously considered as part of Browniella, which as a result only preserved its femur. The holotype of Euparkeria was numbered SAM-PK-5867, with five other specimens being assigned, covering almost all of the regions of the skeleton. In addition to the material collected by Brown, in 1924 and 1925 the SAM acquired some of the material collected by Albert W. Higgins under the direction of Brown, while other specimens went to the Institut und Museum für Geologie und Paläontologie of the University of Tübingen, and one specimen went to the University College London. The complete array of Euparkeria specimens was only fully prepared with modern techniques by 1965 under the work of zoologist Rosalie F. Ewer. Ewer also attempted to relocate the original localities of the material of Euparkeria, which was labelled in the museums as coming from "Krielfontein", but even with the assistance of local authorities no such location could be found. Through the guidance of D. N. de Wet, who had known Brown as a child, Ewer was able to identify a probably locality of Broom's collecting as a layer of sandstone in the Cynognathus Assemblage Zone, with the fragmentation and material matching so close that it could be possible that all remains of Euparkeria had come from this single locality. Ewer also identified that the material of Browniella belonged to only one individual, and that following Haughton this individual could be assigned to Euparkeria, making Browniella a junior synonym.

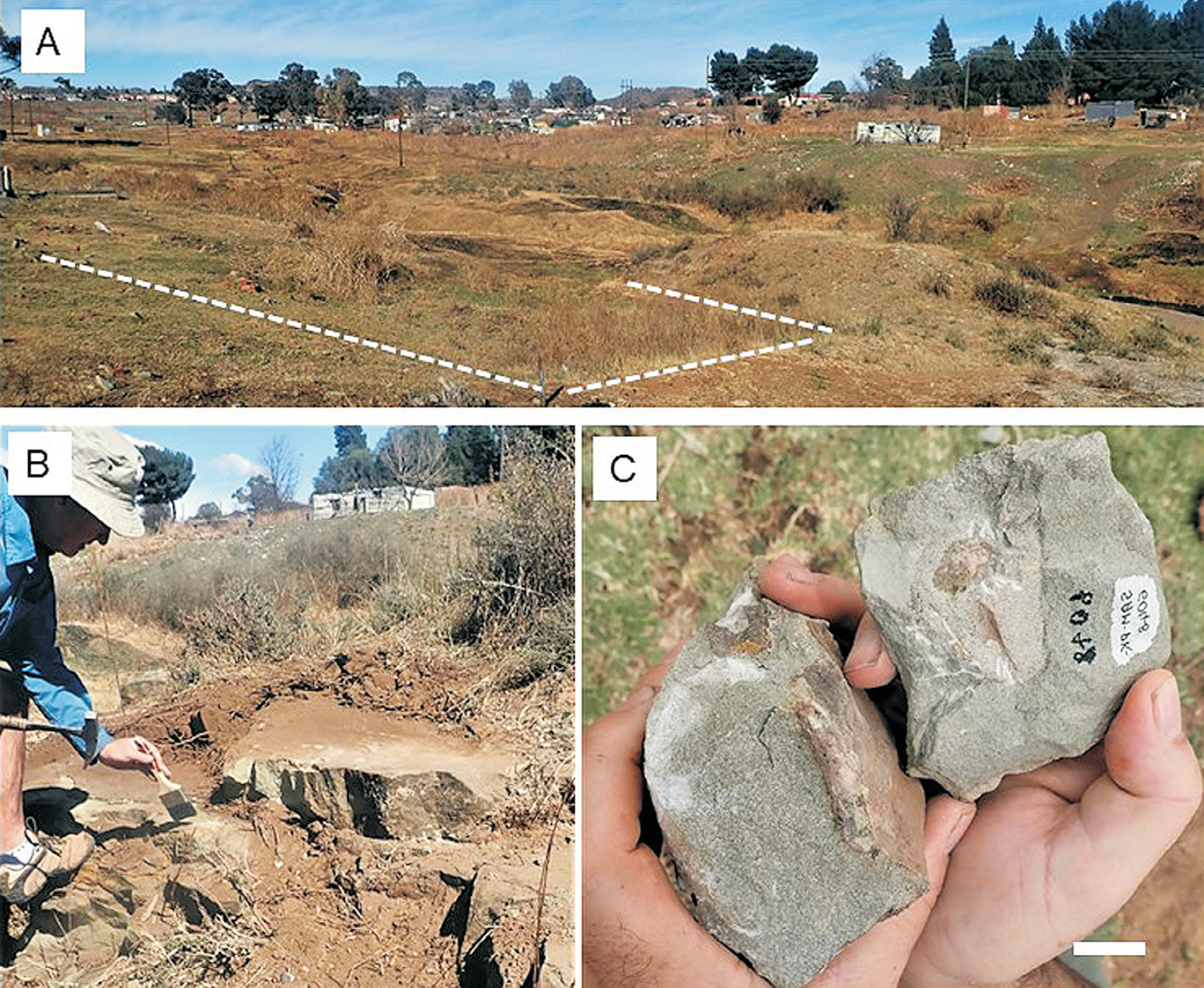
Relocated type locality of Euparkeria in Aliwal North

Further rediscovery of location notes by Brown identify a different location from that proposed by Ewer. These notes detail that the first specimens were discovered in a stone quarry of Alexander Alcock, identified during preparation of slabs by a worker identified as "Mr. Gibbs" on 22 July 1907. This material was available for study by Watson and thus would have included the types of Mesosuchus and Euparkeria, but subsequent discoveries at the same quarry on 21 July 1912 were not. The notes also confirm the quarry was alongside "Krietfontein Spruit", which is recorded as a cluster of mineral springs in town records of Aliwal North. The location of the springs and quarry were confirmed by British and South African palaeontologists Roger M. H. Smith and Frederik P. Wolvaardt in 2019. The Cynognathus AZ in the Karoo Basin of South Africa is equivalent with the Burgersdorp Formation, as the youngest deposits of the Beaufort Group. Euparkeria is only known from a single locality within the Cynognathus AZ, as part of the subzone characterized by synapsids Trirachodon and Kannemeyeria. Through biostratigraphy, the Trirachodon–Kannemeyeria subzone can be correlated with the early Anisian and possibly latest Olenekian, establishing an approximate age for Euparkeria, which was found 23 m (75 ft) above the base of the subzone.

== Classification ==
=== Ancestor of archosaurs ===
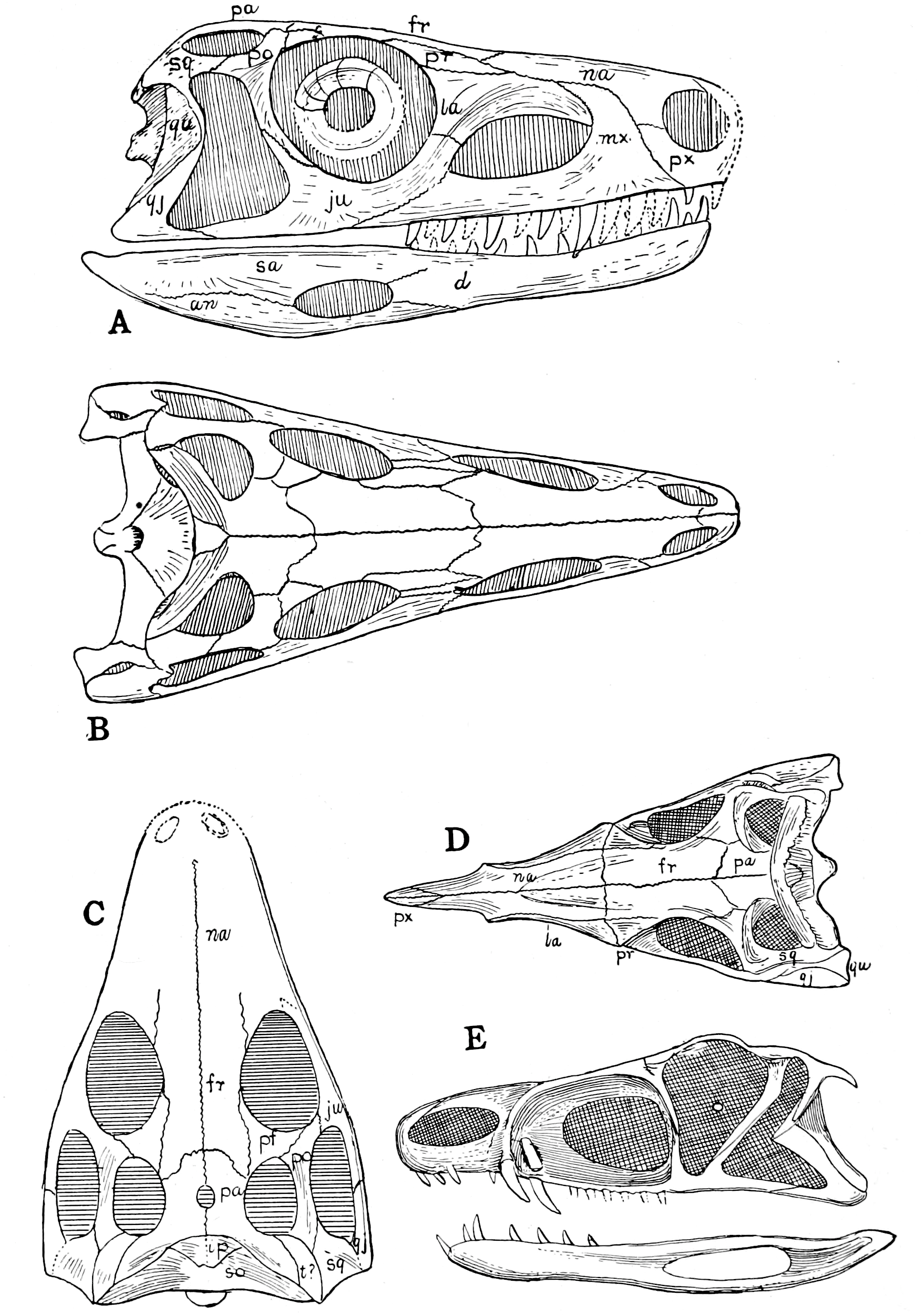
Skulls of the "pseudosuchians" Euparkeria, Ornithosuchus and Younginia

Brom's initial interpretation of Euparkeria was that it represented an early reptile very close to the common ancestor of crocodiles, dinosaurs, birds and pterosaurs, as a relative of rhynchocephalians, phytosaurs and gnathodonts. Broom refined this later in 1913 to the classification of Euparkeria as a member of Pseudosuchia, which he treated as an equivalent name for Thecodontia, and as an ancestral group of unspecialized reptiles that would give rise to dinosaurs, birds and pterosaurs. Watson in 1917 placed Euparkeria within Ornithosuchidae as a thecodont, alongside Ornithosuchus, Scleromochlus and Sphenosuchus, which he interpreted as direct ancestors of theropod dinosaurs. German palaeontologist Friedrich von Huene instead treated Thecodontia as a larger group than Pseudosuchia, introducing the new pseudosuchian family Euparkeriidae in 1920 for Euparkeria and Browniella. Huene would reiterate this classification of thecodonts and Euparkeria in 1922 and 1936, and elaborated in 1948 that euparkeriids would be descended from ornithosuchids and serve as precursors of saurischians. He considered them the closest relatives of Sphenosuchidae, the ancestors of crocodiles, and Scleromochlidae, the probable ancestors of pterosaurs. These three families would be the most specialized and final thecodonts before the group diverged.

The pre-cladistic schemes of classification of Euparkeria and other thecodonts largely followed Huene over the succeeding decades, with American palaeontologist Alfred Sherwood Romer maintaining Euparkeria (as the only member of Euparkeriidae) as a pseudosuchian thecodont close to Erpetosuchidae, Teleosauridae, Elastichosuchidae and Prestosuchidae in 1966, and then elaborating on this in 1972 with the introduction of Wangisuchus as a possible euparkeriid and the limiting of Pseudosuchia to euparkeriids, ornithosuchids and scleromochlids. Alternative suggestions for the placement of Euparkeria include intermediate between the thecodont groups Proterosuchia and Pseudosuchia or as a member of the proterosuchian family Erythrosuchidae. Argentine palaeontologist José Bonaparte treated euparkeriids as the ancestral taxa to dinosaurs, ornithosuchids and sphenosuchids in 1976, placing the family, limited to Euparkeria, as the ancestral member of the pseudosuchian infraorder Ornithosuchia from which the various groups evolved. Ornithosuchia was separated from Pseudosuchia by Indian palaeontologist Sankar Chatterjee in 1982, where it was believed that Euparkeria gave rise to ornithosuchids and Lagosuchus (within the separate suborder Lagosuchia). Dinosaurs were believed by Chatterjee to have been two separate unrelated groups, evolving separately from different thecodont ancestors. This classification was based on a misinterpretation of the ankle joint in dinosaurs, with British palaeontologists Arthur Cruickshank and Michael Benton showing in 1985 that dinosaurs shared the same ankle type, and while they evolved from reptiles similar to Ornithosuchus and Euparkeria, neither genus was a direct ancestor of later forms, with Euparkeria preceding the crocodile–dinosaur split, and Ornithosuchus as an early relative of dinosaurs.

=== Removal from Archosauria ===
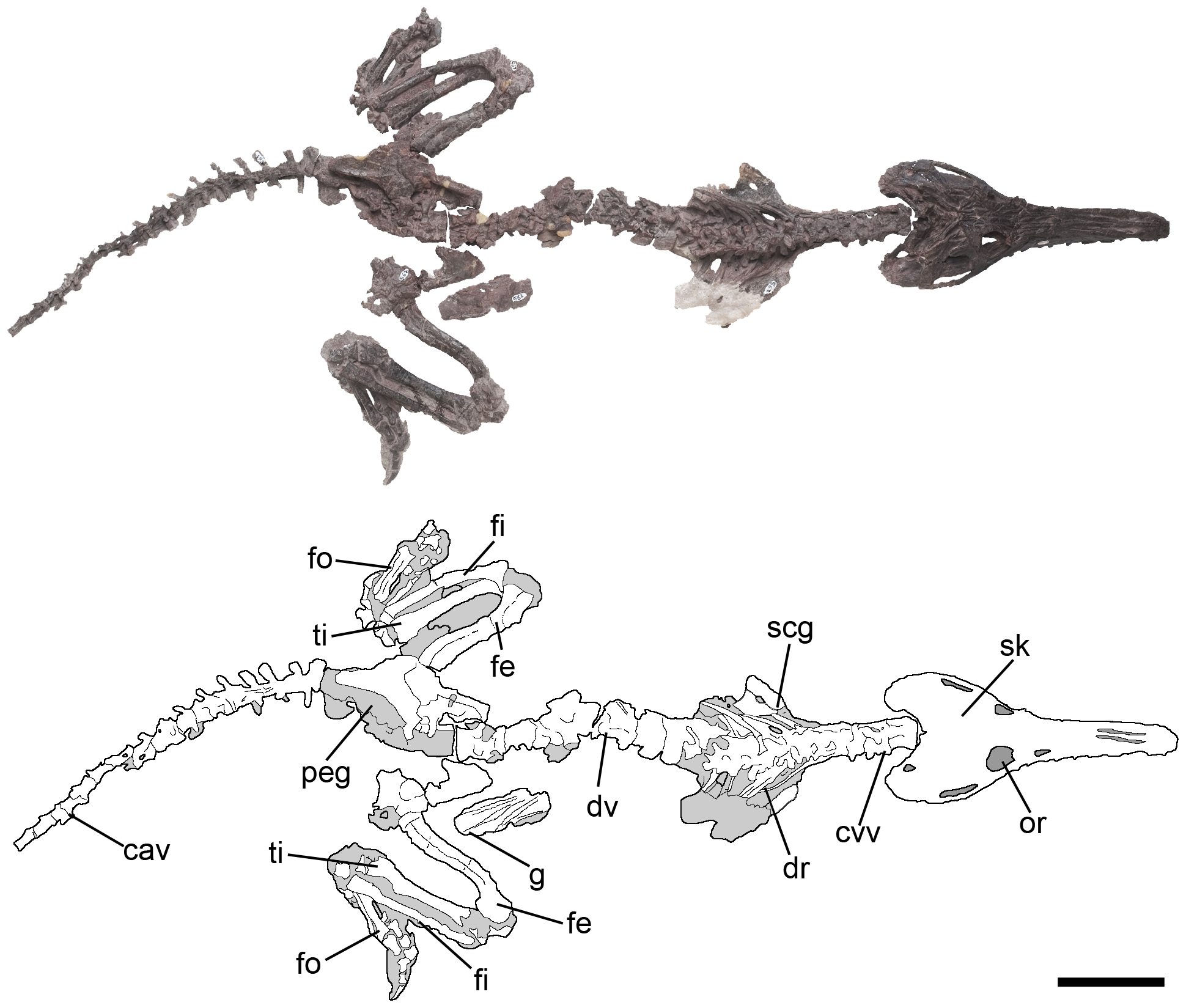
Skeleton of the proterochampsid Pseudochampsa, a group close to Euparkeria outside of Archosauria

Introductions of phylogenetic analysis to the study of the origins of archosaurs was begun in 1986 by American palaeontologist Jacques Gauthier, who evaluated the origins of birds relative to dinosaurs, crocodiles, and "thecodonts". As "thecodonts" were a paraphyletic group excluding their descendents, Gauthier advocated for abandoning it as a term, and he modified the contents of Pseudosuchia to represent the crocodile-line archosaurs. Euparkeria had previously been considered close to the origins of birds by Broom and others, as it was unspecialized in a way that could have allowed it to evolve into birds without reversals of features, but through analysis Gauthier instead found that birds were definitively descended from dinosaurs, and Euparkeria, of relevance to the divergence of crocodiles and birds, was found as the earliest member of the bird-line archosaurs he used the name Ornithosuchia for. The 1988 analysis of Benton and American palaeontologist James M. Clark found similar results for Euparkeria, but moved it just outside the crocodile-bird split. Benton and Clark did retain Euparkeria as an archosaur though, as while Gauthier used the name for just the crown group, Benton and Clark expanded its contents to also include extinct taxa that preceded the crocodile-bird divergence such as Euparkeria. Subsequent analyses throughout the 1990s supported Euparkeria as outside crown-group Archosauria, and also moved Ornithosuchidae from the bird line to crocodile line, advocating for the abandonment of Ornithosuchia as a name for the bird-line archosaurs as the group no longer included Ornithosuchus. They also used Archosauria as the name for the crown group, relegating Euparkeria to the status of a non-archosaurian archosauromorph, with their results also supporting Proterochampsidae between Euparkeria and archosaurs. Benton continued to use Archosauria as the larger group including Euparkeria in 1999, creating the new name Avesuchia for the crown group.

Following these early and largely independent analysis, it was established that the consensus of archosaur evolution was that proterosuchids, erythrosuchids, Euparkeria and proterochampsids formed a series of groups outside but leading to Archosauria, with Archosauria being separated into crocodile-line and bird-line groups. Phytosaurs would be the earliest members of the crocodile line, and pterosaurs would be the earliest members of the bird line, though the position of ornithosuchids along the crocodile line was uncertain. Subsequent analyses largely reused the same characters and taxa of those from the 1990s, up to the 2011 study of archosaur origins by American palaeontologist Sterling Nesbitt. Like previous studies, Nesbitt found that Euparkeria was a close relative of archosaurs but not a true archosaur, though it was closer to the crocodile-bird divergence than proterochampsids. Phytosaurs were removed from the crocodile line and instead placed as the closest relatives of archosaurs, between Euparkeria and Archosauria, with ornithosuchids as the earliest pseudosuchians (the name applied to crocodile-line archosaurs) and pterosaurs as the earliest avemetatarsalians (the name applied to bird-line archosaurs).

=== Euparkeriids ===
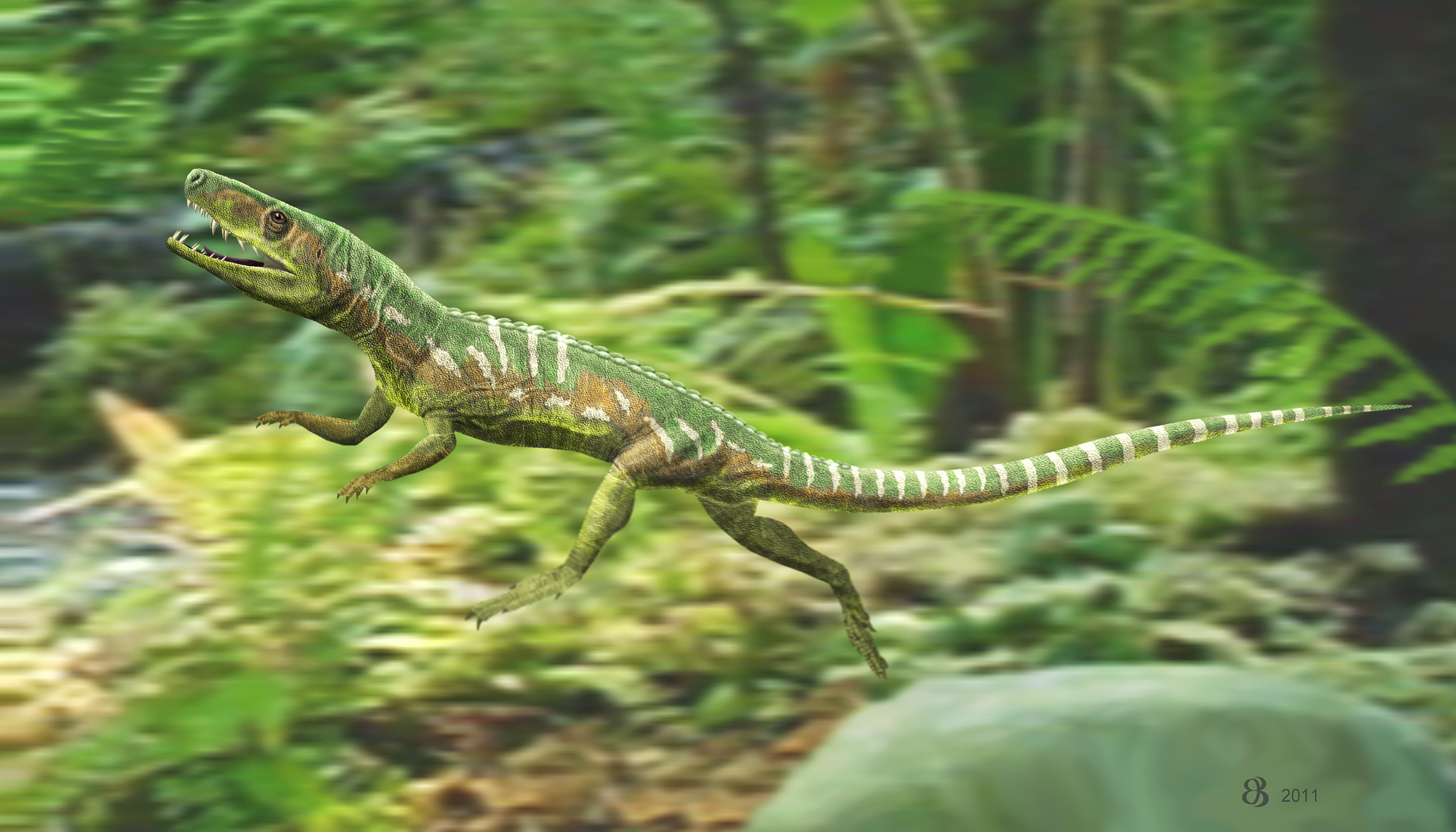
Artist's interpretation of a jumping Euparkeria

While Euparkeria was not found to have any close relatives in phylogenetic analyses, multiple putative euparkeriids had been noted previously, leading British palaeontologists Roland B. Sookias and Richard J. Butler to define and reassess Euparkeriidae in 2013. The potential euparkeriids Osmolskina, Dorosuchus, Wangisuchus, Halazhaisuchus and "Turfanosuchus" shageduensis were noted from the Olekenian to Anisian of Poland, Russia and China, while Turfanosuchus, Xilousuchus, Platysuchus and Dongusia, at times considered relatives of Euparkeria or euparkeriids, were identified as either pseudosuchians or undiagnostic archosauromorphs. Osmolskina was the only "euparkeriid" to also be included in a phylogenetic analysis, but the results were inconclusive with it either close to Euparkeria or slightly further away, without an unambiguous Euparkeriidae recovered. In 2014 Sookias and colleagues separately reassessed the Chinese "euparkeriids" and Dorosuchus to determine whether they could be supported as relatives of Euparkeria. Redescribing them and adding them to the analysis of Nesbitt found that Dorosuchus was an archosauriform close to Euparkeria but not a member of Euparkeriidae, while Halazhaisuchus and "T." shageduensis were weakly supported as euparkeriids. "T." shageduensis was not diagnostic and so was not given its own genus name as it did not belong to Turfanosuchus and was possibly a synonym of Halazhaisuchus. Wangisuchus was found to be an undiagnostic archosauromorph and was not included in the analysis. Sookias expanded this analysis further in 2016 finding support for Osmolskina as a member of Euparkeriidae as well, with Euparkeria was the most primitive member of the family. The position of euparkeriids relative to archosaur origins remained the same as previously.

The 2016 phylogenetic analysis of archosauromorphs by Argentine palaeontologist Martín Ezcurra contrasted with the analyses of Nesbitt and Sookias in the placement of Euparkeria relative to Archosauria, finding it to be further from the group than proterochampsians, with phytosaurs as early pseudosuchians as in earlier studies. While Dorosuchus was included and found to be a non-euparkeriid as in the studies of Sookias, the Chinese euparkeriids were not analyses so the status of Euparkeriidae was left uncertain. At the same time, the new clade Eucrocopoda was named for all archosauromorphs more derived than erythrosuchids, encompassing Euparkeria and close relatives, proterochampsians and archosaurs. Subsequent iteration of the Ezcurra analysis added Halazhaisuchus and Osmolskina for the purposes of assessing morphological disparity rather than phylogenetic relationships, resulting in their exclusion from analysis for assessment of relationships, though when included they can be unresolved, support a Euparkeriidae including Euparkeria, Osmolskina, Halazhaisuchus and the specimen NMQR 3570, or recover Euparkeria further from Archosauria than the other taxa. Analyses based on Nesbitt and Sookias recover a consistent Euparkeriidae, and have also found the eucrocopodan Marcianosuchus to be very close to the family. The consensus of Euparkeria relationships described by Sookias in 2020 is shown below.

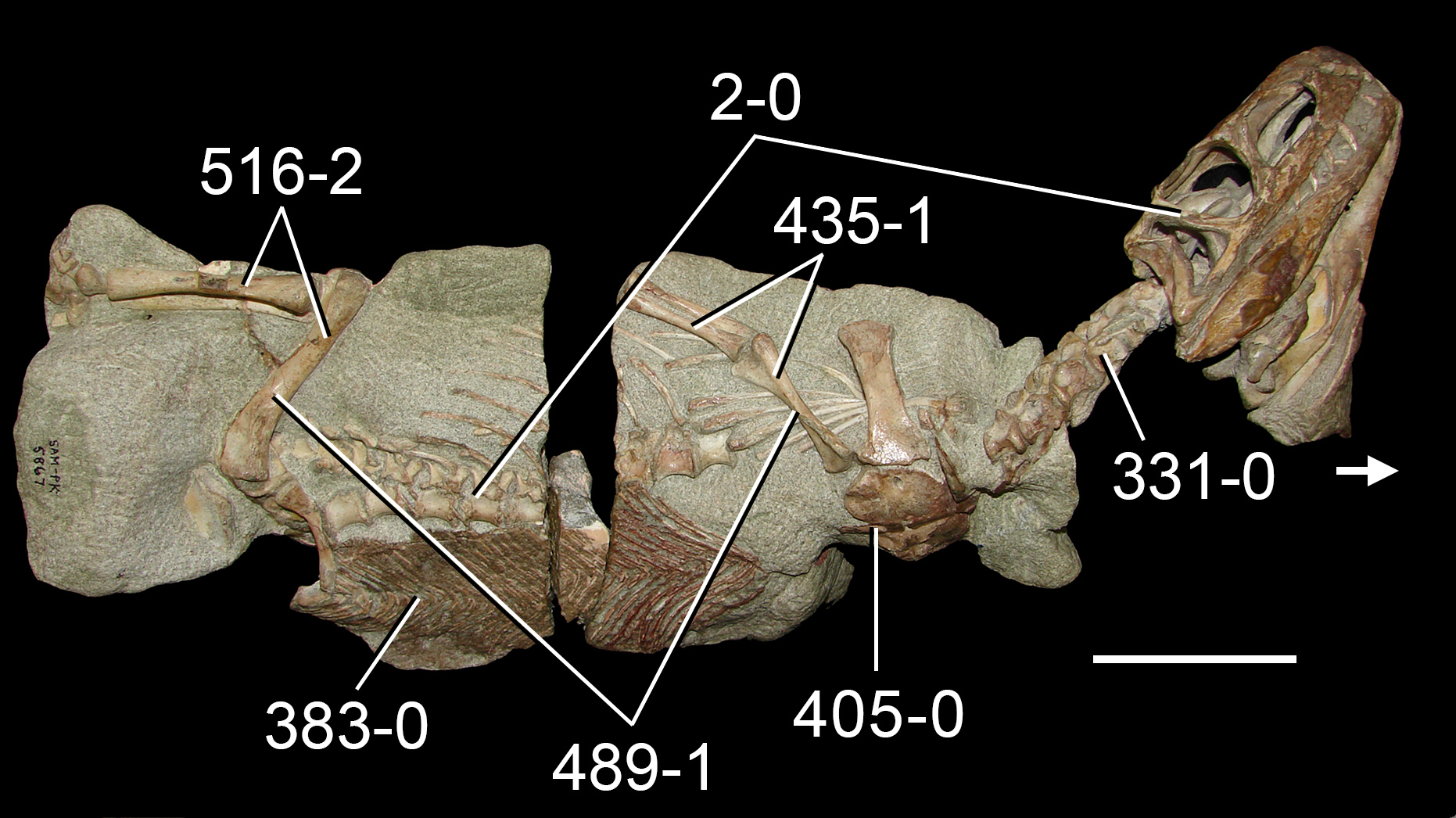
Holotype skeleton SAM-PK-5867 of Euparkeria highlighting features supporting its position as a close relative of archosaurs

- Archosauriformes
  - Prolacertidae
  - - Proterosuchidae
    - - Erythrosuchidae
      - - Dorosuchus
        - - Euparkeriidae
            - Euparkeria
            - - Halazhaisuchus
              - Osmolskina
          - - Proterochampsia
            - Archosauria
              - - Phytosauria
                - Other Pseudosuchia
              - - - Teleocrater
                  - Dongusuchus
                - Ornithodira

== Palaeobiology ==
=== Locomotion ===
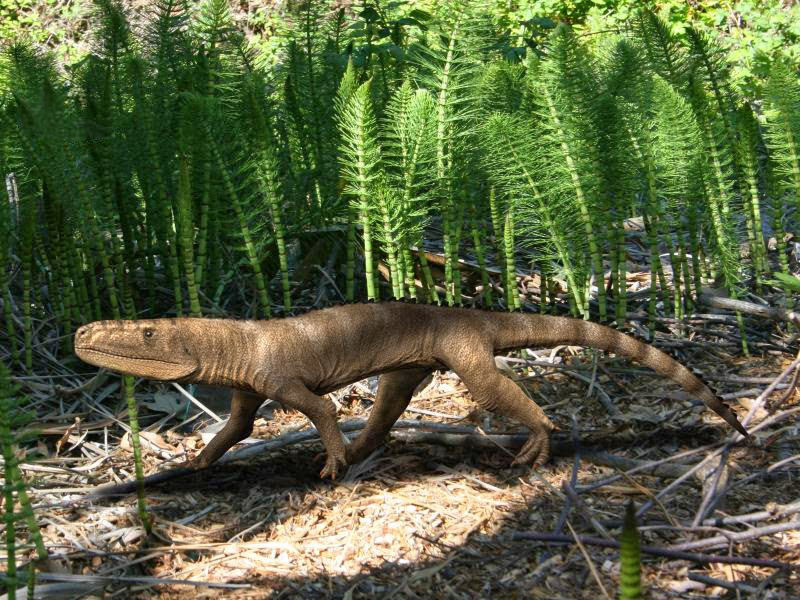
Life reconstruction of Euparkeria capensis in a quadrupedal pose with semi-erect limbs

The hind limbs of Euparkeria are somewhat longer than its forelimbs, which has led some researchers to conclude that it could have occasionally walked on its hind legs as a facultative biped. Other possible adaptations to bipedalism in Euparkeria include rows of osteoderms that could stabilize the back and a long tail that could act as a counterbalance to the rest of the body. Paleontologist Rosalie Ewer suggested in 1965 that Euparkeria spent most of its time on four legs but moved on its hind legs whilst running.

However, adaptations to bipedalism in Euparkeria are not as obvious as they are in some other Triassic archosauriforms such as dinosaurs and poposauroids; the forelimbs are still relatively long, and the head is so large that the tail might not have effectively counterbalanced its weight. The position of muscle anchorage points on the humerus or thigh bones suggest that Euparkeria could not have held its legs in a fully erect posture beneath its body but would have held them slightly out to the side as in modern crocodilians and most other quadrupedal Triassic archosauriforms. Euparkeria has a large backward-pointing projection on the calcaneum (an ankle bone) that would have given strong leverage to the ankle during locomotion. A calcaneal projection might have enabled Euparkeria to move with all four limbs in a semi-erect "high walk" similar to the way in which living crocodilians sometimes move about on land.

A 2020 study of range of motion in the hindlimbs of Euparkeria found conflicting evidence for its posture. The structure of the femur (thigh bone) and hip socket suggest that the legs were capable of a very wide range of motion, ranging from a nearly vertical stance to a thigh which projects forwards, backwards, or outwards at a nearly horizontal angle. Rotation of the thigh was more limited, a factor that argues against a sprawling gait reliant on broad outward leg sweeps. Although the hip socket argues in favor of an upright 'pillar-erect' hindlimb stance, the structure of the tibia (inner shin bone) and ankle show that the lower legs and feet would have splayed outwards during normal usage, supporting a semi-erect rather than fully erect stance. The hindlimbs of Euparkeria have been used to argue that the evolution of a fully erect gait in true archosaurs was a stepwise process which first developed in bones closer to the hip.

A 2023 paper analyzed the possibility of facultative bipedalism and came to the conclusion that Euparkeria was quadrupedal at all times. Models of weight distribution found that the center of mass for Euparkeria was far in front of the hips, meaning that a body held horizontally during a bipedal stance would have to fight against a very large forward pitching moment. This pitching moment far exceeds that of modern long-limbed lizards capable of facultative bipedalism. The pitching moment would only stabilize if the body was held up at an implausibly high angle (>60 degrees), regardless of how the tail was held. In addition, models of muscle activation indicate that the ankle plantarflexor group (the muscles which bend the foot down to maintain stability) would have been overexerted to the point of failure if a bipedal posture was attempted by the animal.

A recent comparative study of bone cross-sectional geometry also inferred a fully quadrupedal locomotion in Euparkeria.

=== Nocturnality ===
Some specimens of Euparkeria preserve bony rings in the eye sockets called scleral rings, which in life would have supported the eye. The scleral ring of Euparkeria is most similar to those of modern birds and reptiles that are nocturnal, suggesting that Euparkeria had a lifestyle adapted to low-light conditions. During the Early Triassic the Karoo Basin was at about 65 degrees south latitude, meaning that Euparkeria would have experienced long periods of darkness in winter months.

=== Life history ===
Osteohistological analysis of Euparkeria suggests that it grew ontogenetically at a moderate pace, and that it did not exhibit any variation in growth tempo indicative of growth cycles found in other archosauriform sauropsids.

== Palaeoecology ==
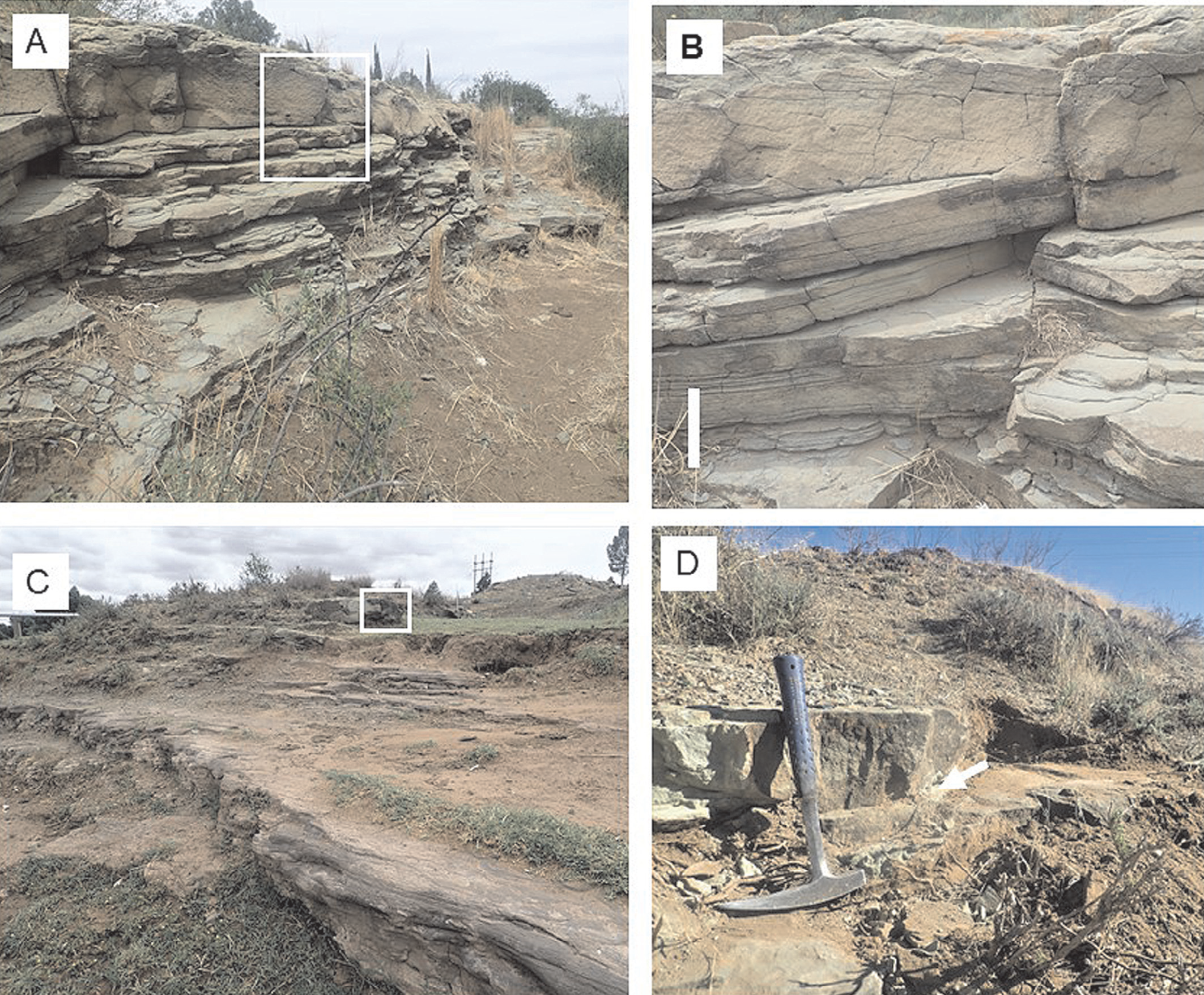
Sediments of the type locality of Euparkeria in the Burgersdorp Formation

Euparkeria is only known from a very restricted portion of the Cynognathus Assemblage Zone, which is a significant biostratigraphic division of the Beaufort Group of South Africa and equivalent to the lithostratigraphic Burgersdorp Formation. Cynognathus is a common and key indicator of this zone, which can be divided into an older Langbergia–Garjainia Subzone, a middle Trirachodon–Kannemeyeria Subzone where Euparkeria has been found, and a younger Cricodon–Ufudocyclops Subzone. The CAZ is known from a diverse and well-established flora and fauna, though the Trirachodon–Kannemeyeria Subzone is known for only rare complete skeletons, with typically dispersed but well-preserved tetrapod fossils in mudstone and siltstone overbank deposits. Complete tetrapod skulls are known from sandstone layers, while localized bonebeds of fragmentary synapsids and amphibians can be found in the mudstones. The subzone deposits are between 500 m (1,600 ft) and 70 m (230 ft) thick, being 150 m (490 ft) thick in the area of Aliwal North. The sandstones are multiple shades of grey in colour, and coprolites, rhizocretions, roots and petrified wood can be found. These deposits are believed to have been the result of a high-sinuosity meandering river system with frequent overbank flooding and breeching of levees. No radiometric dating has been done within the Trirachodon–Kannemeyeria Subzone to establish a definitive age, but correlations with many other formations across Triassic Pangea suggest an early Anisian and possibly latest Olenekian age. It is possible that the CAZ can be correlated with younger radiometric dating of the Río Seco de la Quebrada Formation of Brazil, which would move the Burgersdorp Formation into the late Anisian to Carnian and could correlate the changing climate with the Carnian pluvial episode.

The locality of Euparkeria in the quarry along Krietfontein Spruit is 23 m (75 ft) above the base of the Trirachodon–Kannemeyeria Subzone, in the region where the deposits change from low-sinuosity channels to a more meandering river system. The regional climate is considered to have been warm and semi-arid with seasonal rainfall during the lower Burgersdorp, becoming colder and wetter over time but maintaining seasonality. A bonebed of Euparkeria and Mesosuchus from slightly lower than the type locality containing approximately 50 individuals shows a wide diversity of taphonomy suggesting the accumulation of desiccated carcasses before burial alongside those that were buried rapidly and perhaps trampled, as a concentration during a flood event. Alternate specimens of Euparkeria associated with tree trunks and plant debris also corroborate a mass-drowning. The death accumulation of Euparkeria and Mesosuchus on top of a low point bar may indicate a preferred habitat of the riparian forests alongside watercourses, and the vegetated sandbars between watercourses, and at the same time Euparkeria may have been the principal scavengers of the carcasses causing the bone scatter and trampling.
