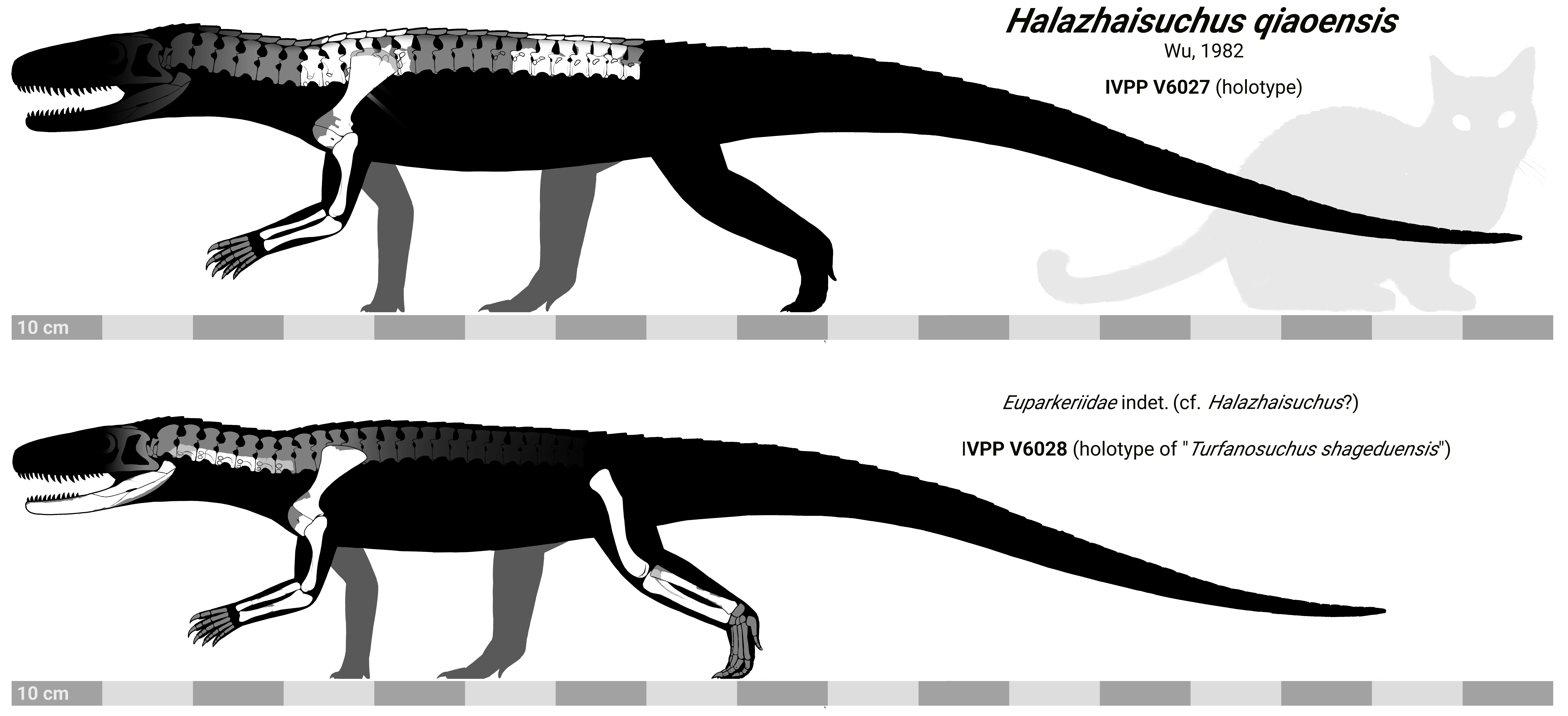
- Skeletal reconstruction of the holotype of Halazhaisuchus, and an euparkeriid specimen similar to it (previously thought to be a new species of the gracilisuchid Turfanosuchus)
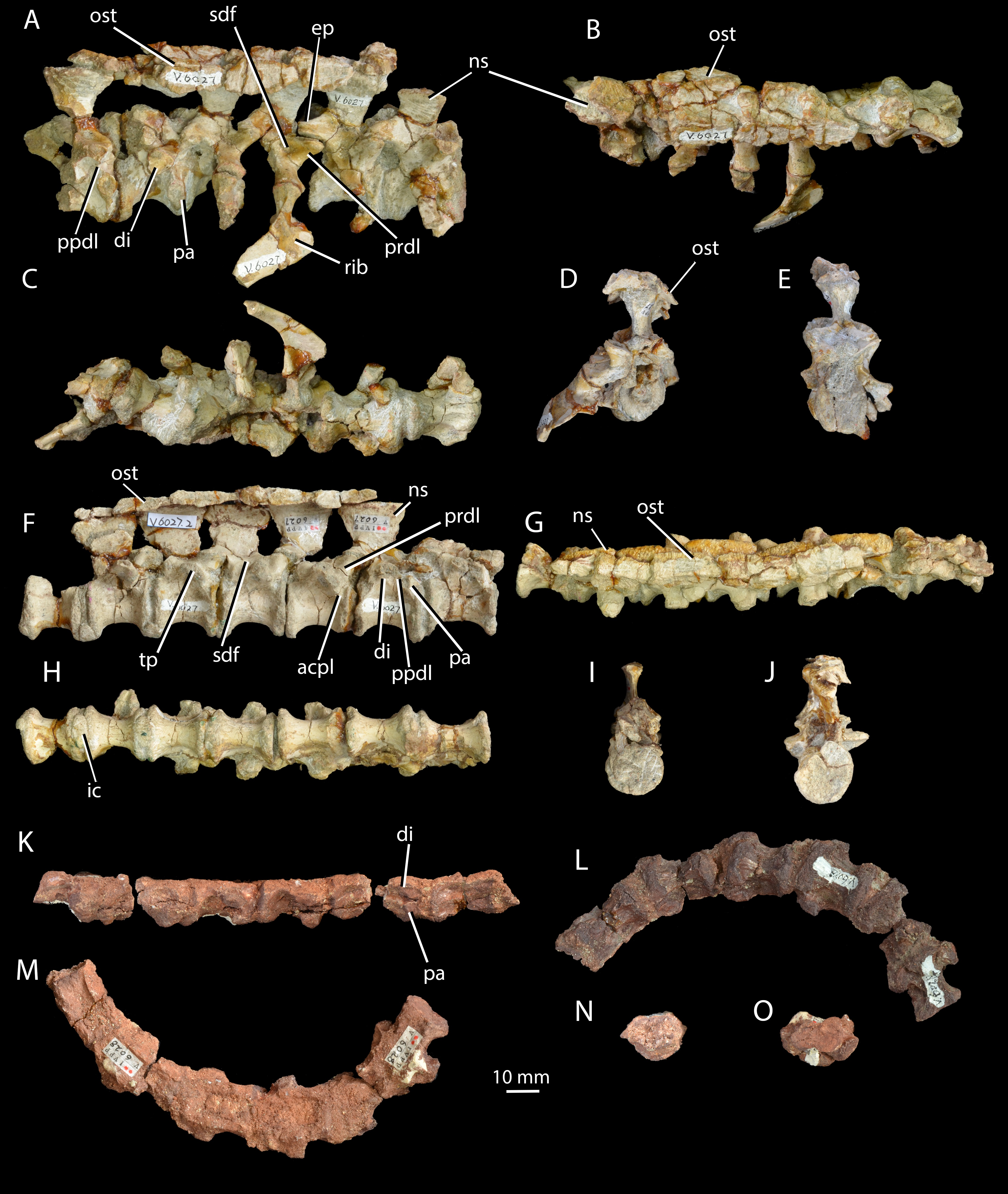
- Halazhaisuchus qiaoensis and "Turfanosuchus shageduensis" vertebrae

Scientific classification
- Kingdom: Animalia
- Phylum: Chordata
- Class: Reptilia
- Family: †Euparkeriidae
- Genus: †Halazhaisuchus; Wu, 1982

Type species
- †Halazhaisuchus qiaoensis Wu, 1982

= Halazhaisuchus =

Halazhaisuchus Temporal range: Early Triassic, 247–242 Ma

Extinct genus of reptiles

Halazhaisuchus is an extinct genus of archosauriform from the Early Triassic of China. It is known from a single species, Halazhaisuchus qiaoensis, which was named in 1982 from the lower Ermaying Formation in Shaanxi. It was assigned to the family Euparkeriidae as a close relative of the genus Euparkeria from South Africa. Halazhaisuchus is known from a single holotype specimen called V6027, which was discovered in 1977 and includes a portion of the vertebral column, some ribs, two scapulae and two humeri, the right radius and ulna, and a left coracoid. Two rows of plate-like bones called osteoderms run along the length of the vertebrae. When it was first described in 1982, Halazhaisuchus was considered a close relative of Euparkeria because it has primitive features like small intercentra bones between the vertebrae and a large coracoid, not seen in later archosaurs. However, these features are common to many early archosauriforms and are not unique to Euparkeriidae.

== Resemblance between the fauna of the Ermaying Formation and the Cynognathus Assemblage Zone ==
The fauna of the lower Ermaying Formation closely resemble those of the Cynognathus Assemblage Zone in South Africa. Halazhaisuchus is similar to Euparkeria, while the Chinese Parakannemeyeria and Guchengosuchus resemble the South African Kannemeyeria and Erythrosuchus, respectively.
