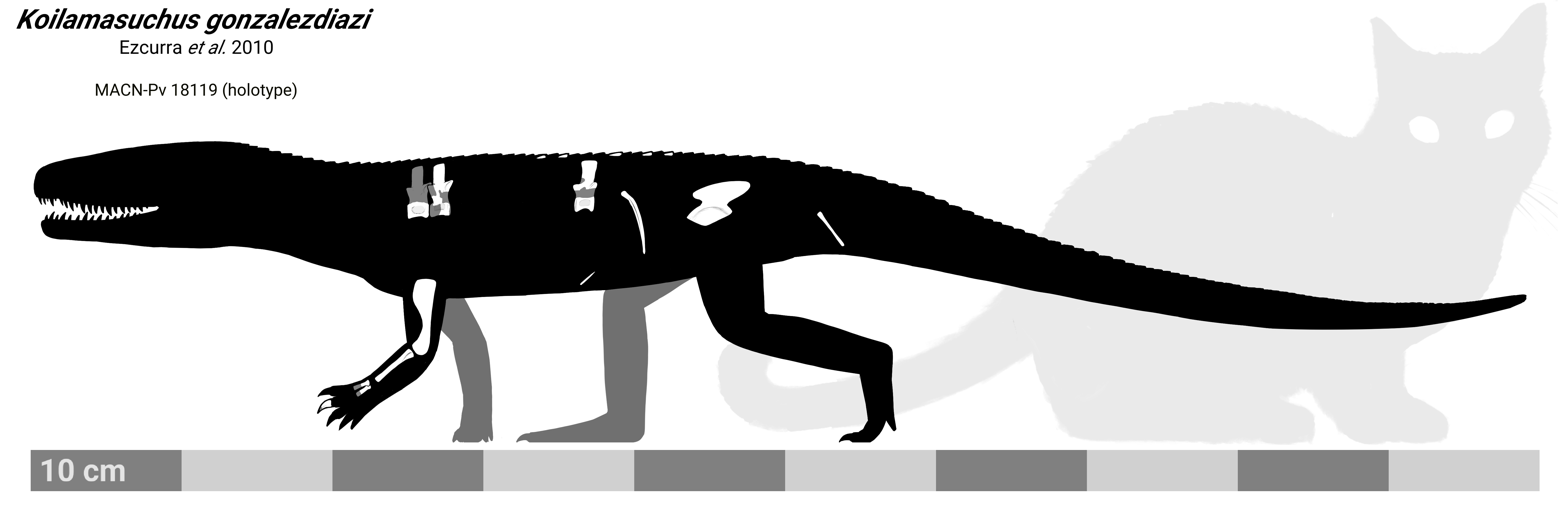
- Skeletal reconstruction showcasing the known remains

Scientific classification
- Kingdom: Animalia
- Phylum: Chordata
- Class: Reptilia
- Clade: Archosauria
- Clade: Pseudosuchia
- Clade: Suchia
- Genus: †Koilamasuchus; Ezcurra et al. 2010

Species
- †K. gonzalezdiazi Ezcurra et al. 2010 (type)

= Koilamasuchus =

Koilamasuchus Temporal range: Middle-Late Triassic Ladinian–Carnian

Extinct genus of reptiles

Koilamasuchus is an extinct genus of indeterminate archosauriform from the Triassic of Argentina. It is based on an external mold of a partial postcranial skeleton from the Quebrada de los Fósiles Formation. Due to its incomplete nature, the relationships of this reptile are difficult to establish. Originally described as a non-archosaur archosauriform, later studies tentatively considered it a doswelliid or a suchian archosaur.

== Discovery ==
Remains have been found in the Quebrada de los Fósiles Formation of the Puesto Viejo Group in Argentina. This locality is probably Ladinian to Carnian (Middle to Late Triassic) in age, although its exact age is debatable. Koilamasuchus is derived from the Latin word 'koilamas' (which means cavity or pocket) and the Greek 'suchus' (which means crocodile). This is in reference to the lateral fossae (pits) on the type specimen's vertebrae. The type species of Koilamasuchus, K. gonzalezdiazi, refers to Dr. Emilio F. Gonzalez Diaz, the paleontologist who discovered the holotype specimen. The fossil has been known since 1981 when it was first described by paleontologist José Bonaparte, but it was not described as a new genus and species until 2010.

The holotype specimen, MACN-Pv 18119, is an external mold of various parts of the postcranial skeleton, including dorsal vertebrae and a dorsal rib, osteoderms, a right ilium, a humerus, an ungual, a chevron, a possible gastralium, two metapodials (either metacarpals or metatarsals), and several indeterminate bones including a possible radius. The mold has several diagnostic features, such as an elongated illiac blade that is convex along its upper margin, that indicate that it is an archosauriform.

== Description ==
In life, Koilamasuchus would have been a small reptile. Based on the proportions of Euparkeria, it would have been approximately 50 centimeters (20 inches) in total length. The dorsal vertebrae are tall, particularly the neural spines. The proximal part of the shaft of the rib curves outwards slightly, but also possesses a notch which forces the rib to strongly project outwards for a short distance and then gradually curve back inwards. A deep sulcus (groove) is also present on the shaft of the rib. The humerus is hourglass-shaped, with an expanded proximal end more than 3.5 times the width of the shaft. The distal end is also expanded to a slightly lesser degree. A wide, slanting ridge (or tuberosity) runs down the shaft of the humerus. The ilium possesses a completely closed acetabulum with a triangular lower edge. The pubic and ischial peduncles are widely separated and the pubic peduncle is rather long while the ischial peduncle is short. One of MACN-Pv 18119's osteoderms is triangular, with a pointed front edge, a slightly rounded rear edge, and a pronounced longitudinal keel. Some other osteoderms are smaller and more oval-shaped.

== Classification ==
A phylogenetic analysis was conducted in the 2010 paper which named and described the genus. Koilamasuchus was found to be closely related to Archosauria, a crown group that includes living crocodilians and birds. It was placed as the sister taxon to a clade containing Archosauria and Erythrosuchidae, a family of large basal archosauriforms. According to the resulting phylogenetic tree, Koilamasuchus is more derived than Osmolskina, Sarmatosuchus, Fugusuchus (commonly thought to be an erythrosuchid), and proterosuchids (which were found to be paraphyletic). Being more derived than these other taxa, Koilamasuchus is closer to the crown group Archosauria.

Koilamasuchus is considered more derived than proterosuchids and other early archosauriforms because it possesses an iliac preacetabular process, or a bony projection near the acetabulum (part of the hip joint). The pubic peduncle, a projection on the ilium that connects it to the pubis and forms part of the front edge of the acetabulum, is angled less than 45° from the bone's vertical axis. This is a derived feature not seen in more basal archosauriforms. Koilamasuchus had dorsal osteoderms covering its back, which are also present in erythrosuchids and some archosaurs, but not in more basal archosauriforms such as proterosuchids.

The 2016 description of Teyujagua placed Koilamasuchus in a polytomy with Fugusuchus and all other non-proterosuchid archosauriforms. A 2016 study on Euparkeriidae included Koilamasuchus in its phylogenetic analysis, and found that it was a basal doswelliid. This classification was supported by the presence of a convex illiac blade with rounded anterior and posterior ends. Nevertheless, the authors noted that the large amount of missing data for the genus makes this assignment uncertain.

In another 2016 analysis on archosauriforms, Koilamasuchus was classified as an archosaur, specifically a basal member of Suchia. Some of the features supporting this classification include the presence of a lateral fossa on each vertebral centra, a humerus with a proximal end that is roughly symmetrical from the front, and a well-developed preacetabular process of the ilium which nevertheless does not extend further forward than the pubic peduncle. However, the osteoderms of MACN-Pv 18119 do not bend along their lateral edge, meaning that Koilamasuchus was more basal than advanced suchians such as members of Paracrocodylomorpha.
