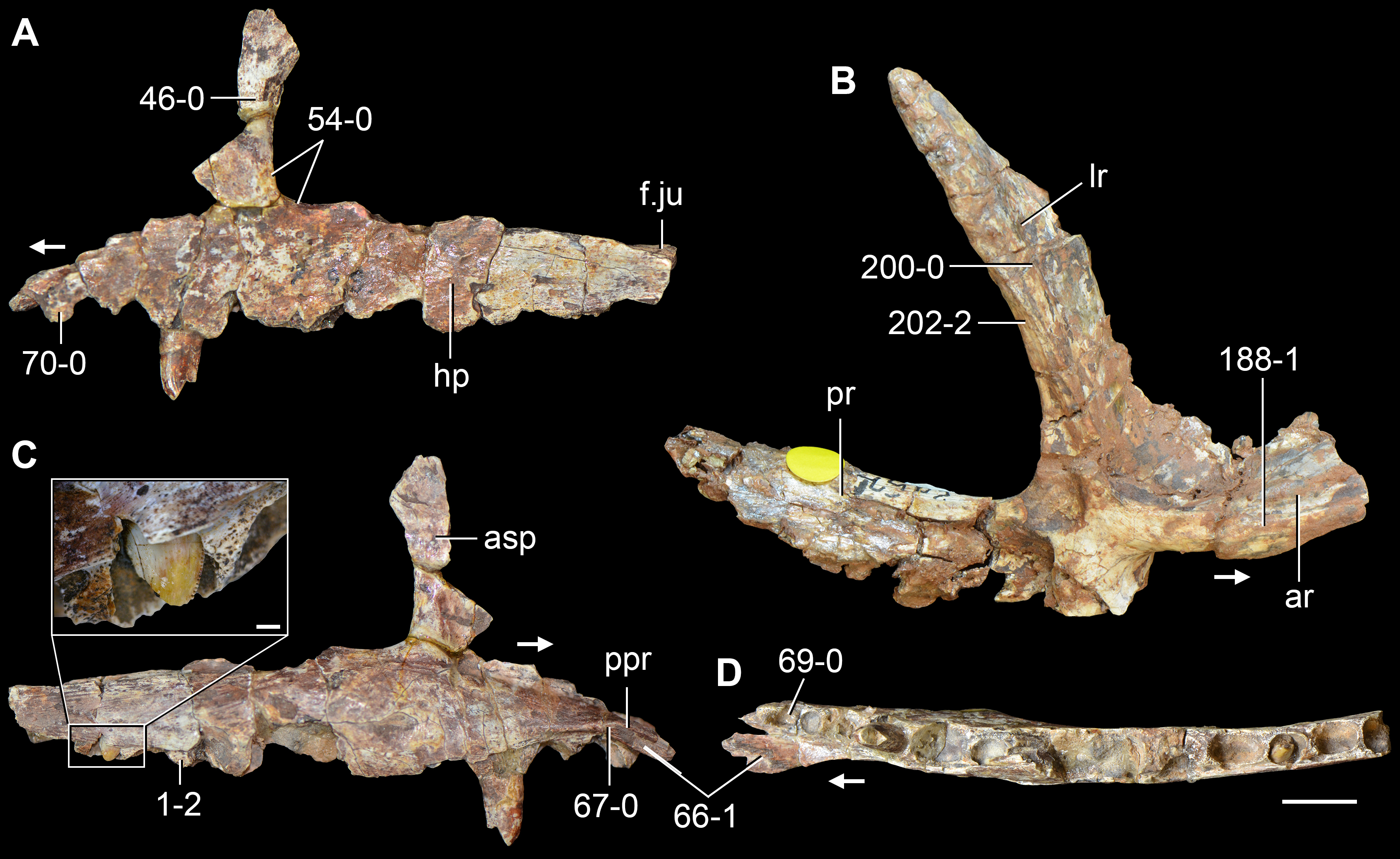
- Holotype maxilla (QM F8998) and referred pterygoid (QM F9521) of Kalisuchus rewanensis

Scientific classification
- Kingdom: Animalia
- Phylum: Chordata
- Class: Reptilia
- Clade: Crocopoda
- Clade: Archosauriformes
- Genus: †Kalisuchus; Thulborn, 1979

Type species
- †K. rewanensis Thulborn, 1979

= Kalisuchus =

Kalisuchus Temporal range: Middle Triassic (Ladinian) ~239 Ma

Extinct genus of reptiles

Kalisuchus ('Kali's crocodile') was a genus of basal archosauriform known from remains unearthed from the Arcadia Formation (Rewan Group) of the Mid–Late Triassic, specifically The Crater locality, southwest of Rolleston, south central Queensland, Australia. It was named after Kali, the Hindu goddess of destruction, a reference to the very fragmentary nature of its remains. The type species of Kalisuchus is K. rewanensis, which refers to the Rewan Group. The Arcadia formation is dated to the Induan age at the very beginning of the Triassic, making Kalisuchus one of the oldest archosauromorphs known in Australia.

== Description ==
The holotype of Kalisuchus is a partial left maxilla, QM F8998. Although many other fragmentary bones from the Arcadia Formation were referred to the genus, the lack of overlap between these bones and the holotype makes these referrals dubious. One of the referred bones, QM F9521, was originally believed to be an unusual jugal but was subsequently interpreted as a right pterygoid similar to that of erythrosuchids and Sarmatosuchus.

The anterior process of the maxilla is very short, similar to that of erythrosuchids. The ascending process is tall and vertical, creating a front edge of the antorbital fenestra which is only gently concave, as opposed to the strongly concave edge in other basal archosauriforms. The ascending process also thins transversely towards the tip. Similar to proterosuchids and Fugusuchus, there is no antorbital fossa separating the antorbital fenestra from the rest of the maxilla. The maxilla as a whole curves outwards very slightly, although to a lesser extent than in Proterosuchus. The lower edge of the medial (inside) surface of the maxilla is convex, while the palatal process is strongly downturned at the front. Although most of the teeth are poorly preserved, those which can be identified are unusually ankylothecodont (placed in deep sockets and fused to the bone), but also compressed, recurved, and serrated on the rear edge and the distal part of the front edge, as in most other carnivorous archosauriforms.

The maxillary morphology of Kalisuchus seems intermediate between the semiaquatic crocodile-like proterosuchids and the robust terrestrial erythrosuchids. The strongly downturned palatal process of the maxilla may have been evidence for a strongly downturned snout, as in proterosuchids, and it may have had a similar niche and biology. Its body length is estimated at 3 meters.

== Classification ==
Thulborn (1979) considered it a proterosuchid closely related to Proterosuchus. However, Ezcurra (2016) found that Proterosuchidae was a mostly paraphyletic group of basal archosauriforms. Although the presence of interdental plates in QM F8998 made Ezcurra consider Kalisuchus to be more advanced than proterosuchids, the large number of tooth sockets (14) preserved in the maxilla forced Kalisuchus to be excluded from the clade containing more advanced archosauriforms, such as the erythrosuchids.
