= 1885 in paleontology =

Paleontology or palaeontology is the study of prehistoric life forms on Earth through the examination of plant and animal fossils. This includes the study of body fossils, tracks (ichnites), burrows, cast-off parts, fossilised feces (coprolites), palynomorphs and chemical residues. Because humans have encountered fossils for millennia, paleontology has a long history both before and after becoming formalized as a science. This article records significant discoveries and events related to paleontology that occurred or were published in the year 1885.

== Archosaurs ==
=== Newly named basal archosauromorphs ===
Name	Novelty	Status	Authors	Age	Unit	Location	Notes	Images
Epicampodon		Junior synonym	Richard Lydekker	Early Triassic			Junior objective synonym of Ankistrodon, a member of Proterosuchidae.	

=== Newly named non-avian dinosaurs ===
Name	Status	Authors	Age	Unit	Location	Notes	Images
Anchisaurus	Valid	Othniel Charles Marsh	Early Jurassic	Portland Formation	US (Connecticut and Massachusetts)	An anchisaurid, a basal member of Anchisauria.	Anchisaurus
Camptosaurus	Valid	Othniel Charles Marsh	Late Jurassic (Kimmeridgian-Tithonian)	Morrison Formation	Romania; England; US (South Dakota and Wyoming)	A camptosaurid; a member of Ankylopollexia.	Camptosaurus
Neosodon	Valid	de la Moussaye	Late Jurassic (Kimmeridgian-Tithonian)	Unnamed unit	France	A possible member of Turiasauria	

== Synapsids ==
Name	Authors	Age	Location	Notes	Images
Cyonasua	Ameghino	5 Million years ago	Argentina; Venezuela	It was one of the first placental mammals that came from North America.	
