= Samsarasuchus =

Samsarasuchus Temporal range: Early Triassic (Induan), 251.9–251.2 Ma

Scientific classification
- Kingdom: Animalia
- Phylum: Chordata
- Class: Reptilia
- Family: †Proterosuchidae
- Subfamily: †Chasmatosuchinae
- Genus: †Samsarasuchus; Ezcurra et al., 2023
- Species: †S. pamelae

Binomial name
- †Samsarasuchus pamelae Ezcurra et al., 2023

Extinct genus of reptiles

Samsarasuchus is an extinct genus of archosauriform reptile from the Early Triassic of India. This genus has one known species, Samsarasuchus pamelae. Samsarasuchus lived a few million years after the Permian-Triassic extinction, the largest known mass extinction event. It was a member of the Proterosuchidae, a group of successful crocodile-like reptiles that survived the extinction event and were among the earliest successful archosauromorphs.

Samsarasuchus is known from several vertebrae recovered from the Panchet Formation of West Bengal, India. The formation has been dated to the Induan, the earliest stage of the Triassic period. It was classified in the Chasmatosuchinae, a subfamily of proterosuchids that contains a majority of genera in the family, including the Permian Archosaurus. It is the only valid proterosuchid from India; Ankistrodon, another proterosuchid previously described from the Panchet Formation, is considered a nomen dubium due to its non-diagnostic remains.

The genus name Samsarasuchus references saṃsāra, the eternal cycle of death and rebirth in Indian religions, referring to the recovery of global ecosystems after the Permian-Triassic extinction event. The species name honors paleontologist Pamela Lamplugh Robinson.
