= Vytshegdosuchus =

Vytshegdosuchus Temporal range: Early Triassic, 248–247.2 Ma

Scientific classification
- Kingdom: Animalia
- Phylum: Chordata
- Class: Reptilia
- Clade: Archosauria
- Clade: Pseudosuchia
- Clade: Paracrocodylomorpha
- Genus: †Vytshegdosuchus; Sennikov, 1988

Type species
- †Vytshegdosuchus zheshartensis Sennikov, 1988

Extinct genus of reptiles

Vytshegdosuchus is an extinct genus of paracrocodylomorph archosaur known from the Early Triassic (latest Olenekian stage) Yarenskian Gorizont of the Komi Republic of the European section of Russia. It contains a single species, Vytshegdosuchus zheshartensis. Vytshegdosuchus was named by Andreii Sennikov in 1988.

== Discovery ==
Vytshegdosuchus is known from the holotype PIN 3361/134, a right ilium, and possibly from the paratype PIN 3361/127, a partial femur. These specimens were collected from the a fossil assemblage called the Parotosuchus fauna of the Upper Yarenskian Gorizont, in the Zheshart locality along the Vychegda River in Aikino district of the Komi Republic. A pterygoid and postcranial material from the Gam locality, a cervical vertebra (PIN 3369/139) from another locality and postcrania from the Mezhog locality were also assigned to Vytshegdosuchus by Sennikov (1999). Nesbitt (2009) argued that the specimens referred to Vytshegdosuchus cannot unambiguously be assigned to that taxon, as these localities are well separated, and the bones were found isolated. Vytshegdosuchus occurs with the erythrosuchian Garjainia and the possible proterosuchian Gamosaurus and demonstrates there was clear temporal overlap with paracrocodylomorph archosaurs and at least erythrosuchians as predicted earlier by phylogenetic analyses. A similar faunal assemblage is present in the Heshanggou Formation of China, which dates to the late Early and possibly early Middle Triassic, as evidenced by the cooccurrence of the basal erythrosuchian Fugusuchus and the poposauroid Xilousuchus.

The holotype of Vytshegdosuchus is also the oldest material currently considered as belonging to Archosauria from Russia, and the only from the Early Triassic. Furthermore, a numerical phylogenetic analysis performed by Nesbitt (2011) placed it in the Paracrocodylomorpha. The Yarenskian Gorizont is generally considered late Olenekian in age on the basis of palynology and the presence of the characteristic Olenekian temnospondyl Parotosuchus. Parotosuchus also occurs in Germany within three formations of the Middle Buntsandstein, and is therefore broadly of Olenekian age and considered an index taxon for these strata. Vytshegdosuchus is from the Gamskian, the upper biochron of the Yarenskian Gorizont and may therefore be latest Olenekian in age and approximately contemporaneous with the poposauroid Ctenosauriscus.

== Description ==
Vytshegdosuchus was originally assigned to the Rauisuchidae based on comparisons with loricatans such as Rauisuchus, Saurosuchus and Arganasuchus. Gower and Sennikov (2000), who revised its diagnosis, focused on the holotype ilium. It preserved a thickened ridge dorsal to the supra-acetabular crest, which according to Nesbitt (2009) is a character only present in many paracrocodylomorphs. Although the anterior process curves medially at its anterior extent according to Sennikov (1988), a character which is not present in these paracrocodylomorphs, an ilium (SAM-PK-11753) from the Anisian-aged Lifua Member of the Manda Formation shows an identical feature. The femur assigned to Vytshegdosuchus is consistent with proterosuchids, Euparkeria and archosaurs since, according to Gower and Sennikov (2000), it has no intertrochanteric fossa and a low fourth trochanter. Furthermore, the femur has a groove on its proximal surface, a character state found in paracrocodylomorphs, as well as some dinosauriforms. The lack of distinct anteromedial tuber of the femur' proximal end is found in nearly all archosaurs ancestrally. Thus, both the ilium and the femur bear features only present in Archosauria, regardless of their association. Therefore, Nesbitt (2009) suggested that Vytshegdosuchus is an archosaur which is assignable to Paracrocodylomorpha.
