= Jaikosuchus =

Jaikosuchus Temporal range: 251.3 –247.2 Ma Early Triassic (Olenekian)

Scientific classification
- Kingdom: Animalia
- Phylum: Chordata
- Class: Reptilia
- Family: †Proterosuchidae
- Subfamily: †Chasmatosuchinae
- Genus: †Jaikosuchus; Sennikov, 1990
- Species: †J. magnus

Binomial name
- †Jaikosuchus magnus (Ochev, 1979)

Synonyms
- Chasmatosuchus magnus Ochev, 1979

Extinct genus of reptiles

Jaikosuchus is an extinct genus of proterosuchid archosauriform. It contains a single species, J. magnus. Fossils have been found from European Russia that date back to the upper Olenekian stage of the Early Triassic.

== Discovery ==
The genus was originally assigned as a new species of the proterosuchid Chasmatosuchus in 1979, but was later put in its own genus in 1990. It has often been described as an erythrosuchid, a rauisuchian or a basal suchian closely related to rauisuchians rather than the more traditional view of it being a more primitive archosaur. In 2016, it was synonymized again with Chasmatosuchus by Ezcurra et al., but was revived as a distinct genus by Ezcurra et al. again in a 2023 overview of proterosuchid taxonomy, who found its vertebral morphology to be distinct from that of Chasmatosuchus. Both were placed in the new subfamily Chasmatosuchinae.
