= Blomosuchus =

Blomosuchus Temporal range: Early Triassic, 250 Ma

Scientific classification
- Kingdom: Animalia
- Phylum: Chordata
- Class: Reptilia
- Clade: Archosauriformes
- Family: †Proterosuchidae
- Genus: †Blomosuchus; Sennikov, 1997

Species
- †B. georgii (Sennikov, 1992 [originally Blomia georgii]) (type)

Extinct genus of reptiles

Blomosuchus is an extinct genus of archosauriform from the Early Triassic of Russia. The type species was named in 1992 as Blomia georgii. However, the name Blomia was preoccupied by a genus of mites in the family Glycyphagidae (Blomia), so the genus was renamed Blomosuchus in 1997. Fossils of Blomosuchus have been found along the Vetluga River besides fossils of another problematic archosauriform, Vonhuenia (both were named in a 1992 study of Triassic fossils from Russia).

The holotype material of Blomosuchus is based on a partially preserved braincase, and upon further examination, it was determined that these bones could not be used to diagnose the species. It is currently considered to be a nomen dubium.
