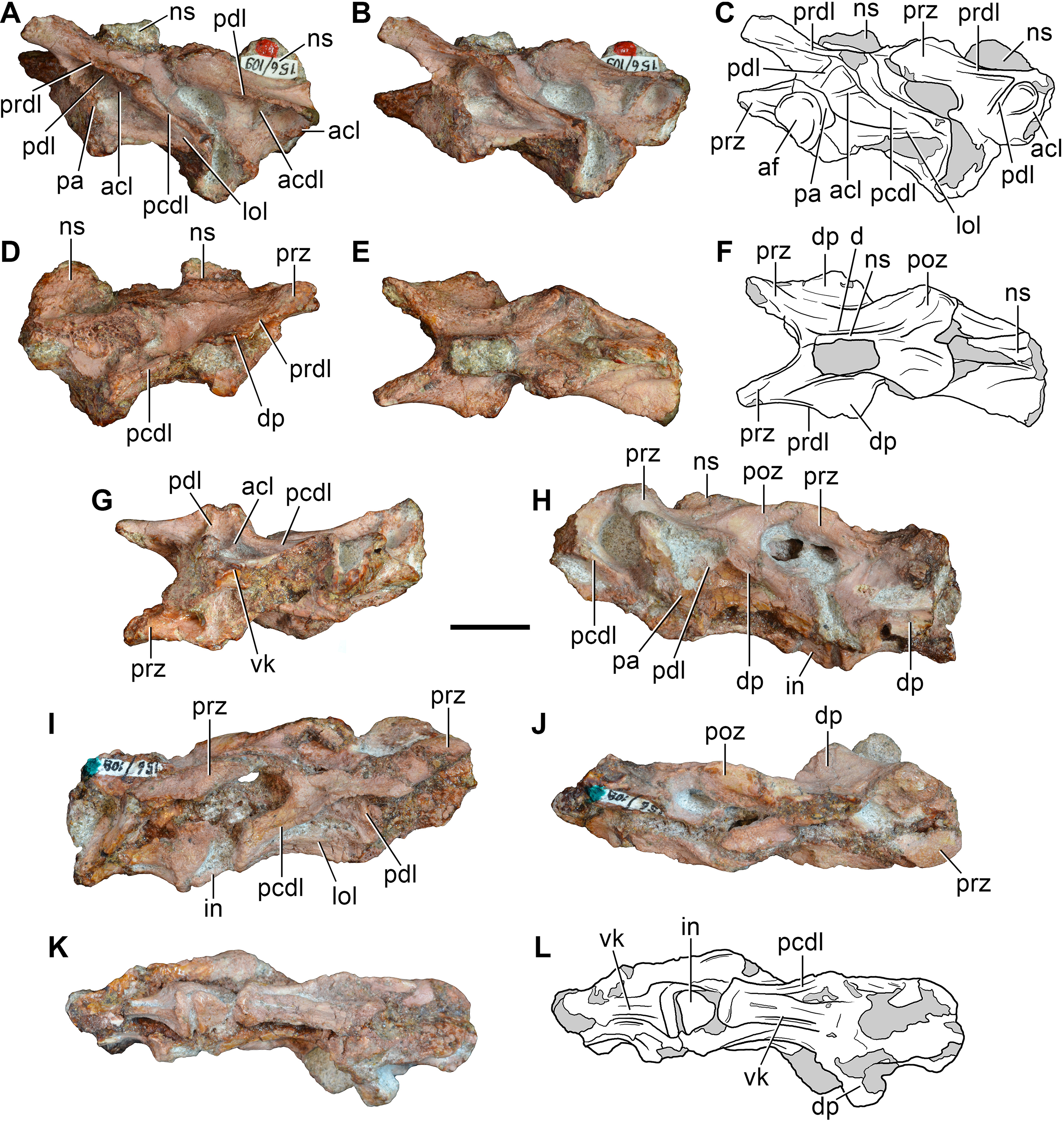
- Cervical vertebrae of specimens PIN 156/108 (H-L) and PIN 156/109 (A-G)

Scientific classification
- Kingdom: Animalia
- Phylum: Chordata
- Class: Reptilia
- Clade: Archosauromorpha
- Genus: †Eorasaurus; Sennikov, 1997

Type species
- †Eorasaurus olsoni Sennikov, 1997

= Eorasaurus =

Eorasaurus Temporal range: Late Permian, 255 Ma

Extinct genus of reptiles

Eorasaurus is an extinct genus of archosauromorph reptile known from the middle late Permian (late Capitanian or early Wuchiapingian age) of Tatarstan, European Russia. It contains a single species, Eorasaurus olsoni. When originally described by Sennikov (1997), Eorasaurus was identified as an early archosauromorph and assigned to the family Protorosauridae, Ezcurra et al. (2014) and Ezcurra (2016) later reclassified Eorasaurus and placed it within the group Archosauriformes. Eorasaurus is based solely on scant fossil material from the neck region, and is thus considered an unstable taxon in phylogenetic analyses. If Eorasaurus is an archosauriform, it would be the oldest known member of the group and would pre-date the previous record holder (the proterosuchid Archosaurus).

== Discovery ==
Eorasaurus was named by Andrey G. Sennikov in 1997. It is known from four specimens representing a single individual, PIN 156/108 through PIN 156/111. These four specimens were discovered in the 1930s near the Volga River in Tatarstan, Russia. They consist of nine vertebrae as well as one dorsal rib and two limb bones. Two cervicals (neck vertebrae), were termed specimen PIN 156/109 and designated as the holotype. Specimen PIN 156/108 represents three cervicals from the base of the neck, PIN 156/110 represents a rib and four dorsals (back vertebrae) near the neck, while PIN 156/111 is a pair of long bones and other fragments possibly from a limb. The material was collected from the Semin Ovrag locality of the upper Severodvinian Horizon (also known as the North Dvina Gorizont) in the Volga River Basin.

== Description ==
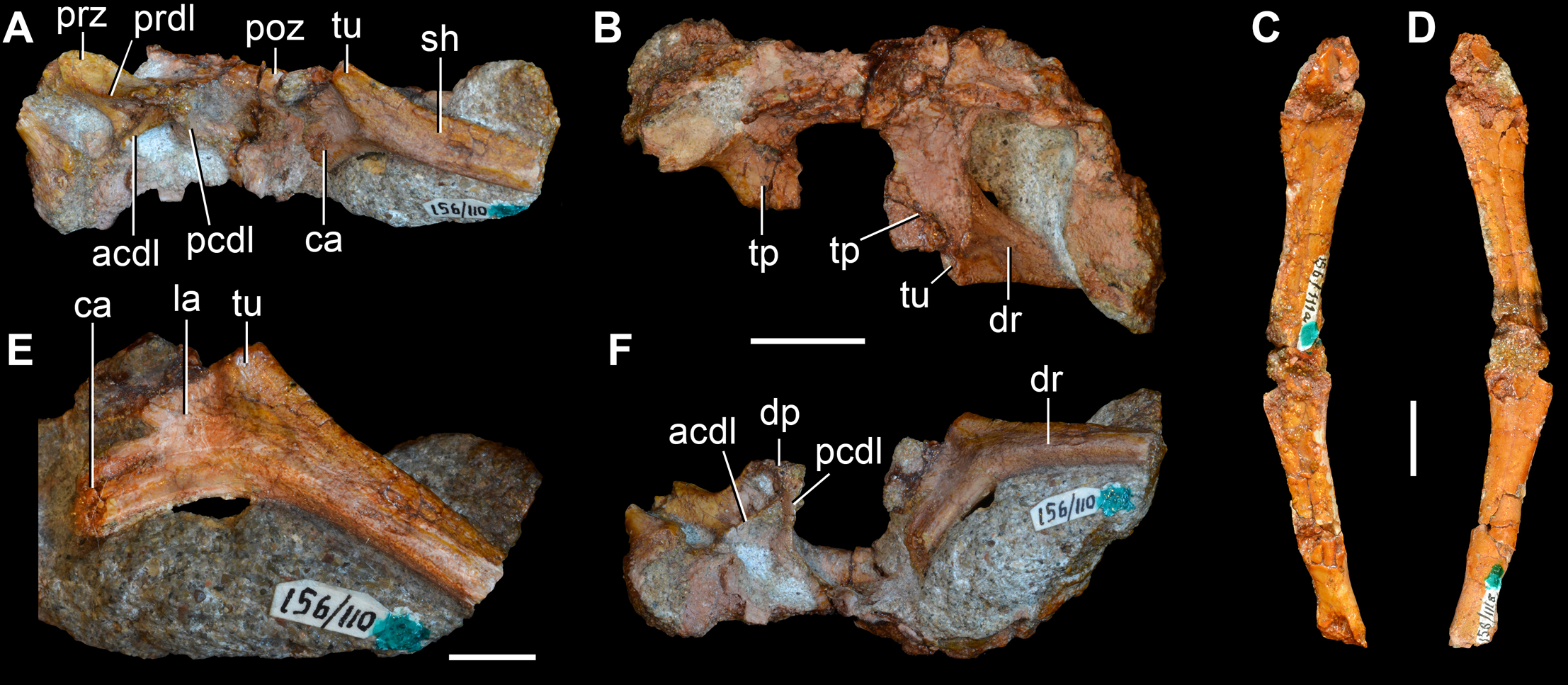
PIN 156/110 (A-B, E-F, Dorsal vertebrae and a rib) and half of PIN 156/111 (C-D, a long bone)

The body or centrum of each of the cervical vertebrae is irregularly shaped with many ridges (laminae) and pits (fossae). Ezcurra et al. (2014) note that Eorasaurus has intercentra, additional wedge-like bones between its cervical vertebrae. This differs from Sennikov's original description, which reported a lack of intercentra. The neural arches of the specimens are fully fused with the centra, indicating that the individual was an adult when it died.

A combination of features in the vertebrae of Eorasaurus distinguish it from other reptiles. The main rib facets (diapophyses) are connected to other parts of the vertebrae via bony ridges called prezygodiapophyseal and centrodiapophyseal laminae. Laminae are characteristic of archosauromorph vertebrae, along with an irregular polygon-like shape of the cervicals. One autapomorphy (unique derived characteristic) of Eorasaurus is the presence of an additional lamina that splits off from the underside of the centrodiapophyseal lamina and crosses the centrodiapophyseal fossa, a deep pit which lies in front of the centrodiapophyseal lamina.

== Classification ==
Based on the structure of its vertebrae, Eorasaurus is almost certainly a member of a clade of reptiles called Archosauromorpha, which includes crocodilians and birds as modern representatives. It is a basal taxon that falls outside crown group Archosauria (the clade defined by the most recent common ancestor of birds and crocodilians). When Eorasaurus olsoni was first described in 1997, Sennikov identified it as a close relative of Protorosaurus speneri, a species of "protorosaur" that lived at around the same time as Eorasaurus (the middle Wuchiapingian) in what is now western Europe. Protorosauria is a group within Archosauromorpha that includes a variety of long-necked Triassic species. Some studies have considered the most basal major clade of archosauromorphs, close to the split between Archosauromorpha and its sister group Lepidosauromorpha, whose modern representatives are lizards and snakes. The monophyly of Protorosauria is debatable, with many studies considering it a grade of early archosauromorphs rather than a natural clade.

However, when Ezcurra et al. (2014) included Eorasaurus olsoni for the first time in a phylogenetic analysis, they found it to be a member of Archosauriformes, a more derived clade within Archosauromorpha. Support for its placement within Archosauriformes was weak, based on a single character (the presence of posterior centrodiapophyseal laminae on cervical vertebrae) that is also present in protorosaurs through evolutionary convergence. If Eorasaurus is an archosauriform rather than a more basal archosauromorph, it would the oldest archosauriform by several million years. The second oldest would be the proterosuchid Archosaurus rossicus, from the latest Permian (Changhsingian) of Poland and Russia. Eorasaurus's position within Archosauriformes would also mean that archosauromorph groups more basal than it (allokotosaurs, rhynchosaurs, prolacertids, proterosuchids, and possibly Euparkeria and erythrosuchids based on Ezcurra et al.'s analysis) originated long before the Permo-Triassic extinction event. This suggests long ghost lineages within these groups, since most fossils from these groups do not appear until well after the extinction.

Eorasaurus was also utilized in Ezcurra (2016)'s phylogenetic analysis. It was one of several unstable "proterosuchian"-grade taxa which formed a polytomy at the base of Archosauriformes. This polytomy was resolved only after the removal of Eorasaurus and its fellow wildcard taxa from the analysis.

Below is a cladogram from Ezcurra et al. (2014) showing their interpretation of Eorasaurus as an archosauriform:

- Diapsida
  - Araeoscelidia
    - Araeoscelis
    - Petrolacosaurus
  - - Coelurosauravus
    - - Younginiformes
        - Acerosodontosaurus
        - Youngina
      - Sauria
        - Lepidosauromorpha
          - Paliguana
          - Rhynchocephalia
            - Gephyrosaurus
            - Planocephalosaurus
          - Squamata
            - Huehuecuetzpalli
            - - Chalarodon
              - Dalinghosaurus
        - Archosauromorpha
          - Protorosauria
            - Protorosauridae
              - Aenigmastropheus
              - Protorosaurus
            - Tanystropheidae
              - Macrocnemus
              - Tanystropheus
          - - Trilophosaurus
            - - Rhynchosauria
                - Howesia
                - Mesosuchus
                - Noteosuchus
              - - Prolacerta
                - Archosauriformes
                  - Proterosuchidae
                    - Archosaurus
                    - Proterosuchus
                  - - Eorasaurus
                    - Erythrosuchus
                    - Euparkeria
