= Vonhuenia =

Vonhuenia Temporal range: Induan, 250 Ma

Scientific classification
- Kingdom: Animalia
- Phylum: Chordata
- Class: Reptilia
- Family: †Proterosuchidae
- Subfamily: †Chasmatosuchinae
- Genus: †Vonhuenia; Sennikov, 1992
- Species: †V. friedrichi

Binomial name
- †Vonhuenia friedrichi Sennikov, 1992

Extinct genus of reptiles

Vonhuenia (named after Friedrich von Huene) is an extinct genus of proterosuchid, a basal archosauriform from the Early Triassic of Russia. Fossils have been found in the Vokhminskaya Formation, along the Vetluga River that are Induan in age, making Vonhuenia one of the earliest archosauriforms.

== Classification ==
The type species V. friedrichi, named in 1992, is based on material that was misassigned to the genus Chasmatosuchus by Ochev (1978). Although originally classified as a proterosuchid, a 2016 cladistic analysis by Ezcurra et al. recovered it as a non-eucrocopodan archosauriform of uncertain position. However, a 2023 cladistic analysis of the Proterosuchidae, again by Ezcurra et al., again recovered Vonhuenia as a proterosuchid, specifically as a basal member of the subfamily Chasmatosuchinae. The earliest known proterosuchid and archosauromorph, Archosaurus, is also placed in Chasmatosuchinae but is thought to be more derived than Vonhuenia, suggesting that the ancestors of Vonhuenia diverged from other chasmatosuchines during the Late Permian.

== Paleobiology ==
Vonhuenia was a small archosauriform that lived alongside amphibians like Tupilakosaurus and Luzocephalus, small reptiles like Phaanthosaurus, and the large-bodied dicynodont Lystrosaurus in the earliest Triassic.
