= Gamosaurus =

Gamosaurus Temporal range: Early Triassic, 248–247.2 Ma

Scientific classification
- Kingdom: Animalia
- Phylum: Chordata
- Class: Reptilia
- Family: †Proterosuchidae
- Subfamily: †Chasmatosuchinae
- Genus: †Gamosaurus; Ochev, 1979
- Species: †G. lozovskii

Binomial name
- †Gamosaurus lozovskii Ochev, 1979

Extinct genus of reptiles

Gamosaurus is an extinct genus of proterosuchid archosauriform. It contains a single species, Gamosaurus lozovskii, named by Vitalii Georgievich Ochev in 1979.

== Discovery and explanation ==
It is known from the Early Triassic (latest Olenekian stage) Yarenskian Gorizont of the European section of Russia. Gamosaurus is known solely from fragmentary material collected from the a fossil assemblage called the Parotosuchus fauna of the Upper Yarenskian Gorizont, in the Gam locality in Aikino district of the Komi Republic. Gamosaurus occurs with the erythrosuchian Garjainia and with material possibly referable to the paracrocodylomorph Vytshegdosuchus.

It was tentatively synonymized with Chasmatosuchus in a 2016 study by Ezcurra et al., but was revived again as a distinct genus by Ezcurra in a 2023 in a taxonomic overview of Proterosuchidae, who found its vertebral morphology to be distinct from that of Chasmatosuchus. Both were placed in the new subfamily Chasmatosuchinae.
