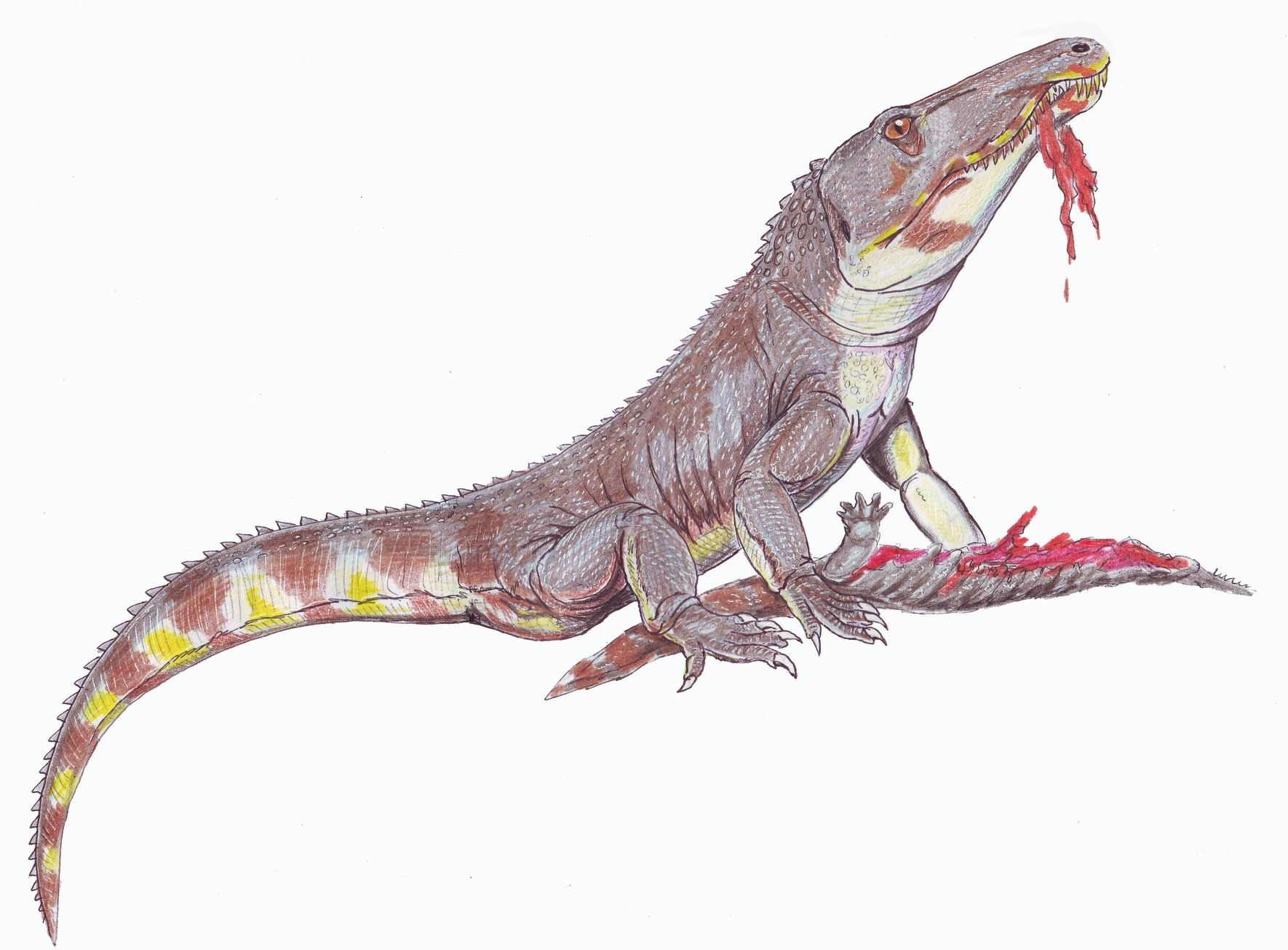
- Life restoration of Chasmatosuchus rossicus

Scientific classification
- Kingdom: Animalia
- Phylum: Chordata
- Class: Reptilia
- Family: †Proterosuchidae
- Subfamily: †Chasmatosuchinae
- Genus: †Chasmatosuchus; Huene, 1940

Species
- †Chasmatosuchus rossicus Huene, 1940 (type); ?†Chasmatosuchus vjushkovi Ochev, 1961

= Chasmatosuchus =

Chasmatosuchus Temporal range: Early Triassic, Olenekian

Extinct genus of reptiles

Chasmatosuchus was an archosauriform reptile from the early Triassic period of European Russia. One of the earliest described archosauriforms, it was over 2 m long and is thought to have behaved like a modern crocodile. Its mouth had two distinct features: the top of its jaw hooked downwards to aid in holding prey, and the upper palate was lined with a row of teeth—a primitive feature lost in later archosaurs.

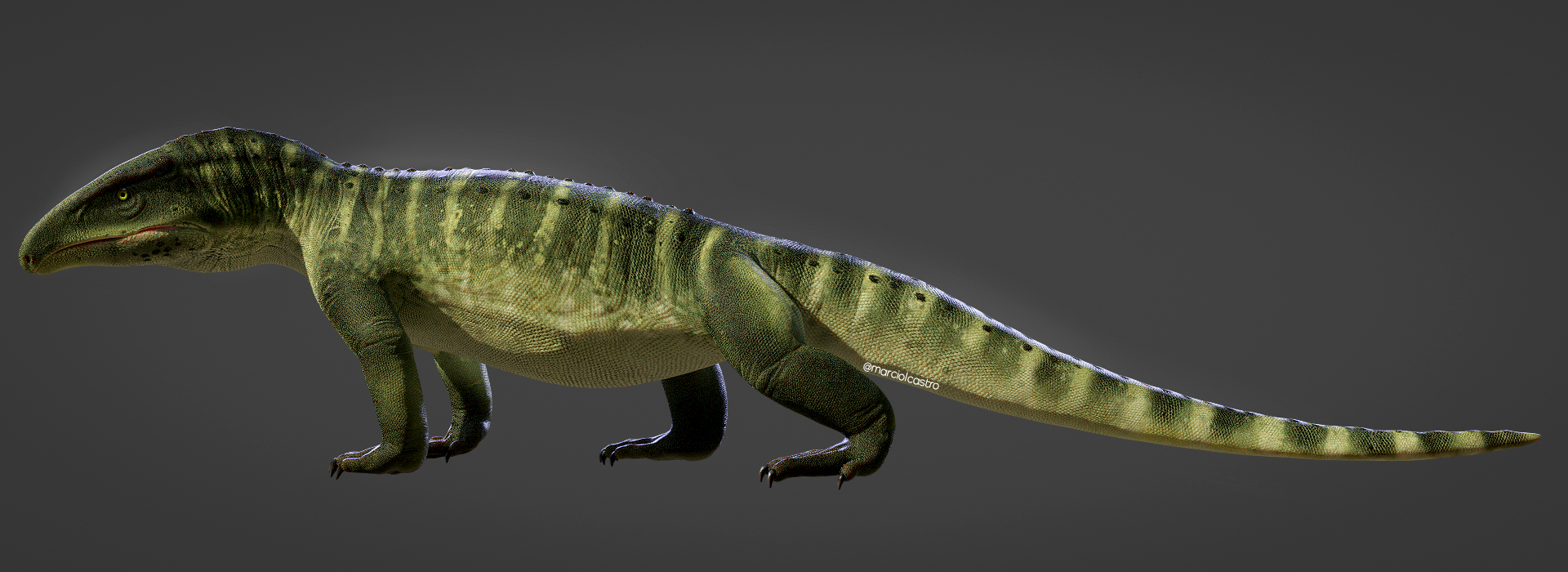
Life reconstruction of Chasmatosuchus.

Chasmatosuchus was formerly assigned to Proterosuchidae, but a 2016 cladistic analysis by Martin Ezcurra could not confidently place the species of Chasmatosuchus within Proterosuchidae. Instead their position was found to be unresolved due to the fragmentary nature of the known material, however Chasmatosuchus is more likely to be intermediate between proterosuchids and erythrosuchids and possibly closely related to Sarmatosuchus otschevi and Cuyosuchus huenei. Ezcurra (2016) could only place C. rossicus and C. magnus within Chasmatosuchus with certainty, while the third valid species "C." vjushkovi potentially does not belong to Chasmatosuchus and may represent a proterosuchid. Gamosaurus and Jaikosuchus were found to be subjective junior synonyms of Chasmatosuchus. However, a 2023 study, also by Ezcurra et al, found Chasmatosuchus to be a true proterosuchid, distinct from Gamosaurus and Jaikosuchus based on vertebral differences, and that all three belonged to a new subfamily of the Proterosuchidae, the Chasmatosuchinae.

Chasmatosuchus parvus, based on an anterior cervical vertebra, was synonymized with Macrocnemus in 1995.
