= Bykovka, Vladimir Oblast =

Bykovka Быковка
- Village
- Location within Vladimir Oblast Location within Russia
- Coordinates: 56°15′N 42°05′E
- Country: Russia
- Region: Vladimir Oblast
- District: Vyaznikovsky District
- Time zone: UTC+3:00

Bykovka (Russian: Быковка) is a rural locality (a village) in Gorod Vyazniki, Vyaznikovsky District, Vladimir Oblast, Russia. The population was 152 as of 2010.

== Geography ==
Bykovka is located 5 km west of Vyazniki (the district's administrative centre) by road. Vyazniki is the nearest rural locality.

== Paleontology ==
Numerous coprolites that possibly belong to therocephalians and proterosuchids were found in the Latest Permian deposits of Bykovka and described in 2016. Specimens contain elongated hollow structures that are interpreted as the remains of hair. This means therapsids were covered in hair as early as 252 million years ago, 80 million years earlier than the oldest owner of fur known before this discovery.
