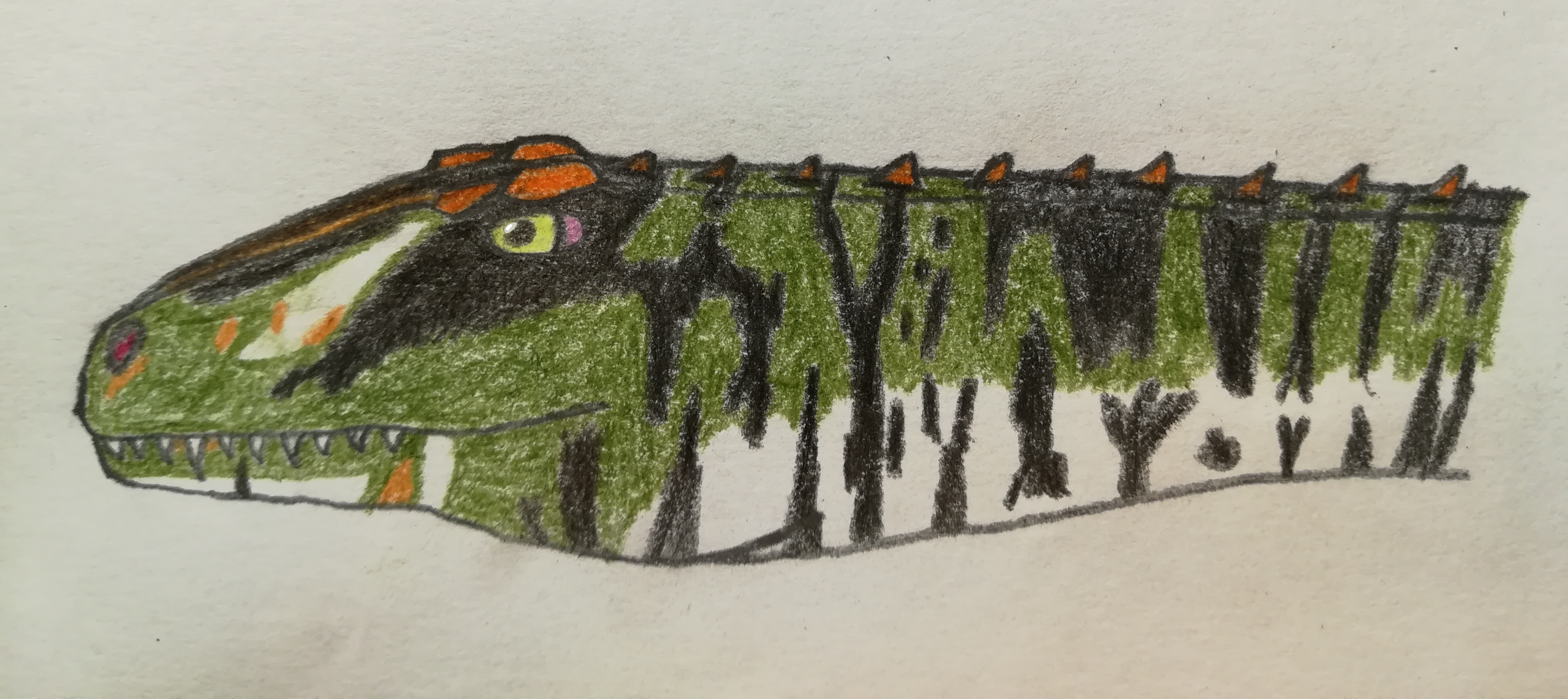
- Restoration of the Collilongus head

Scientific classification
- Kingdom: Animalia
- Phylum: Chordata
- Class: Reptilia
- Clade: Archosauriformes
- Genus: †Collilongus; Borsuk−Białynicka & Sennikov, 2009
- Species: †C. rarus

Binomial name
- †Collilongus rarus Borsuk−Białynicka & Sennikov, 2009

= Collilongus =

Collilongus Temporal range: Early Triassic (Olenekian)

Extinct genus of reptiles

Collilongus (meaning "long neck") is an extinct genus of small archosauriform, possibly a rauisuchian, known from Early Triassic (Olenekian age) rocks of Czatkowice 1, Poland. It was first named by Magdalena Borsuk−Białynicka; and Andriej G. Sennikov in 2009. The type and only known species is Collilongus rarus. It is a rare component of the Czatkowice 1 fauna, known only from vertebrae. Collilongus was a contemporary of the more common archosauriform Osmolskina.
