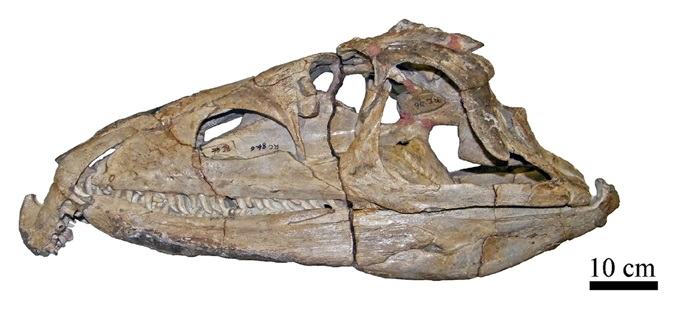
- Skull of P. fergusi

Scientific classification
- Kingdom: Animalia
- Phylum: Chordata
- Class: Reptilia
- Clade: Archosauriformes
- Family: †Proterosuchidae
- Genus: †Proterosuchus; Broom, 1903

Type species
- †Proterosuchus fergusi Broom, 1903

Species
- †Proterosuchus alexanderi (Haughton, 1965); †Proterosuchus fergusi Broom, 1903; †Proterosuchus goweri Ezcurra & Butler, 2015

Synonyms
- Chasmatosaurus Haughton, 1924; Elaphrosuchus Broom, 1946

= Proterosuchus =

Proterosuchus Temporal range: Early Triassic (Induan to Olenekian), 252–250 Ma

Extinct genus of reptiles from the Early Triassic of South Africa

Proterosuchus is an extinct genus of archosauriform reptiles that lived during the Early Triassic. It contains three valid species: the type species P. fergusi and the referred species P. alexanderi and P. goweri. All three species lived in what is now South Africa. The genus was named in 1903 by the South African paleontologist Robert Broom. The genus Chasmatosaurus is a junior synonym of Proterosuchus.

Proterosuchus was a mid-sized quadrupedal reptile with a sprawling stance that could reach a length of up to 3.5 meters (11 ft). It had a large head and distinctively hooked snout. It was a predator, which may have hunted prey such as Lystrosaurus. The lifestyle of Proterosuchus remains debated; it may have been terrestrial or it may have been a semiaquatic ambush predator similar to modern crocodiles.

Proterosuchus is one of the earliest members of the clade Archosauriformes, which also includes crocodilians, pterosaurs, and dinosaurs, including birds. It lived in the aftermath of the Permian–Triassic extinction event, the largest known mass extinction in the timeline of Earth's history.

== Description ==
Size of P. fergusi compared to a human

Proterosuchus was a quadrupedal reptile with a sprawling stance. It could reach a total length of up to 3.5 meters (11 ft). Proterosuchus fergusi is the largest known proterosuchid with a skull length of 47.7 cm (18.8 in) and a possible body length of 3.5–4 m (11–13 ft). Like most reptiles, Proterosuchus had scaly skin.

Proterosuchus had a proportionally large head and long neck compared to its body. The most distinctive characteristic of its head was its strongly hooked snout, formed by a downturned premaxilla. The premaxilla contained up to nine teeth in adults, and the teeth in the snout tip were splayed out to the sides. The jaws of Proterosuchus contained numerous teeth, with up to 9 premaxillary, 31 maxillary, and 28 dentary teeth in each side. The teeth of Proterosuchus were recurved, labiolingually compressed, and serrated, as in most archosauriforms. They were isodont, or all equal in size and shape, in adult individuals, but in juveniles, the teeth were less strongly curved in the back of the jaw.

The skull of Proterosuchus exhibits many features characteristic of its position as a basal archosauriform. It bears a prominent antorbital fenestra, like most archosauriforms. In some specimens, the jugal and quadratojugal contact to complete the ventral margin of the lower temporal fenestra, as in other archosauriforms, but in other specimens, there is a narrow gap between the bones so that the lower temporal bar is incomplete as in non-archosauriform archosauromorphs. The lower jaw bears a small external mandibular fenestra, another characteristic of archosauriforms and their closest relatives.

== Classification ==
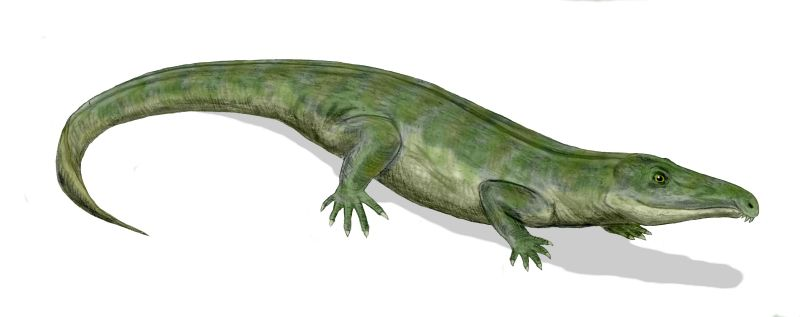
Life reconstruction of P. fergusi

- Allokotosauria
- - Rhynchosauria
  - - Boreopricea
    - - Kadimakara
      - Prolacerta
    - - Teyujagua
      - - Tasmaniosaurus
        - Archosauriformes
          - - Archosaurus
            - Proterosuchus
          - - Sarmatosuchus
            - - Cuyosuchus
              - - Erythrosuchidae
                - Eucrocopoda (includes Archosauria)

Phylogenetic position of Proterosuchus within Crocopoda

Proterosuchus is an early member of Archosauriformes, which also contains crocodilians, pterosaurs, and dinosaurs, including birds. It is the type genus of Proterosuchidae, which also contains the genus Archosaurus. Proterosuchidae is, by definition, the most basal clade of archosauriforms, as Archosauriformes is defined based on their phylogenetic position. Under pre-cladistic taxonomy, Proterosuchus was classified in the order Thecodontia and suborder Proterosuchia. Both taxa are now recognized as paraphyletic groups of basal archosauriforms.

Ezcurra et al. (2023) recovered Proterosuchus as the most basal member of the family Proterosuchidae, and the only definitive proterosuchid to not be a member of the subfamily Chasmatosuchinae. As Chasmatosuchinae contains the Permian Archosaurus, this would suggest that the ancestor of Proterosuchus diverged from other proterosuchids during the Permian.

=== Species ===
==== Valid species ====
Proterosuchus currently contains three valid species, all from the Lower Triassic of South Africa.

- Proterosuchus fergusi is the type species of Proterosuchus. It was named in 1903 by Robert Broom based on a specimen from Tarkastad donated by John Fergus, for whom the species was named. It is known from several specimens, and the species Chasmatosaurus vanhoepeni and Elaphrosuchus rubidgei are junior synonyms of it. The holotype is poorly preserved and indeterminate, and a neotype has been suggested. It is distinguished from other species of Proterosuchus by its more strongly curved quadrate.
- Proterosuchus alexanderi was named by A. Hoffmann in 1965 based on a subadult specimen. It is currently only known from one specimen. It is distinguished from other species of Proterosuchus by its longer snout.
- Proterosuchus goweri was named by Martín D. Ezcurra and Richard J. Butler in 2015, based on a specimen that had originally been described as a specimen of Chasmatosaurus vanhoepeni. It is currently only known from one specimen. It is distinguished from other species of Proterosuchus by a deep horizontal process of the maxilla, a sinusoidal ventral margin of the maxilla, and a gap in the tooth row between the premaxilla and maxilla.

==== Other species ====
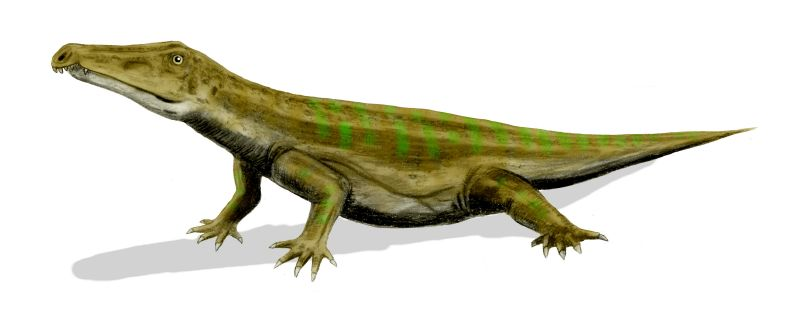
Life reconstruction of "Chasmatosaurus" yuani

Several species have been assigned to Proterosuchus or its junior synonym Chasmatosaurus in the past that are either no longer valid or no longer assigned to Proterosuchus.

- Ankistrodon indicus was named in 1865 by Thomas Henry Huxley, based on a specimen from the Induan-age Panchet Formation of India. Ankistrodon has been regarded as a synonym of Proterosuchus or Chasmatosaurus in the past, but if this synonymy were correct, Ankistrodon would have priority over the other names. It is now considered a nomen dubium.
- Chasmatosaurus vanhoepeni is the type species of Chasmatosaurus. It was named in 1924 by Haughton. The species name honors E. C. N. van Hoepen, who collected and prepared the holotype. It is now considered a junior synonym of Proterosuchus fergusi. Like all P. fergusi specimens, it is from the Lystrosaurus Assemblage Zone of the Beaufort Group of South Africa.
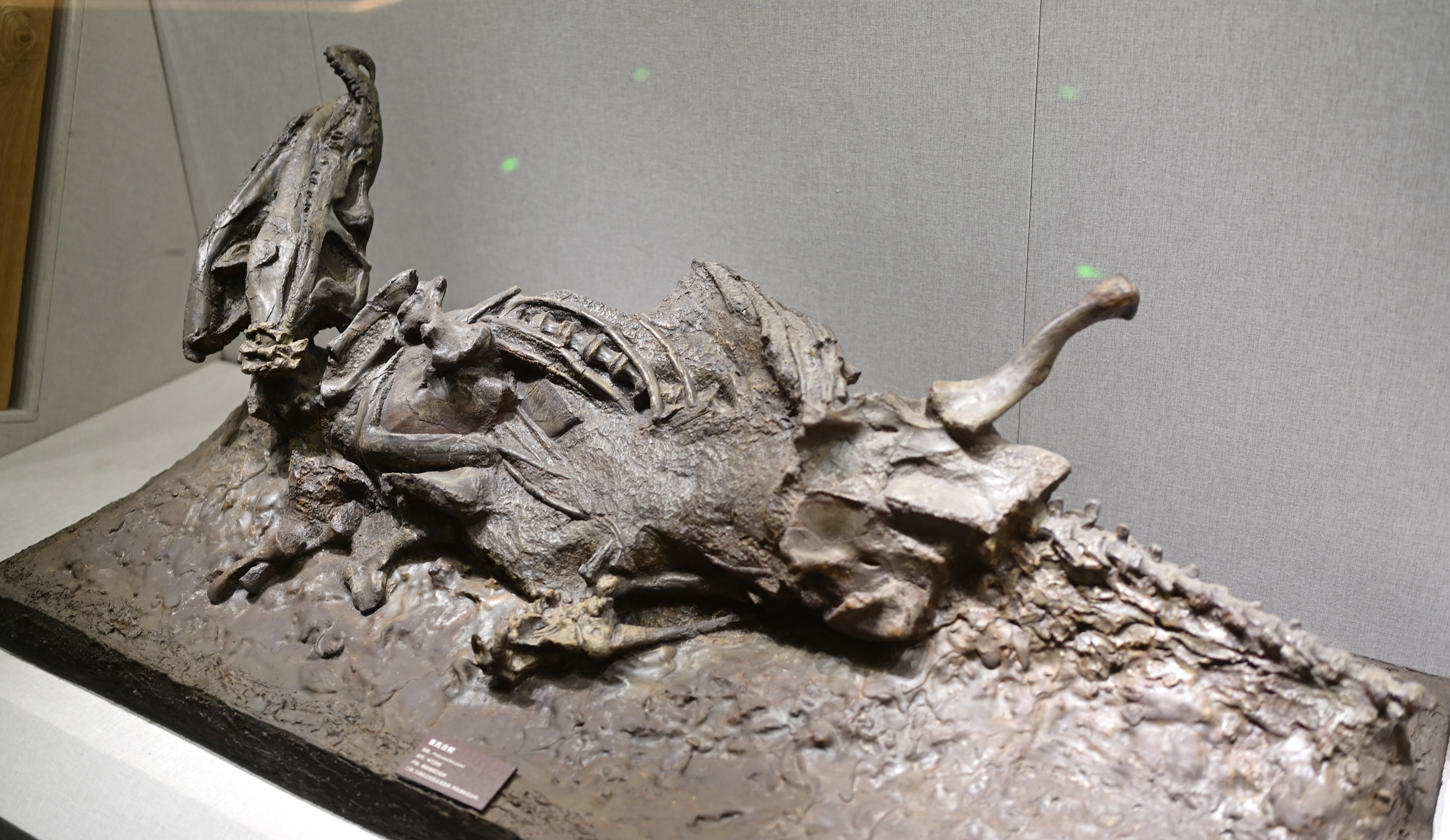
- Skeletal cast of "Chasmatosaurus" yuani, Baoding Natural History Museum
  Chasmatosaurus yuani was named by C. C. Young in 1936, based on specimens from the Induan-age Jiucaiyuan Formation of China. It is considered a valid species of proterosuchid, but is not formally assigned to Proterosuchus. It is considered to be in need of taxonomic revision. It is more closely related to Proterosuchus goweri than to other species of Proterosuchus.
- Elaphrosuchus rubidgei was named by Robert Broom in 1946. It is now considered a junior synonym of Proterosuchus fergusi, with the holotype being a juvenile specimen thereof. Like all P. fergusi specimens, it is from the Lystrosaurus Assemblage Zone of the Beaufort Group of South Africa.
- Chasmatosaurus ultimus was named by C. C. Young in 1964, based on a specimen from the Anisian-age Ermaying Formation of China. It was long believed to be the geologically youngest species of proterosuchid, as it would be the only one from the Middle Triassic. However, it is no longer considered to be a proterosuchid and is now considered to be a suchian archosaur. It is now considered a nomen dubium.

== Palaeobiology ==
=== Potential semiaquatic habits ===
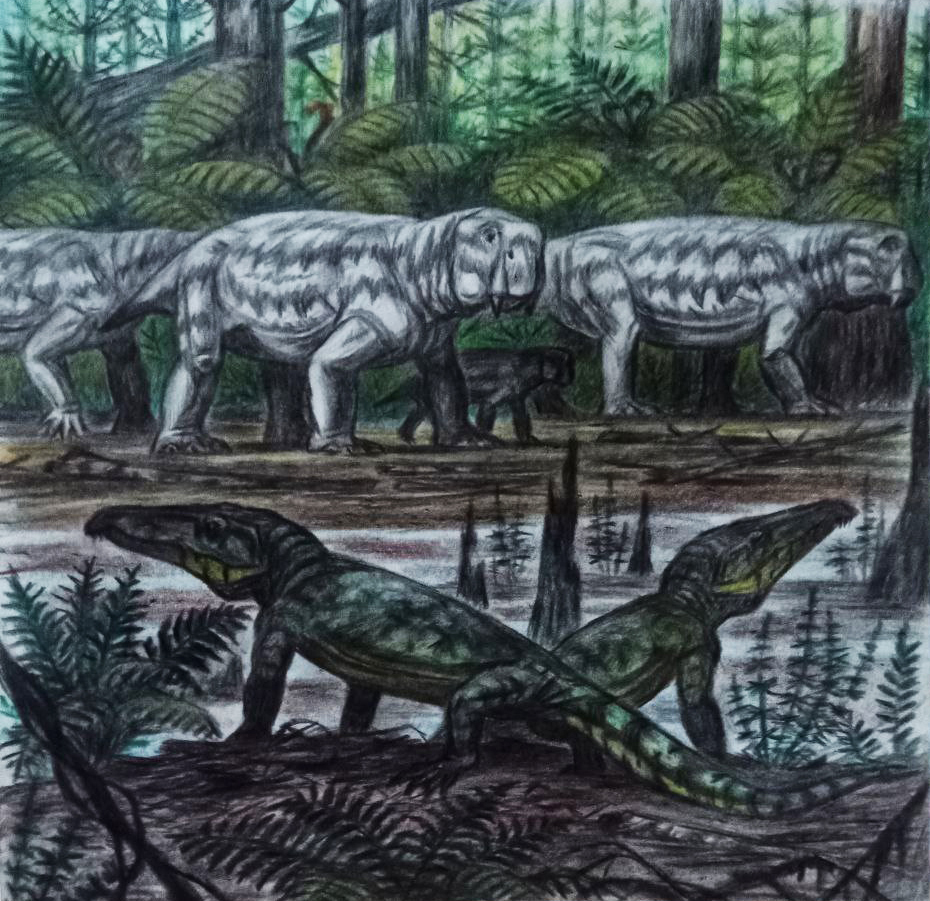
Restoration of Lystrosaurus and P. fergusi

The lifestyle of Proterosuchus is debated. It has conventionally been depicted as a semiaquatic ambush predator, similar in ecology to modern crocodiles. Conversely, it lived in an arid environment and many aspects of its anatomy conflict with a semiaquatic lifestyle. In particular, its limbs are well-ossified, as in terrestrial animals, and the nostrils are laterally-positioned on the snout, not dorsally-positioned. The histology of its bones is reminiscent of terrestrial animals, not semiaquatic ones.

Conversely, other anatomical features resemble semiaquatic predators such as crocodiles more closely than terrestrial reptiles. The orientation of its ear canals suggests a neutral head posture with the snout angled upward, which would have raised the nostrils high enough for the animal to breathe while largely submerged. The utility of the orientation of the semicircular canal in determining head posture and habitat preference has been challenged. Proterosuchus was a predator, but the specifics of its diet are not known. It has been suggested to have eaten fish or the abundant contemporary dicynodont Lystrosaurus.

=== Snout function ===
The function of the hooked snout in Proterosuchus is not fully known. The most likely use was in sexual or social signaling, similar to the hooked snout (kype) of male salmon. As the snout does not appear to have been sexually dimorphic, it may be an example of mutual sexual selection, where both males and females prefer mates with long hooked snouts. The snout may have been used in a specialized method of predation, as it exhibits high resistance to dorsoventral (up-down) bending. It is unclear what kind of hunting strategy would have suited the skull shape. The premaxillary teeth do not show wear facets and did not occlude with the teeth of the lower jaw, indicating that they were not used in any abrasive activities and could not have been used to grip prey. The snout tip did not have the pressure receptors present in crocodilians and Spinosaurus.

=== Senses ===
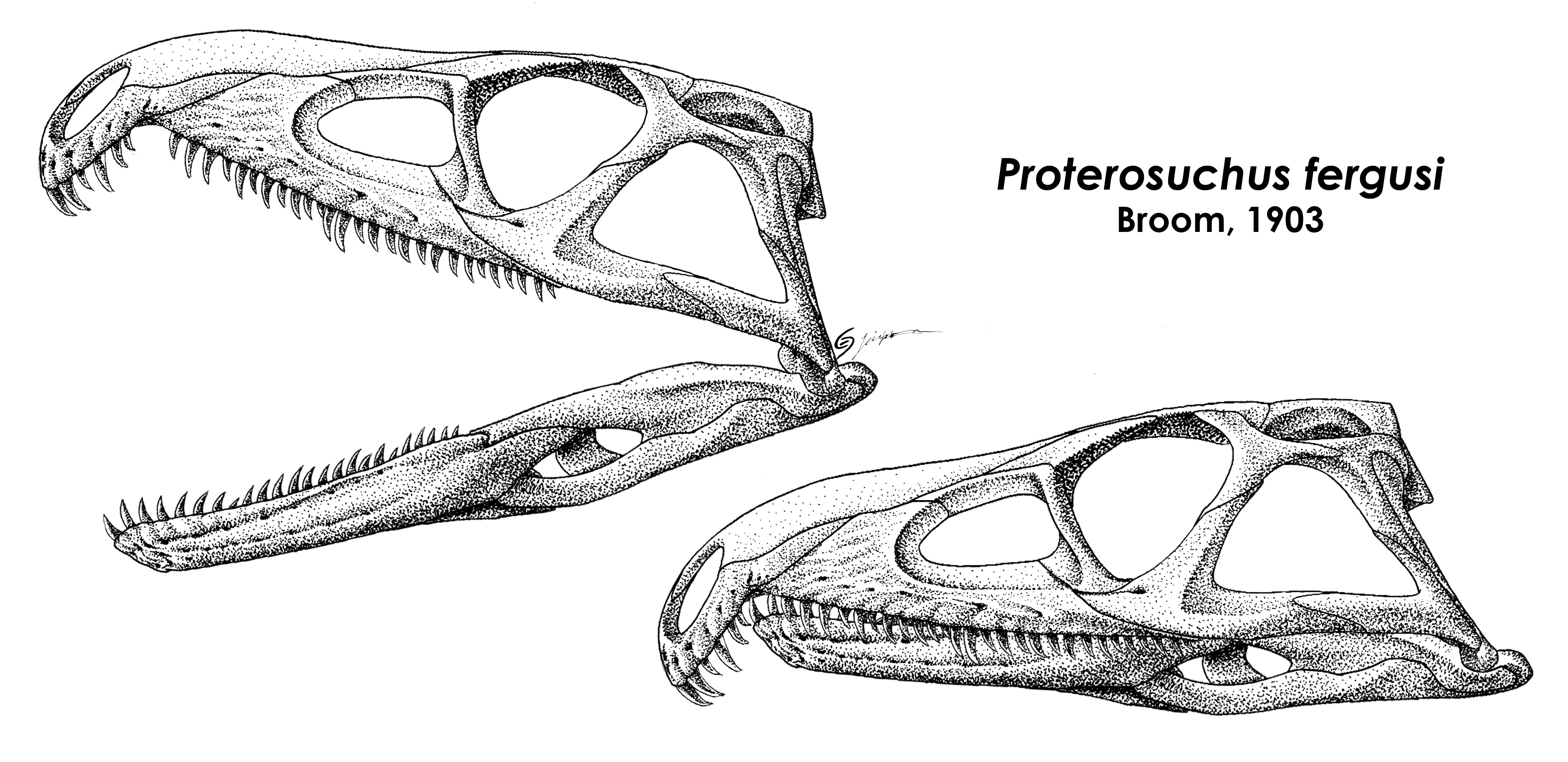
P. fergusi skull diagram

As inferred from the proportions of its scleral rings (eye bones), Proterosuchus had mesopic vision, indicating that it was adapted to see well in both bright and dim light. Mesopic vision is characteristic of cathemeral animals, which are active in both night and day, and crepuscular animals, which are active in twilight. Adaptations to see in dim light may have been ancestral to archosaurs, and Proterosuchus may have been an early example of this trend. Proterosuchus lived near the Antarctic Circle, so its mesopic vision may have instead been an adaptation to the highly seasonal day lengths it experienced.

The hearing of Proterosuchus was likely adapted for lower frequencies, as in modern crocodiles. Due to its low-sensitivity hearing, Proterosuchus probably did not rely heavily on vocal communication and may have been relatively solitary. Based on the size of its olfactory bulbs, Proterosuchus had a strong sense of smell, similar to that of modern crocodiles. However, its olfactory bulbs were not as large as those of its relative Tasmaniosaurus, suggesting different habits and potentially a more aquatic ecology in Proterosuchus.

=== Metabolism ===
The metabolism of Proterosuchus is disputed. Like other crocopod archosauromorphs, Proterosuchus had a higher metabolic rate than extant ectotherms. Furthermore, Proterosuchus possessed fibrolamellar bone, indicative of a high growth rate and corresponding high metabolism. However, studies conflict on whether the metabolism of Proterosuchus was within the range of extant endotherms. Its metabolic rate was lower than most other crocopods, except for the ectothermic phytosaurs and crocodilians, which may have been an adaptation to a crocodile-like predatory strategy.

=== Ontogeny ===
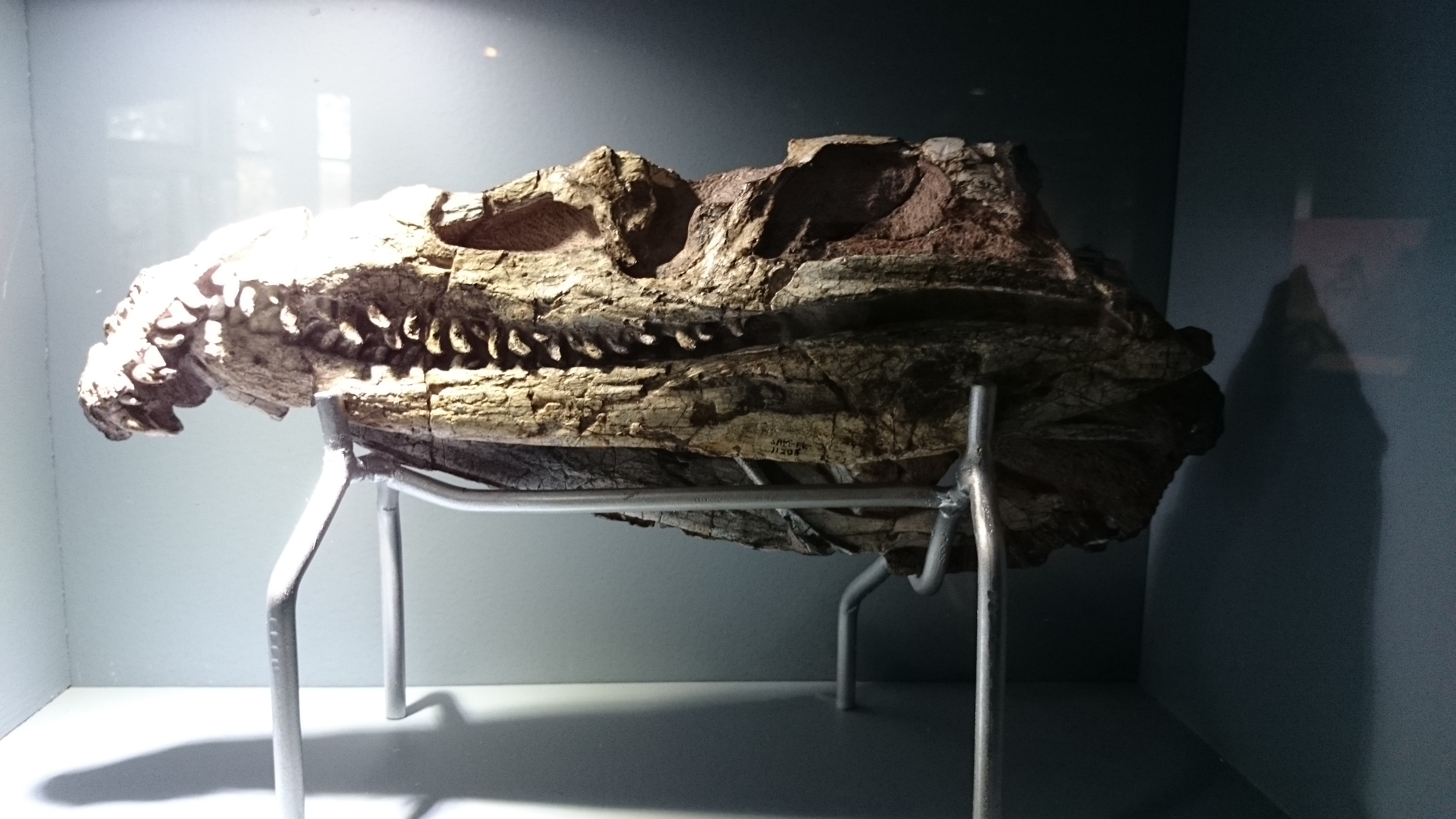
Skull in Iziko South African Museum

Proterosuchus grew quickly. It probably reached sexual maturity within a year, at roughly two-thirds of its maximum adult body size. Rapid growth rates were typical of Early Triassic archosauromorphs, and may have been an adaptation to surviving the hostile environment of the Early Triassic. Juvenile Proterosuchus may have hunted different prey from adults.

== Palaeoecology ==
Proterosuchus fossils are found in the Lystrosaurus Assemblage Zone of the Beaufort Group in South Africa. Proterosuchus was the first new species to arrive in the Karoo environment after the Permian–Triassic extinction. Proterosuchus and the therocephalian Moschorhinus were the largest carnivores in the ecosystem at the time, likely an apex predator, and soon after the extinction Moschorhinus declined and went extinct while Proterosuchus thrived. The most common tetrapod in Proterosuchus's environment was the herbivorous dicynodont Lystrosaurus. The environment was hot, semi-arid and experienced droughts.
