= Barberenasuchus =

Barberenasuchus Temporal range: Middle Triassic ~242.0–235.0 Ma

Scientific classification
- Kingdom: Animalia
- Phylum: Chordata
- Class: Reptilia
- Clade: Archosauriformes
- Genus: †Barberenasuchus; Mattar, 1987

Type species
- Barberenasuchus brasiliensis Mattar, 1987

Extinct genus of reptiles

Barberenasuchus is an extinct genus of an archosauriform. Fossils (poorly preserved skull and axis vertebra) have been found from the Santa Maria Formation of southern Brazil of Late Triassic age. Its phylogenetic position within Archosauriformes is uncertain; the author of its description classified it as a sphenosuchid crocodylomorph, while Kischlat (2000) considered it to be a rauisuchian. Irmis, Nesbitt and Sues (2013) stated that they "could not find any crocodylomorph character states preserved in the holotype specimen". Based on the presence of an antorbital fenestra the authors assigned Barberenasuchus to Archosauriformes, but stated that without further preparation and study it is not possible to assign it to any specific archosauriform group. It is named in honor of Mário Costa Barberena.
