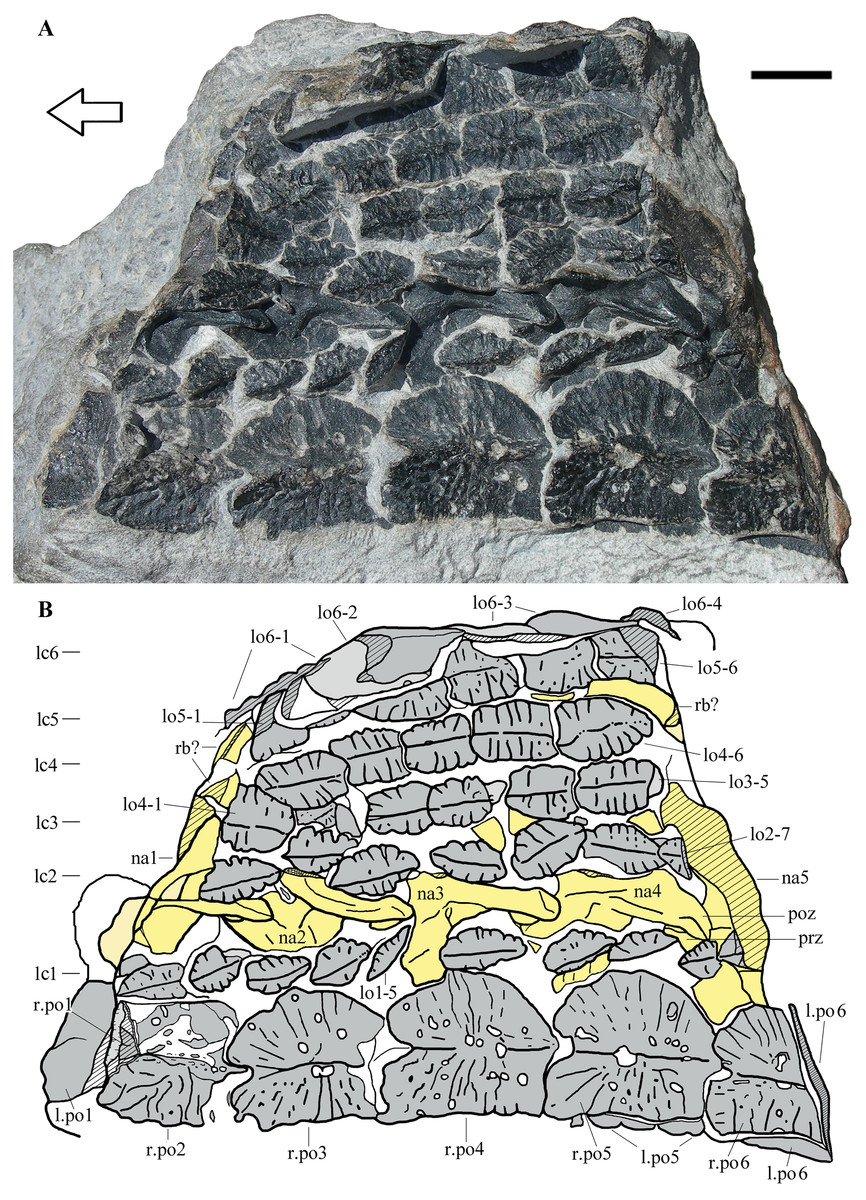
- Holotype

Scientific classification
- Kingdom: Animalia
- Phylum: Chordata
- Class: Reptilia
- Clade: Eucrocopoda
- Genus: †Heteropelta; Dalla Vecchia, 2021

Type species
- †Heteropelta boboi Dalla Vecchia, 2021

= Heteropelta =

Heteropelta Temporal range: Middle Triassic, Anisian

Extinct genus of reptiles

Heteropelta is an extinct genus of archosauriform, possibly a basal archosauriform, basal phytosaur or a suchian archosaur. It is known from a single species, Heteropelta boboi, which was found in the Middle Triassic Torbiditi d'Aupa Formation in Italy. The holotype is listed as specimen MFSN 46485 and was collected after 2006.
