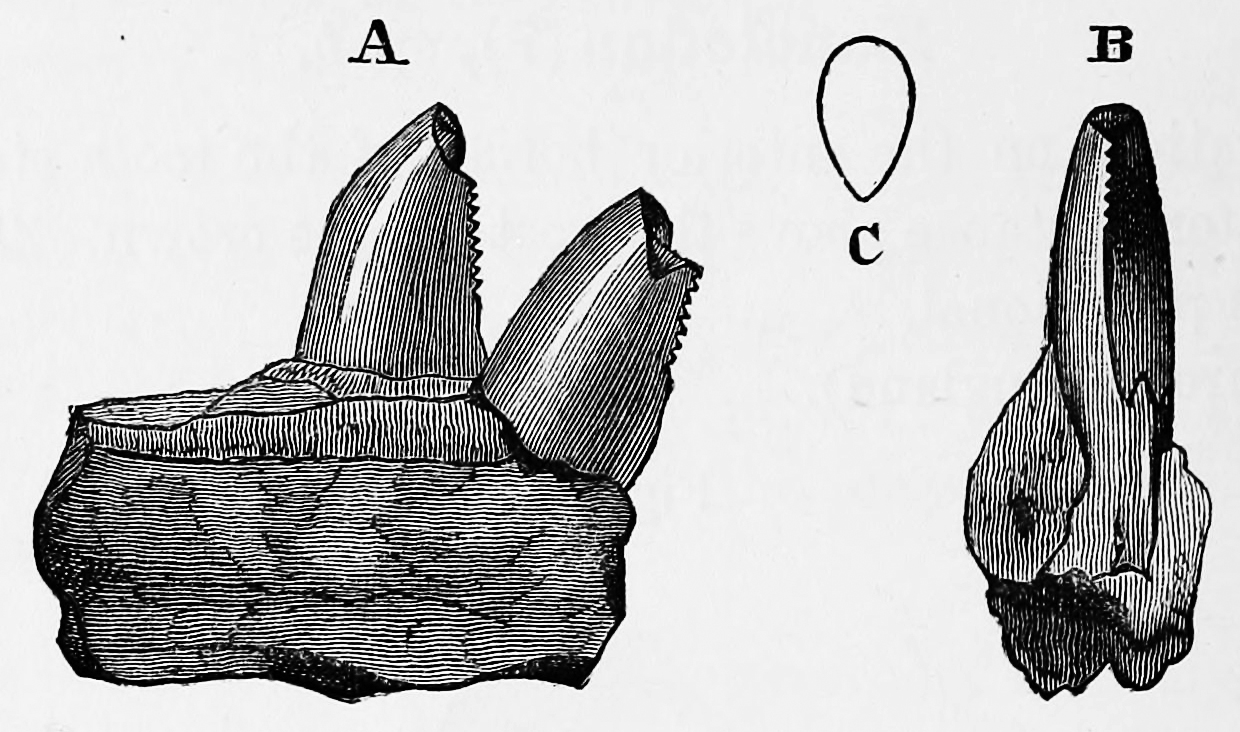
- Holotype in (A) lateral and (B) posterior views, with (C) a cross section of a tooth

Scientific classification
- Kingdom: Animalia
- Phylum: Chordata
- Class: Reptilia
- Family: †Proterosuchidae
- Genus: †Ankistrodon; Huxley, 1865

Type species
- †Ankistrodon indicus Huxley, 1865

Synonyms
- Epicampodon Lydekker, 1885; Epicampodon indicus (Huxley, 1865) Lydekker, 1885; Thecodontosaurus indicus (Huxley, 1865) Huene, 1908; Chasmatosaurus indicus (Huxley, 1865) Huene, 1942

= Ankistrodon =

Ankistrodon Temporal range: Early Triassic, 251.9–247.2 Ma

Extinct genus of reptiles

Ankistrodon is an extinct genus of archosauriform known from the Early Triassic Panchet Formation of India. First thought to be a theropod dinosaur, it was later determined to be a proterosuchid. The type species is A. indicus, described by prolific British zoologist Thomas Henry Huxley in 1865. One authority in the 1970s classified Ankistrodon as a senior synonym of Proterosuchus. Ezcurra (2023) found Ankistrodon to be a nomen dubium, as the teeth are indistinguishable from those of Proterosuchus. A second Indian proterosuchid from the same formation, Samsarasuchus, was also described in the same study, making it the only known valid proterosuchid from India.
