= Cuyosuchus =

Cuyosuchus Temporal range: Late Triassic ~235.0–205.6 Ma

Scientific classification
- Domain: Eukaryota
- Kingdom: Animalia
- Phylum: Chordata
- Class: Reptilia
- Clade: Archosauromorpha
- Clade: Crocopoda
- Clade: Archosauriformes
- Genus: †Cuyosuchus; Reig 1961

Type species
- †Cuyosuchus huenei Reig 1961

Extinct genus of reptiles

Cuyosuchus is an extinct genus of archosauriform reptile. Its fossils have been found in Late Triassic-aged rocks of the Cacheuta Formation, Cuyo Basin, Mendoza, Argentina. Cuyosuchus is based on MCNAM 2669, a partial postcranial skeleton including 26 vertebrae from all parts of the spinal column, ribs, partial pectoral girdles, part of the pelvis, upper arms and part of the lower arms, the left thigh bone and shin, pitted armor scutes, and fragments. It was described in 1961 by Osvaldo Reig and named after the Cuyo Basin; the type species is C. huenei, referring to German paleontologist Friedrich von Huene. Although originally described as a proterosuchid, restudy by Julia Desojo and colleagues in 2003 found that it could not be assigned to any family.
