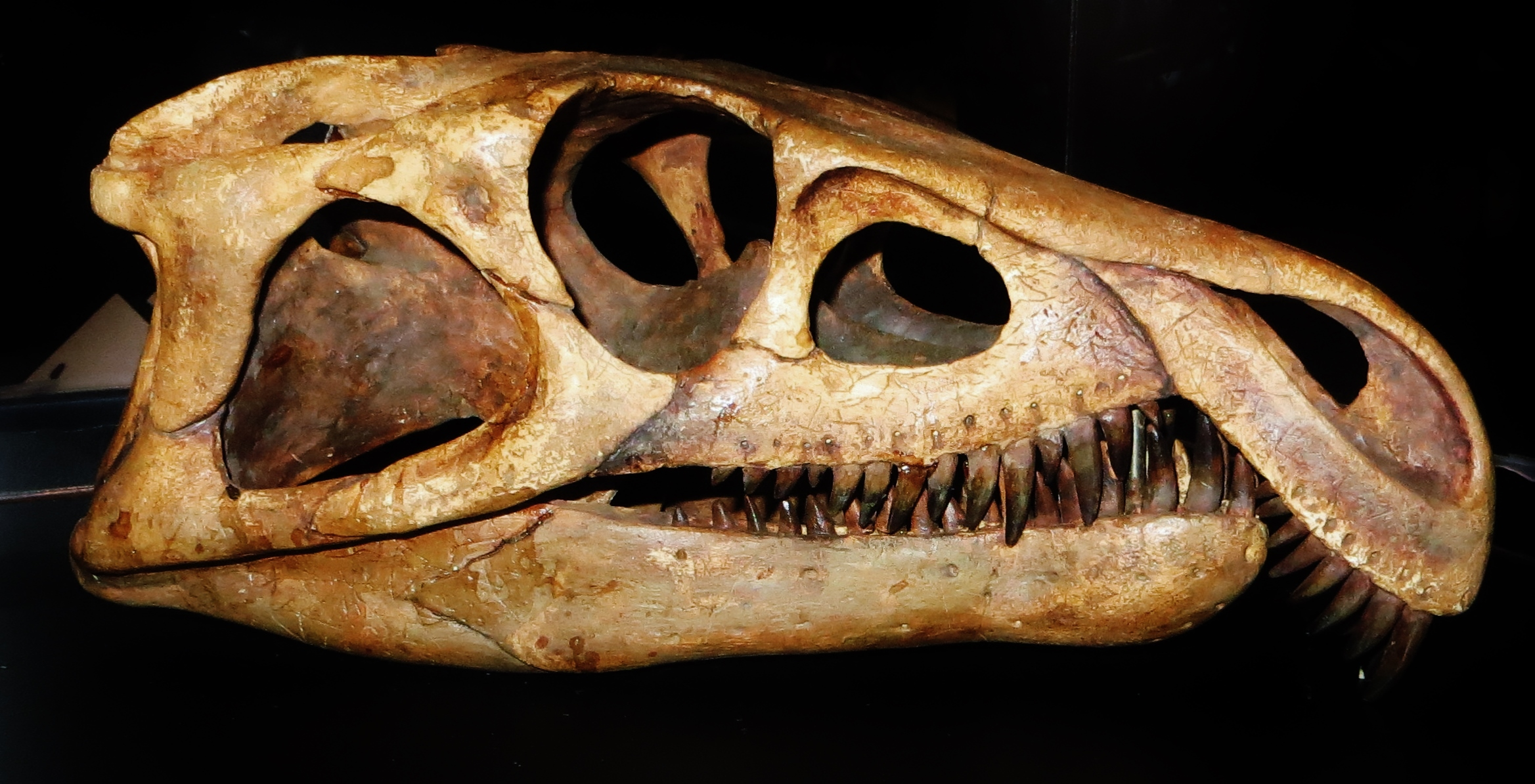
- Restored skull of Archosaurus

Scientific classification
- Kingdom: Animalia
- Phylum: Chordata
- Class: Reptilia
- Clade: Archosauriformes
- Family: †Proterosuchidae; Huene, 1914

Genera
- Proterosuchus; ?Koilamasuchus; ?Sarmatosuchus; ?Blomosuchus; ?Ankistrodon; Chasmatosuchinae; Vonhuenia; Jaikosuchus; Gamosaurus; Chasmatosuchus; Tsylmosuchus; Samsarasuchus; Archosaurus

Synonyms
- Proterosuchinae Huene, 1914; Chasmatosauridae Haughton, 1924; Chasmatosaurinae Haughton, 1924; Pelycosimiidae Abel, 1919

= Proterosuchidae =

Proterosuchids Temporal range: Latest Permian to Latest Early Triassic, 252–247 Ma Possible Middle Triassic records

Extinct family of reptiles

Proterosuchidae is an early family of basal archosauriforms whose fossils are known from the Late Permian and the Early Triassic. The highest diversity of genera is known from European Russia, but fossils are also known from South Africa, India, China, Australia, Brazil and possibly Argentina. The name comes from Greek πρότερο- ("first") and σοῦχος ("crocodile").

== Description ==
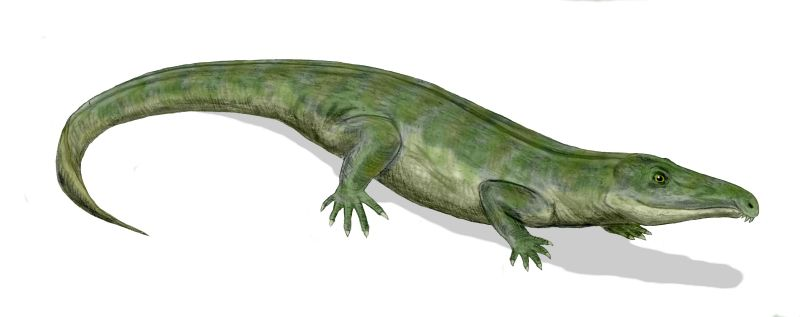
Proterosuchus fergusi from the Early Triassic of South Africa

They were slender, medium-sized (about 1.5 m (4 ft 11 in) long, largest specimens reached 3.5–4 m (11–13 ft)), long-snouted and superficially crocodile-like animals, although they lacked the armoured scutes of true crocodiles, and their skeletal features are much more primitive. The limbs are short and indicate a sprawling posture, like contemporary lizards but unlike most later archosaurs.

Their most characteristic feature is a distinct down-turning of the premaxilla (the front of the upper jaw, which overhangs the lower jaw).

== Evolutionary history ==
The terminal Permian catastrophe, which killed off 95% of all types of life, cleared the world of all large therapsids and allowed the proterosuchids to become the top predators. Within the space of five million years the proterosuchids had evolved to fill a wide variety of terrestrial and semi-aquatic niches. The proterosuchids represent perhaps the earliest adaptive radiation of the archosaurs. They gave rise to the Erythrosuchidae some time in the Early Triassic.

A 2023 study recovered a majority of proterosuchids outside of Proterosuchus and Sarmatosuchus as belonging to a distinct subfamily, the Chasmatosuchinae, defined as "the most inclusive clade containing Chasmatosuchus rossicus, but not Proterosuchus fergusi, "Chasmatosaurus" yuani, Proterosuchus alexanderi, Proterosuchus goweri, Erythrosuchus africanus". Chasmatosuchinae contains many Triassic proterosuchids in addition to the only Permian proterosuchid, Archosaurus; this would suggest that an initial taxonomic diversification of the Proterosuchidae (including an initial taxonomic divergence between Proterosuchus and chasmatosuchines) had already occurred in the Permian.

== Classification ==
=== Phylogeny ===
Recent studies consider Proterosuchidae to be at least a partially paraphyletic grouping, meaning that it does not form a true clade with a single common ancestor and proterosuchids as its only descendants. Instead, they are a chain of successively basal archosauriforms. Proterosuchidae sensu stricto is defined as "all taxa more closely related to Proterosuchus fergusi than to Erythrosuchus africanus, Crocodylus niloticus (the Nile crocodile), or Passer domesticus (the house sparrow). Below is a cladogram from Ezcurra (2016), that reexamined all historical members of the "Proterosuchia" (a polyphyletic historical group including proterosuchids and erythrosuchids). The placement of fragmentary taxa that had to be removed to increase tree resolution are indicated by dashed lines (in the most derived position that they can be confidently assigned to). Taxa that are nomina dubia are indicated by the note "dubium". Bold terminal taxa are collapsed. Ezcurra (2016) recovered a monophyletic Proterosuchidae containing only Archosaurus and the species of Proterosuchus, however some species (e.g. Chasmatosuchus spp, Vonhuenia friedrichi) are too fragmentary to resolve whether they also fall into Proterosuchidae. Tasmaniosaurus, Fugusuchus, Sarmatosuchus, Cuyosuchus and the "Long Reef proterosuchid" (SAM P41754) on the other hand were recovered confidently outside of Proterosuchidae.

- - Prolacertidae
  - - SAM-PK-591
    - "Ankistrodon indicus" (dubium)
    - "Blomosuchus georgii" (dubium)
    - Tasmaniosaurus triassicus
    - Archosauriformes
      - Chasmatosuchus
        - Chasmatosuchus magnus
        - Chasmatosuchus rossicus
        - Gamosaurus lozovskii
      - Chasmatosuchus vjushkovi
      - Vonhuenia friedrichi
      - Proterosuchidae
        - Archosaurus rossicus
        - Proterosuchus fergusi
        - - Proterosuchus alexanderi
          - - Proterosuchus goweri
            - Proterosuchus yuani
      - - Eorasaurus olsoni
        - Kalisuchus rewanensis
        - Fugusuchus hejiapanensis
        - - Sarmatosuchus otschevi
          - - Cuyosuchus huenei
            - - Erythrosuchidae
                - SAM P41754
                - Uralosaurus magnus
                - Guchengosuchus shiguaiensis
                - other erythrosuchids
              - Eucrocopoda

The following phylogeny for the Proterosuchidae sensu stricto was recovered by Ezcurra et al (2023):

- Proterosuchidae
  - - Proterosuchus
    - "Chasmatosaurus" yuani
    - Chasmatosuchinae
      - Vonhuenia
      - - Jaikosuchus
        - Gamosaurus
        - Chasmatosuchus
        - Tsylmosuchus
        - Samsarasuchus
        - Archosaurus

=== Genera ===
Genus	Status	Age	Location	Description	Images
Ankistrodon	nomen dubium	Early Triassic	India		
Archosaurus	Valid	Late Permian, Changhsingian	Russia		
Blomosuchus	nomen dubium	Early Triassic, Induan	Russia		
Chasmatosuchus	Valid	Early Triassic	Russia		
Gamosaurus	Valid	Early Triassic	Russia		
Jaikosuchus	Valid	Early Triassic	Russia		
Koilamasuchus	Disputed	Middle - Late Triassic	Argentina		
Proterosuchus	Valid	Early Triassic	South Africa		
Samsarasuchus	Valid	Early Triassic	India		
Sarmatosuchus	Disputed	Early Triassic	Russia		
Tsylmosuchus	Valid	Early Triassic	Russia		
Vonhuenia	Valid	Early Triassic, Induan	Russia		
