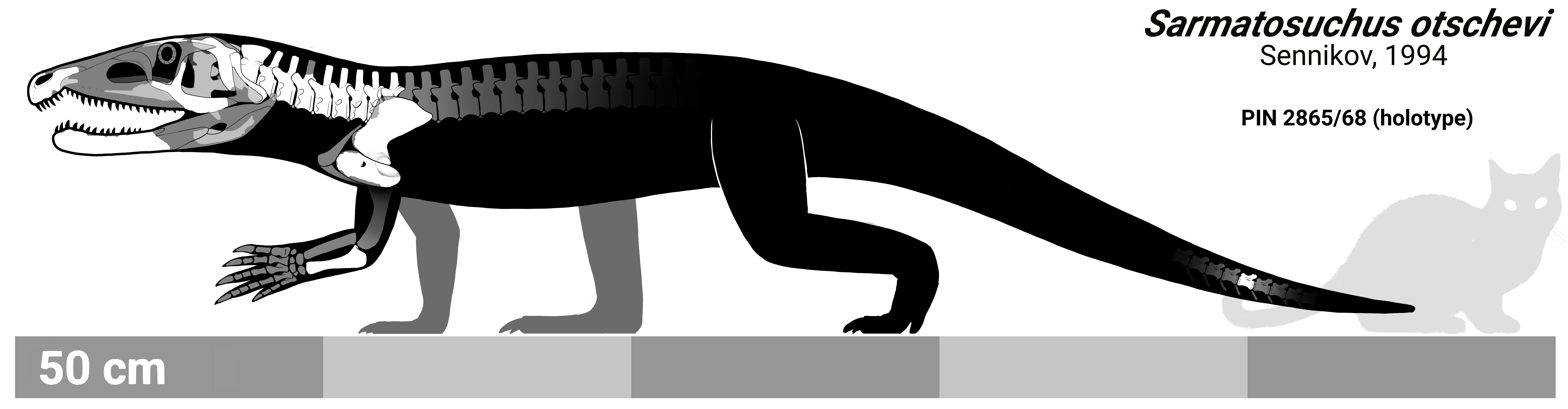
- Skeletal reconstruction of the holotype
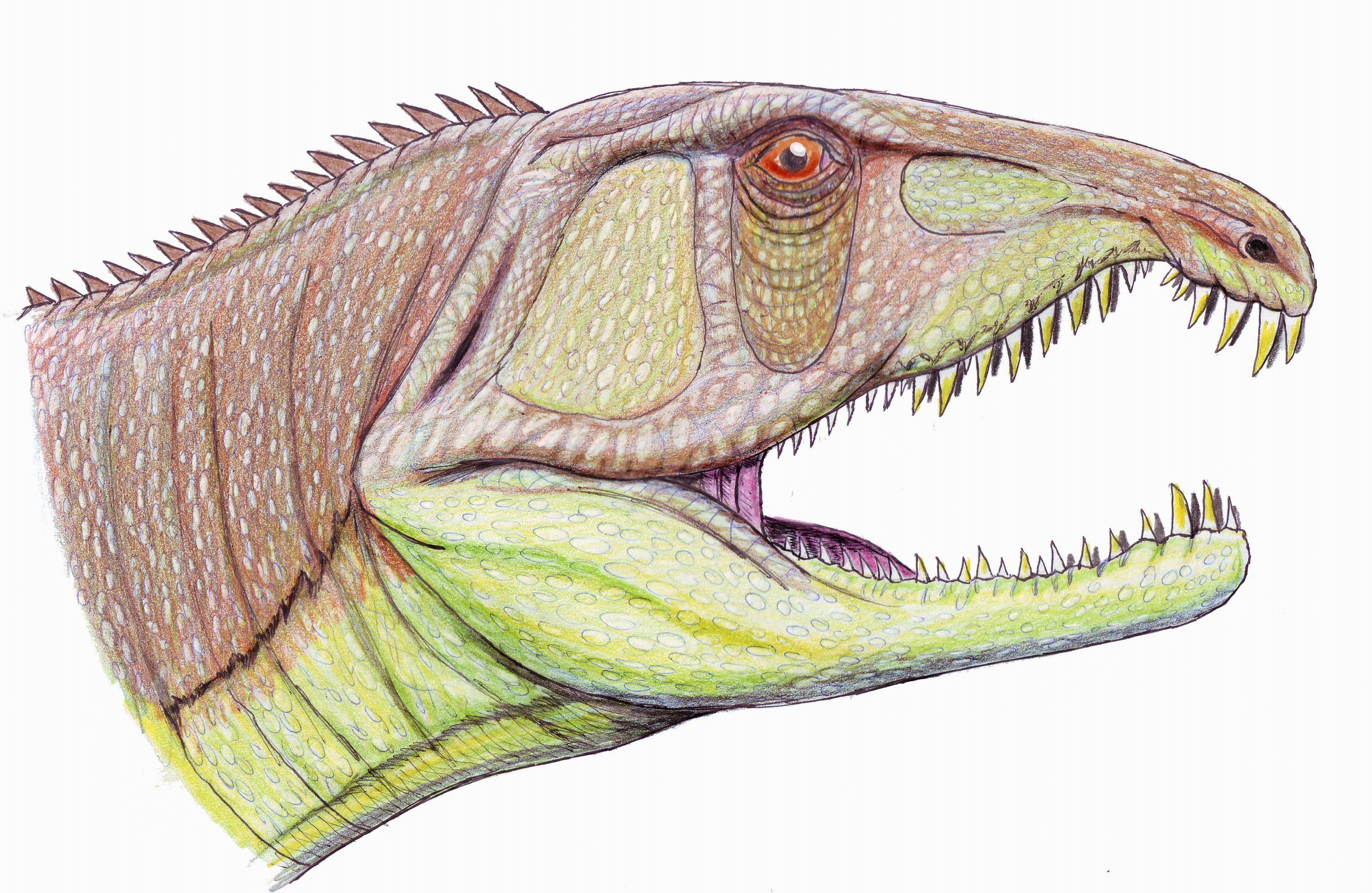
- Reconstruction of Sarmatosuchus

Scientific classification
- Kingdom: Animalia
- Phylum: Chordata
- Class: Reptilia
- Clade: Archosauriformes
- Genus: †Sarmatosuchus; Sennikov, 1994

Type species
- †Sarmatosuchus otschevi Sennikov, 1994

= Sarmatosuchus =

Sarmatosuchus Temporal range: Anisian, 247–245 Ma

Extinct genus of reptiles

Sarmatosuchus is an extinct genus of archosauriform reptile found in sediments of Middle Triassic age and known from the single species Sarmatosuchus otschevi. It is one of the earliest stem-archosaur species known. The holotype and only specimen was found in lithified river deposits of the Donguz Formation exposed near the Berdyanka River, Orenburg region, Russia. The genus was originally included in the extinct family Proterosuchidae. However, later analysis by David Gower and Andrei Sennikov, the describing author, has removed it from the Proterosuchidae and designated it a basal archosauriform.
