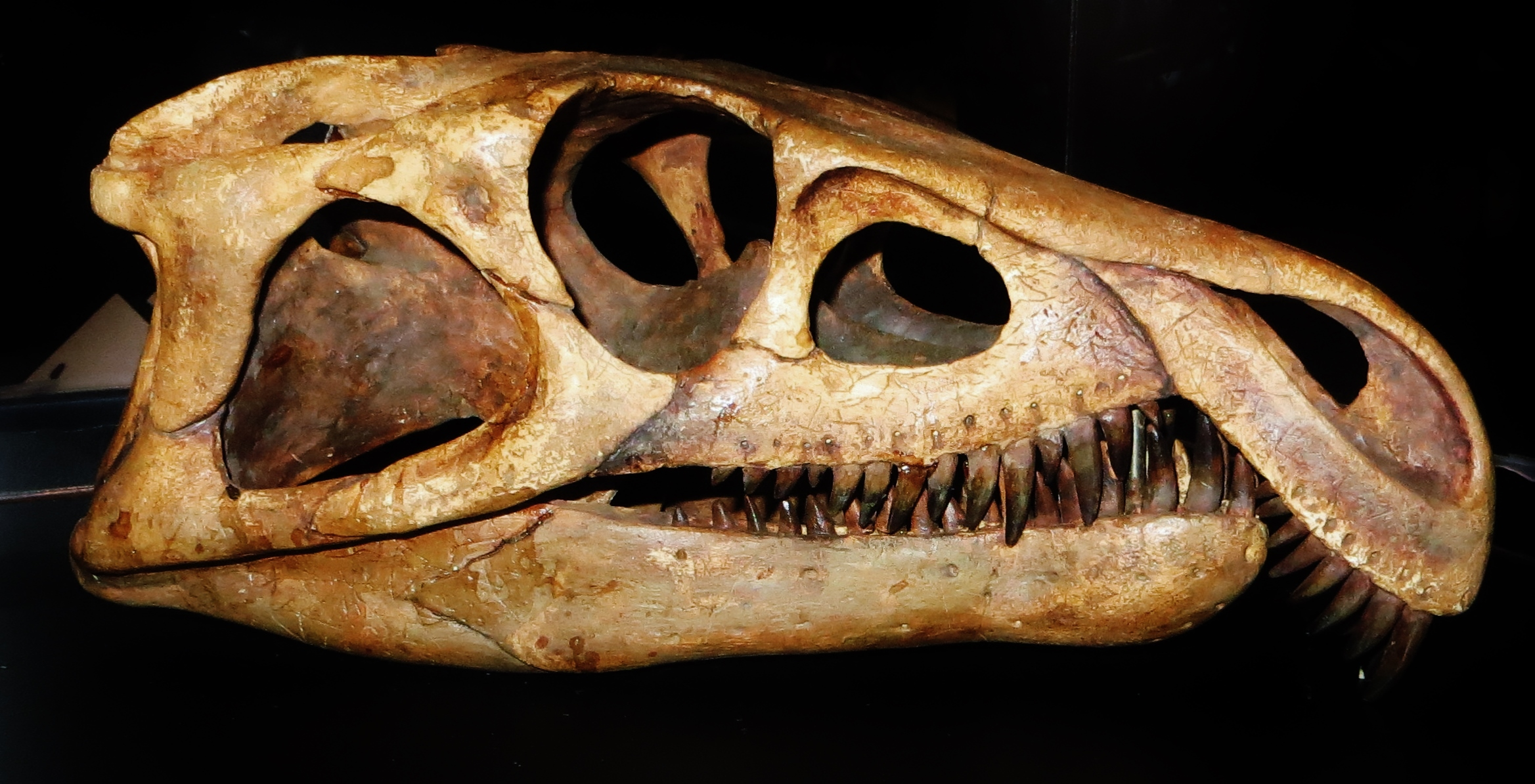
- Restored skull

Scientific classification
- Kingdom: Animalia
- Phylum: Chordata
- Class: Reptilia
- Family: †Proterosuchidae
- Subfamily: †Chasmatosuchinae
- Genus: †Archosaurus; Tatarinov, 1960
- Species: †A. rossicus

Binomial name
- †Archosaurus rossicus Tatarinov, 1960

= Archosaurus =

Archosaurus Temporal range: Late Permian, 252 Ma

Extinct genus of reptiles

Archosaurus (meaning "ruling lizard") is an extinct genus of carnivorous proterosuchid archosauriform reptile. Its fossils are dated to the latest Permian of Russia, it is one of the earliest known archosauriforms. The type and only species is Archosaurus rossicus, known from several fragmentary specimens which cumulatively represent parts of the skull and cervical vertebrae. It would have been 3 m (9 ft 10 in) long when fully grown. Archosaurus is the namesake of the Archosaurus zone (Vyazniki Assemblage), the final Late Permian tetrapod biozone in Russia.

When first described in 1960, Archosaurus was considered the oldest known archosaur and a close relative of Proterosuchus from the Early Triassic. However, Archosauria in modern terms is considered a more restricted group which Archosaurus lies outside of. The "classic" definition of archosaur utilized prior to the widespread use of cladistics is now roughly equivalent to the clade Archosauriformes. Archosaurus is still considered the oldest undisputed archosauriform, as well as one of the few valid members of the family Proterosuchidae.

A 2023 study placed Archosaurus in the new subfamily Chasmatosuchinae within the proterosuchids. This would make Archosaurus significantly derived despite being the oldest known archosauriform, indicating that significant diversification already occurred among proterosuchids during the Permian.

== Gallery ==
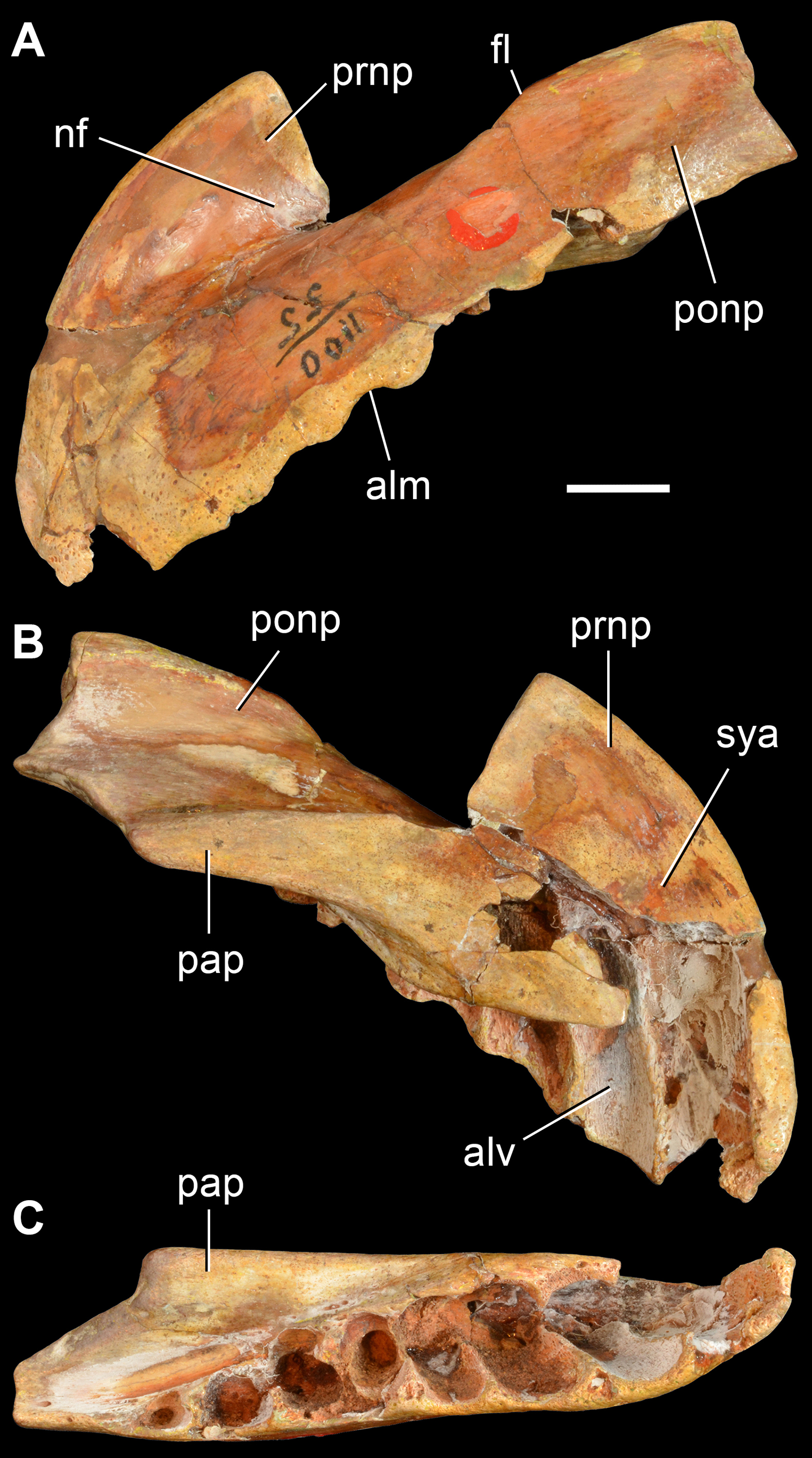
PIN 1100/55, the holotype left premaxilla

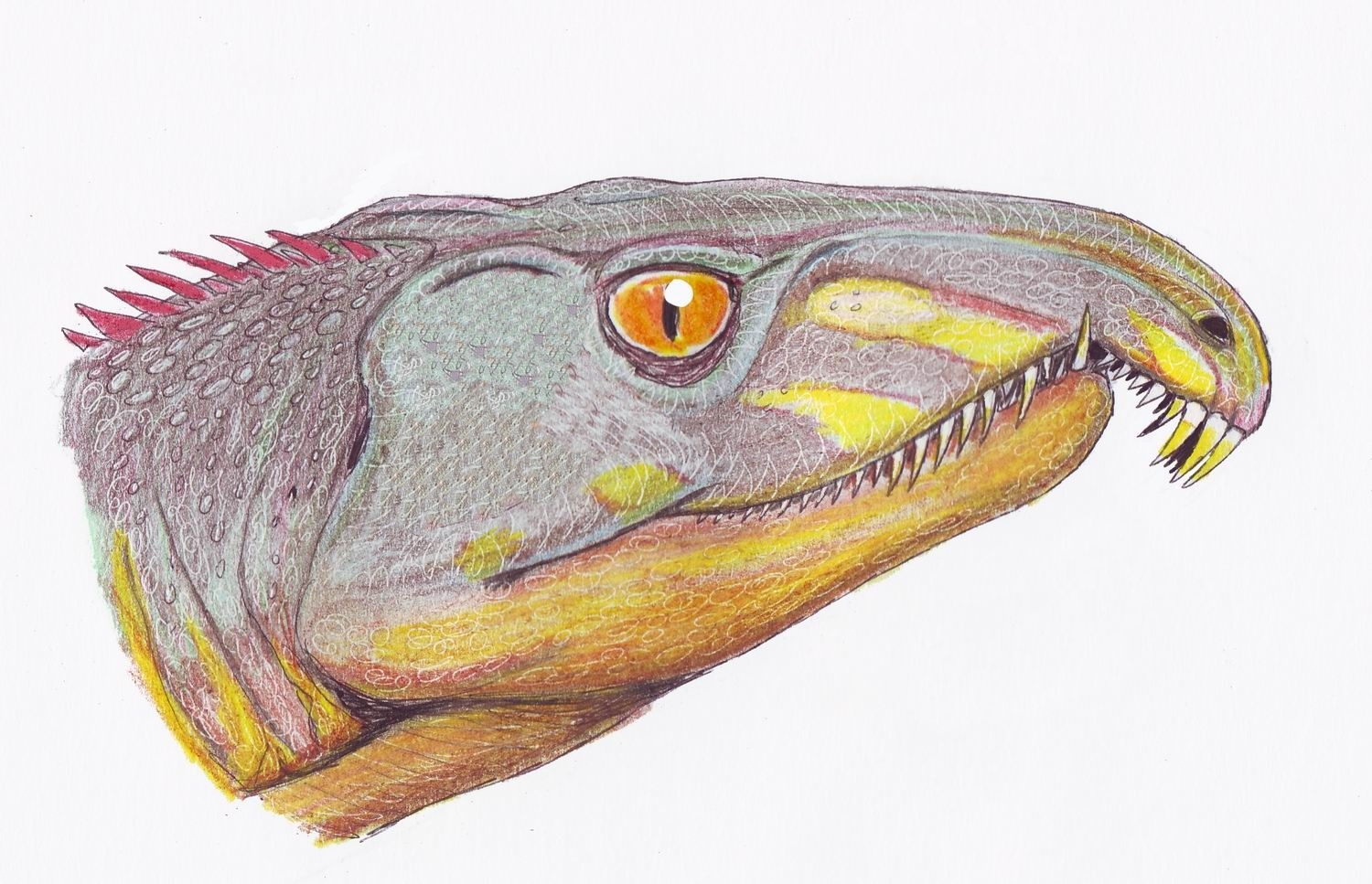
Restoration

Size comparison

== See also ==
- Proterosuchus
