= Fugusuchus =

Fugusuchus Temporal range: Late Olenekian–Early Anisian

Scientific classification
- Kingdom: Animalia
- Phylum: Chordata
- Class: Reptilia
- Clade: Archosauriformes
- Family: †Erythrosuchidae
- Genus: †Fugusuchus; Cheng, 1980

Species
- †F. hejiapensis Cheng, 1980 (type)

Extinct genus of reptiles

Fugusuchus is an extinct genus of archosauriform, probably the basal-most member of the family Erythrosuchidae. The genus is known from a single fossil from the middle Early Triassic Heshanggou Formation in Shanxi, China. The partial skeleton consists of an incomplete skull, parts of the right forelimb, and an intercentrum. The skeleton, known as GMB V 313, is currently in the Geological Museum of China in Beijing.

Fugusuchus was a medium-sized archosauriform. It has a long and relatively low skull, unlike the higher more pointed skulls of related genera such as Erythrosuchus. In Fugusuchus, the tooth row of the upper jaw extends beneath the orbit, or eye socket. This feature distinguishes it from more advanced erythrosuchids such as Garjainia and Erythrosuchus, in which teeth are only present in front of the orbital area.
