= 2021 in reptile paleontology =

This list of fossil reptiles described in 2021 is a list of new taxa of fossil reptiles that were described during the year 2021, as well as other significant discoveries and events related to reptile paleontology that occurred in 2021.

== Squamates ==
=== New squamate taxa ===
Name	Novelty	Status	Authors	Age	Type locality	Location	Notes	Images
Afrotortrix	Gen. et sp. nov	Valid	Rage et al.	Eocene		Algeria	An anilioid-grade snake. The type species is A. draaensis.	
Caeruleodentatus	Gen. et sp. nov	Valid	Scarpetta	Miocene	Split Rock Formation	United States (Wyoming)	A member of Iguania. Genus includes new species C. lovei.	
Ectenosaurus everhartorum	Sp. nov	Valid	Willman, Konishi & Caldwell	Late Cretaceous		United States (Kansas)	A plioplatecarpine mosasaur.	
Elgaria peludoverde	Sp. nov	Valid	Scarpetta, Ledesma & Bell	Pliocene	Olla Formation	United States (California)	A species of Elgaria.	
Heterodon meadi	Sp. nov	Valid	Jurestovsky	Hemphillian	Gray Fossil Site	United States (Tennessee)	A species of Heterodon.	
Leiocephalus roquetus	Sp. nov	Valid	Bochaton, Charles & Lenoble	Quaternary		France (La Désirade Island)	A curly-tailed lizard.	
Morohasaurus	Gen. et sp. nov	In press	Ikeda et al.	Early Cretaceous	Ohyamashimo Formation	Japan	A member or a relative of the group Monstersauria. Genus includes new species M. kamitakiens.	
Oculudentavis naga	Sp. nov	Valid	Bolet et al.	Late Cretaceous (Cenomanian)	Burmese amber	Myanmar	A lizard of uncertain phylogenetic placement.	
Palaeopython schaali	Sp. nov	In press	Smith & Scanferla	Eocene	Messel pit	Germany		
Palaeovaranus lismonimenos	Sp. nov	Valid	Georgalis, Čerňanský & Klembara	Probably late Eocene	Quercy Phosphorites Formation	France	A member of Anguimorpha belonging to the family Palaeovaranidae.	
Paleochelco	Gen. et sp. nov	Valid	Martinelli, Agnolín & Ezcurra	Late Cretaceous (Santonian)	Bajo de la Carpa Formation	Argentina	Possibly a member of Polyglyphanodontia. The type species is P. occultato.	
Paranecrosaurus	Gen. et comb. nov	Valid	Smith & Habersetzer	Eocene	Messel Formation	Germany	A palaeovaranid anguimorph. The type species is "Saniwa" feisti Stritzke (1983).	
Phosphoroboa	Gen. et comb. nov	Valid	Georgalis, Rabi & Smith	Probably middle or late Eocene	Quercy Phosphorites Formation	France	A snake belonging to the group Booidea. The type species is "Palaeopython" filholii Rochebrune (1880).	
Pluridens serpentis	Sp. nov	Valid	Longrich et al.	Late Cretaceous (Maastrichtian)	Ouled Abdoun Basin	Morocco	A mosasaur.	
Proegernia mikebulli	Sp. nov	Valid	Thorn et al.	Late Oligocene	Namba Formation	Australia	An egerniine skink.	
Protodraco	Gen. et sp. nov	Valid	Wagner et al.	Late Cretaceous (Cenomanian)	Burmese amber	Myanmar	A member of the family Agamidae. Genus includes new species P. monocoli.	
Pseudeumeces kyrillomethodicus	Sp. nov	Valid	Georgalis, Čerňanský & Klembara	Probably Oligocene	Quercy Phosphorites Formation	France	A member of the family Lacertidae belonging to the subfamily Gallotiinae.	
Rageryx	Gen. et sp. nov	Valid	Smith & Scanferla	Eocene (Ypresian or Lutetian)	Messel Formation	Germany	An erycine boid snake. The type species is R. schmidi.	
Sciroseps	Gen. et sp. nov	Valid	Suarez et al.	Early Cretaceous (Albian)	Holly Creek Formation	United States (Arkansas)	A member of the family Paramacellodidae. The type species is S. pawhuskai.	
Xenodens	Gen. et sp. nov	Disputed	Longrich et al.	Late Cretaceous (Maastrichtian)	Ouled Abdoun Basin	Morocco	A mosasaurine mosasaur. Genus includes new species X. calminechari. Sharpe, Powers & Caldwell (2024) considered X. calminechari to be nomen dubium, and interpreted its type material as subjected to a forgery.	

=== Research ===
- A study on the evolution of tooth complexity in squamates, based on data from extant and fossil taxa, is published by Lafuma et al. (2021).
- A study on the diversity of jaw sizes, lower jaw shape and morphology of teeth in Cretaceous squamates is published by Herrera-Flores, Stubbs & Benton (2021), who interpret their findings as indicating that a substantial expansion of ecomorphological diversity of squamates occurred in the mid-Cretaceous, 110–90 Ma, before the first rise in taxonomic diversity of this group in the Campanian.
- A study on the dietary preferences of lizards from the Upper Cretaceous Iharkút vertebrate locality (Hungary) is published by Gere et al. (2021).
- A study on the locomotion of five Cretaceous lizards, and on its implications for the knowledge of the ancestral locomotion type in lizards, is published by Villaseñor-Amador, Suárez & Cruz (2021), who interpret their findings as indicating that Huehuecuetzpalli mixtecus was bipedal while Tijubina pontei was facultatively bipedal.
- Augé, Dion & Phélizon (2021) describe the lizard fauna from the Paleocene locality of Montchenot (Paris Basin, France), and evaluate the implications of this fauna for the knowledge of diversity changes of European squamate faunas across the Paleocene/Eocene boundary.
- Čerňanský et al. (2021) describe new fossil material of lizards from two Miocene sites in Kutch (Gujarat, India), providing new information on the composition and biogeography of South Asian lizard faunas during the Miocene.
- Revision of the fossil material of lizards and snakes from the Miocene of the Saint-Gérand-le-Puy area (France), including the first records of Ophisaurus holeci and the gallotiine lacertid Janosikia from France, is published by Georgalis & Scheyer (2021).
- A study on the fossil record of lizards and snakes from the Guadeloupe Islands, assessing their evolutionary history and diversity over the past 40,000 years, is published by Bochaton et al. (2021), who interpret their findings as indicative of a massive extinction of Guadeloupe's snakes and lizards following European colonization, preceded by thousands of years of coexistence with earlier Indigenous populations.
- A study on the shape and size variation in the maxillae of extant New Zealand diplodactylids, and on its implications for the knowledge of the affinities of subfossil diplodactylid remains, is published by Scarsbrook et al. (2021).
- A study aiming to assess the phylogenetic value of lacertid jaw elements from four Oligocene localities in France, and evaluating their implications for the knowledge of the lacertid species richness in the Oligocene, is published by Wencker et al. (2021).
- A study on the osteological variability in extant species of lacertid lizards, and on its implications for species delimitation in fossil lacertids, is published by Tschopp et al. (2021).
- Fossils of Gallotia goliath are described for the first time from the El Hierro island (Canary Islands) by Palacios-García et al. (2021), providing the first evidence of the possible coexistence of two giant fossil species of Gallotia on the same island.
- Fossil material of a large anguimorph lizard, possibly a member of Varaniformes and potentially one of the largest Mesozoic terrestrial lizards, is described from the Upper Cretaceous (Maastrichtian) Basturs-1 site (Spain) by Cabezuelo Hernández et al. (2021).
- A study on the anatomy and phylogenetic relationships of Tetrapodophis amplectus is published by Caldwell et al. (2021), who reinterpret this squamate as a dolichosaur.
- A yaguarasaurine mosasauroid is reported from the Cenomanian-Turonian beds of Coahuila (Mexico) by Jiménez-Huidobro et al. (2021), representing the earliest occurrence of a non-aigialosaur mosasauroid from North America reported to date.
- Redescription and a study on the geographic provenance of the fossil material of "Liodon" asiaticum is published by Bardet et al. (2021).
- One to seven month-long life histories of specimens of Platecarpus tympaniticus and Clidastes propython collected from chalk deposits of the Western Interior Seaway and Mississippi Embayment in Kansas and Alabama are reconstructed by Travis Taylor et al. (2021), who interpret their findings as indicative of semi-regular travels of these mosasaurs from marine to freshwater coastal environments and consumption of freshwater.
- Fossil material providing the first evidence of the presence of Plotosaurus-type mosasaurs in the Northwestern Pacific Ocean reported to date is described from the Campanian Hiraiso Formation and Maastrichtian Isoai Formation (Japan) by Kato et al. (2021).
- First confirmed non-dental mosasaur remains from the Maastrichtian Breien Member of the Hell Creek Formation (North Dakota, United States) are described by Van Vranken & Boyd (2021).
- A study on the evolutionary history of snakes, aiming to determine possible impact of the Cretaceous–Paleogene extinction event on the evolution and dispersal of snakes, is published by Klein et al. (2021).
- An assemblage of vertebrae of Palaeophis africanus, representing the most abundant material of this snake reported to date and providing new information on its anatomy, is described from the Eocene (Lutetian) of Togo by Georgalis et al. (2021).
- A vertebra of Naja romani is described from the Miocene (Turolian) Solnechnodolsk locality (Northern Caucasus, Russia) by Syromyatnikova, Tesakov & Titov (2021), representimg the latest known record of this species and expanding its geographic and geological range.
- Biton & Bailon (2021) report the discovery of fossil material of adders belonging to the Bitis arietans complex from the early Late Pleistocene of the Qafzeh cave (Israel), representing the northernmost record of the expansion of these adders outside Africa reported to date, and evaluate the implications of this finding for the knowledge of the climatic and environmental conditions in the surroundings of the Qafzeh Cave during the Mousterian Homo sapiens occupations.

== Ichthyosauromorphs ==
=== New taxa ===
Name	Novelty	Status	Authors	Age	Type locality	Location	Notes	Images
Auroroborealia	Gen. et sp. nov	In press	Zverkov et al.	Late Triassic		Russia (Sakha)	An early ichthyosaur of uncertain phylogenetic placement, possibly with toretocnemid or parvipelvian affinities. Genus includes new species A. incognita.	
Catutosaurus	Gen. et sp. nov	Valid	Fernández et al.	Late Jurassic (Tithonian)		Argentina	An ichthyosaur belonging to the family Ophthalmosauridae. Genus includes new species C. gaspariniae.	
Cymbospondylus youngorum	Sp. nov		Sander et al.	Middle Triassic (Anisian)	Favret Formation	United States (Nevada)		
Kazakhstanosaurus	Gen. et sp. nov		Bolatovna and Maksutovich	Late Jurassic		KazakhstanRussia	An ichthyosaur belonging to the family Ophthalmosauridae. Genus includes new species K. shchuchkinensis and K. efimovi.	
Kyhytysuka	Gen. et comb. nov		Cortés, Maxwell, and Larsson	Early Cretaceous (Barremian-Aptian)	Paja Formation	Colombia	An ichthyosaur belonging to the family Ophthalmosauridae. The type species is "Platypterygius" sachicarum Páramo (1997).	
Jabalisaurus	Gen. et sp. nov	Valid	Barrientos-Lara and Alvarado-Ortega	Late Jurassic (Kimmeridgian)	La Casita Formation	Mexico	An ichthyosaur belonging to the family Ophthalmosauridae. The type species is J. meztli	
Parrassaurus	Gen. et sp. nov	Valid	Barrientos-Lara & Alvarado-Ortega	Late Jurassic (Tithonian)	La Caja Formation	Mexico	An ichthyosaur belonging to the family Ophthalmosauridae. The type species is P. yacahuitztli	
Sumpalla	Gen. et sp. nov	Valid	Campos et al.	Late Jurassic	Vaca Muerta	Argentina	An ichthyosaur belonging to the family Ophthalmosauridae. Genus includes new species S. argentina	

=== Research ===
- Description of anatomy of the palate of Chaohusaurus brevifemoralis is published by Yin, Ji & Zhou (2021).
- A study on the anatomy of the skull of the holotype specimen of Besanosaurus leptorhynchus, description of additional specimens from the Middle Triassic Besano Formation (Italy/Switzerland) and a study on the phylogenetic relationships of this species is published by Bindellini et al. (2021), who interpret Mikadocephalus gracilirostris as a junior synonym of B. leptorhynchus.
- New stenopterygiid ichthyosaur fossils, representing some of the best preserved Toarcian specimens from Europe (including a specimen with possible soft tissue preservation), are described from south-east France by Martin et al. (2021), who also attempt to determine the causes of the state of preservation of the studied specimens, and evaluate the implications of the study site for the knowledge of the environmental perturbations associated with the Toarcian Oceanic Anoxic Event.
- A specimen of Ichthyosaurus belonging or related to the species I. communis is identified from the Sinemurian Coimbra Formation (Portugal) by Sousa & Mateus (2021), representing the southernmost occurrence of Ichthyosaurus reported to date.
- A study on the anatomy of narial structures in Early Jurassic ichthyosaurs, and on their implications for the knowledge of the evolution of the bony subdivision of the external naris in more derived ichthyosaurs, is published by Massare, Wahl & Lomax (2021).
- The first unambiguous ichthyosaur remains from Antarctica reported to date are described from the Upper Jurassic Ameghino (=Nordenskjöld) Formation by Campos et al. (2021), who also revise remains of two ichthyosaur specimens from the Upper Jurassic of Madagascar, and describe a third specimen which is the most complete ichthyosaur from this region of Gondwanaland.
- A study aiming to determine whether Cretaceous ichthyosaur remains from Australia can be attributed to the species Platypterygius australis on the basis of vertebral data alone is published by Vakil, Webb & Cook (2021).

== Sauropterygians ==
=== New taxa ===
Name	Novelty	Status	Authors	Age	Type locality	Location	Notes	Images
Eiectus	Gen. et sp. nov	Disputed	Noè & Gómez-Pérez	Early Cretaceous (Aptian and Albian)		Australia	A pliosaurid, described after specimens described as Kronosaurus queenlandicus other than fragmentary holotype. Genus includes new species E. longmani. Some later researches criticized the reassignments.	
Fluvionectes	Gen. et sp. nov	Valid	Campbell et al.	Late Cretaceous (Campanian)	Dinosaur Park Formation	Canada (Alberta)	An elasmosaurid plesiosaur. The type species is F. sloanae.	
Monquirasaurus	Gen. et comb. nov	Valid	Noè & Gómez-Pérez	Early Cretaceous		Colombia	A pliosaurid; a new genus for "Kronosaurus" boyacensis Hampe (1992).	
Plesiopharos	Gen. et sp. nov	Valid	Puértolas-Pascual et al.	Early Jurassic (Sinemurian)	Coimbra Formation	Portugal	An early member of Plesiosauroidea. The type species is P. moelensis.	
Wumengosaurus rotundicarpus	Sp. nov	Valid	Qin et al.	Middle Triassic (Anisian)		China	A possible pachypleurosaur; a species of Wumengosaurus.	
Wunyelfia	Gen. et sp. nov	Valid	Otero & Soto-Acuña	Late Cretaceous (Maastrichtian)	Quiriquina	Chile	An aristonectine elasmosaurid plesiosaur. Genus includes new species W. maulensis. Announced in 2020; the final version of the article naming was published in 2021.	

=== Research ===
- A study on the anatomy and replacement pattern of teeth in Henodus chelyops is published by Pommery et al. (2021).
- A large teeth-bearing dentary of an eosauropterygian of uncertain phylogenetic placement, probably related to the enigmatic Lamprosauroides goepperti, is described from the Lower Muschelkalk (Anisian, Middle Triassic) of Winterswijk (Netherlands) by Spiekman & Klein (2021).
- A study on the bone histology and possible affinities of Proneusticosaurus silesiacus is published by Klein & Surmik (2021).
- Description of a new specimen of Panzhousaurus rotundirostris from the Guanling Formation (Guizhou, China), providing new information on the anatomy of this reptile, and a study on the phylogenetic relationships of this species is published by Lin et al. (2021).
- New specimen of Diandongosaurus, belonging or related to the species D. acutidentatus (though approximately three times larger than the holotype of that species) and lacking most of the right hindlimb, is described from the Anisian Guanling Formation (China) by Liu et al. (2021), who interpret the right hindlimb of this specimen as likely amputated in an attack by an unknown hunter.
- The remains of an indeterminate plesiosaur are reported from the Hauterivian Katterfeld Formation (Chile) by Poblete-Huanca et al. (2021), representing the first record of a Lower Cretaceous plesiosaur from Chile.
- A tooth crown of a pliosaurid belonging to the subfamily Brachaucheninae is described from the Cenomanian La Luna Formation (Venezuela) by Bastiaans et al. (2021), representing the most recent record of a pliosaurid from South America reported to date.
- A study aiming to reconstruct the musculature of limbs of Cryptoclidus eurymerus is published by Krahl & Witzel (2021).
- A study on the postcranial materials of xenopsarian plesiosaurs from the Eromanga Basin (Australia), aiming to determine the utility of vertebral analysis for differentiating and/or grouping Australian plesiosaur specimens, is published by Vakil, Webb & Cook (2021).
- Marx et al. (2021) describe a new specimen of Cardiocorax mukulu from the Maastrichtian Mocuio Formation (Angola), including the most complete plesiosaur skull from sub-Saharan Africa reported to date, and evaluate the implications of this specimen for the knowledge of the anatomy and phylogenetic relationships of this plesiosaur.
- Redescription of the anatomy of the skull of Thalassomedon haningtoni, and a study on the phylogenetic relationships of this species, is published by Sachs et al. (2021).
- Description of one of the earliest quarried elasmosaurid specimens from the Campanian–Maastrichtian strata of Antarctica, identified as a non-aristonectine elasmosaurid belonging to the group Weddellonectia, and a study on the evolution of dorsal vertebral count in members of Weddellonectia, is published by O'Gorman, Aspromonte & Reguero (2021).
- New information of the skeletal anatomy of Alexandronectes zealandiensis is provided by O'Gorman et al. (2021).
- The most complete specimen of Kawanectes lafquenianum reported to date, providing new information on the anatomy of this plesiosaur, is described by O'Gorman (2021).
- Talevi et al. (2021) describe a pathological cervical vertebra of a plesiosaur from the Maastrichtian of Argentina, and interpret this finding as the first record of tuberculosis-like infection in a plesiosaur reported to date.

== Turtles ==
=== New taxa ===
Name	Novelty	Status	Authors	Age	Type locality	Location	Notes	Images
Adocus kohaku	Sp. nov	Valid	Hirayama et al.	Late Cretaceous (Turonian)	Tamagawa Formation	Japan		
Akoranemys	Gen. et sp. nov	In press	Pérez-García	Late Cretaceous (Cenomanian)		Madagascar	A member of the family Bothremydidae belonging to the tribe Bothremydini and subtribe Bothremydina. Genus includes new species A. madagasika.	
Apeshemys	Gen. et comb. nov	Valid	Pérez-García	Miocene (Burdigalian)	Moghra Formation	Egypt	A member of the family Podocnemididae belonging to the subfamily Erymnochelyinae. The type species is "Podocnemis" aegyptiaca Andrews (1900).	
Chelonoidis petrocellii	Sp. nov	Valid	Agnolin	Middle Pleistocene		Argentina	A tortoise, a species of Chelonoidis.	
Elkanemys	Gen. et sp. nov	In press	Maniel, de la Fuente & Canale	Late Cretaceous (Cenomanian)	Candeleros Formation	Argentina	A member of the family Bothremydidae belonging to the tribe Cearachelyini. Genus includes new species E. pritchardi.	
Globochelus	Gen. et sp. nov	Valid	De Lapparent de Broin, Breton & Rioult	Late Jurassic (Kimmeridgian)		France	A member of the family Plesiochelyidae. Genus includes new species G. lennieri.	
Notapachemys	Gen. et sp. nov	Valid	Bourque	Eocene (Chadronian)	Chadron Formation	United States (Nebraska)	A member of the family Geoemydidae. The type species is N. oglala.	
Palatobaena knellerorum	Sp. nov	Valid	Lyson et al.	Paleocene (Danian)	Denver Formation	United States (Colorado)	A member of the family Baenidae.	
Plastomenus joycei	Sp. nov	Valid	Lyson, Petermann & Miller	Paleocene (Danian)	Denver Formation	United States (Colorado)	A soft-shelled turtle.	
Pleurochayah	Gen. et sp. nov	Valid	Adrian et al.	Late Cretaceous (Cenomanian)	Lewisville Formation	United States (Texas)	A member of the family Bothremydidae. The type species is P. appalachius.	
Pleurosternon moncayensis	Sp. nov	In press	Pérez-García et al.	Jurassic-Cretaceous transition		Spain		
Sahonachelys	Gen. et sp. nov	Valid	Joyce et al.	Late Cretaceous (Maastrichtian)	Maevarano Formation	Madagascar	A member of Pleurodira belonging to the group Pelomedusoides. The type species is S. mailakavava.	
Shetwemys	Gen. et comb. nov	Valid	Pérez-García	Oligocene (Rupelian)	Jebel Qatrani Formation	Egypt	A member of the family Podocnemididae belonging to the subfamily Erymnochelyinae. The type species is "Podocnemis" fajumensis Andrews (1903).	
Sindhochelys	Gen. et sp. nov	Valid	Lapparent de Broin et al.	Paleocene (probably early Danian)	Khadro Formation	Pakistan	A member of the family Bothremydidae. The type species is S. ragei.	
Yakemys	Gen. et sp. nov		Tong et al.	Early Cretaceous	Phu Kradung Formation	Thailand	A member of Macrobaenidae. The type species is Y. multiporcata.	

=== Research ===
- A study on the evolution of the organization and composition of the turtle shell is published by Cordero & Vlachos (2021).
- A study on turtle forelimb morphometrics, their relationship to habitat type, and their implications for the knowledge of habitat preferences of fossil turtles, is published by Dudgeon et al. (2021).
- A study on the morphology of the skeleton of Chinlechelys tenertesta, and on its implications for the knowledge of the origin of turtles, is published by Lichtig & Lucas (2021), who reject the interpretation of Eunotosaurus africanus and Pappochelys rosinae as stem-turtles.
- A study on the histology of the carapace and limb bones of Araripemys barretoi, and on the relation between shell microstructure and lifestyle of this turtle, is published by Sena et al. (2021).
- Revision of the Cretaceous bothremydid "Polysternon" atlanticum is published by Pérez-García, Ortega & Murelaga (2021), who consider this taxon to be the senior synonym of Iberoccitanemys convenarum, resulting in a new combination Iberoccitanemys atlanticum.
- Reconstruction of the skull and neuroanatomical structures of Tartaruscola teodorii is presented by Martín-Jiménez & Pérez-García (2021).
- New fossil material of Stupendemys geographica and Caninemys tridentata is described from the Miocene La Victoria Formation (Colombia) by Cadena et al. (2021), who reestablish the validity of C. tridentata as a taxon distinct from S. geographica, and evaluate the implications of the studied fossils for the knowledge of the changes in the shell and scutes during the ontogeny in S. geographica.
- Redescription and a study on the phylogenetic relationships of Uluops uluops is published by Rollot, Evers & Joyce (2021).
- Redescription of the anatomy of the skull of Arundelemys dardeni is published by Evers, Rollot & Joyce (2021).
- A study on the morphological variability in the shell of Pleurosternon bullockii is published by Guerrero & Pérez-García (2021).
- A study on the ontogenetic development of Pleurosternon bullockii, based on data from small specimens from the Berriasian Purbeck Limestone Group (United Kingdom), is published by Guerrero & Pérez-García (2021).
- New fossil material of Plesiochelys is described from the Upper Jurassic (Tithonian) of the Lusitanian Basin (Portugal) by Pérez-García & Ortega (2021), who also revise the Oxfordian species "Hispaniachelys" prebetica and transfer it to the genus Plesiochelys, making it the oldest representative of this genus reported to date.
- Two specimens of thalassochelydian turtles, including a partial hindlimb with well-preserved remains of skin and a large, articulated skeleton of Thalassemys bruntrutana, documenting the presence of particularly elongate forelimbs in this turtle, are described from the Upper Jurassic of Germany by Joyce, Mäuser & Evers (2021), who interpret these specimens as providing evidence of presence of highly keratinized and partially stiffened flippers in some Late Jurassic turtles, structurally similar to those of extant sea turtles.
- A study on the skeletal anatomy of Manchurochelys manchoukuoensis, based on data from a new specimens from the Lower Cretaceous Yixian Formation (China), is published by Li, Zhou & Rabi (2021).
- A large, thick-shelled turtle egg, preserving an embryo of a nanhsiungchelyid possibly belonging to the species Yuchelys nanyangensis, is described from the Upper Cretaceous Xiaguan Formation (China) by Ke et al. (2021).
- An upper Miocene to lower Pliocene carettochelyid fossil, representing the southernmost record of this group reported to date, is described from Beaumaris (Victoria, Australia) by Rule et al. (2021), who interpret this finding and a discontinuous record of soft-shell turtles in the Cenozoic of Queensland as evidence of at least two colonizations of Australia by Trionychia, pre-dating the extant pig-nosed turtle.
- Georgalis (2021) describes a large costal of a soft-shelled turtle from the Eocene of Mali, representing the first record of pan-trionychid turtles from the Paleogene of Africa reported to date.
- New specimens of the tortoises Hadrianus majusculus and H. corsoni and geoemydids Echmatemys haydeni and E. naomi, including skull and juvenile material, and providing new information on the morphology, intraspecific variation and ontogeny of these turtles, are described from the Eocene Willwood Formation and Green River Formation (Wyoming, United States) by Lichtig, Lucas & Jasinski (2021).
- A study on the phylogenetic relationships of Eocene geoemydids "Ocadia" kehreri and "Ocadia" messeliana from the Messel pit (Germany) is published by Ascarrunz, Claude & Joyce (2021).
- Description of new fossil material of Bridgeremys pusilla from the Uinta Formation (Utah, United States), and a study on the differences in morphology of the shell and likely ecology of B. pusilla and two coeval species of Echmatemys, is published by Adrian et al. (2021).
- A study on the phylogenetic relationships and evolutionary history of the tortoise Chelonoidis alburyorum from The Bahamas, based on data from nearly complete mitochondrial genomes, is published by Kehlmaier et al. (2021).
- A study on the identity of the type material of Centrochelys atlantica, based on data from ancient DNA, is published by Kehlmaier et al. (2021), who identify this material as belonging to a specimen of the red-footed tortoise, leaving the Quaternary tortoise known from fossils excavated on the Sal Island in the 1930s without a scientific name.
- A well-preserved humerus a of giant turtle, representing the first known record of gigantic Mesozoic sea turtles in Africa, is described from the Maastrichtian Dakhla Formation (Egypt) by Abu El-Kheir, AbdelGawad & Kassab (2021).
- New specimen of Euclastes wielandi is described from the Paleocene (Danian) Hornerstown Formation (New Jersey, United States) by Ullmann & Carr (2021), who interpret this specimen as proving that E. wielandi is a senior synonym of Catapleura repanda, and study the phylogenetic relationships of E. wielandi.
- A hard-shelled sea turtle specimen, preserved with vestigial soft tissues and likely with incompletely healed bite marks inflicted by a crocodylian or another large-sized seagoing tetrapod, is described from the Eocene (Ypresian) Fur Formation (Denmark) by De La Garza et al. (2021).

== Archosauriformes ==
=== Other archosauriforms ===
==== New taxa ====
Name	Novelty	Status	Authors	Age	Type locality	Location	Notes	Images
Bharitalasuchus	Gen. et sp. nov	Valid	Ezcurra, Bandyopadhyay & Gower	Middle Triassic	Yerrapalli Formation	India	A member of the family Erythrosuchidae. The type species is B. tapani.	
Heteropelta	Gen. et sp. nov	Valid	Dalla Vecchia	Middle Triassic (Anisian)	Torbiditi d'Aupa Formation	Italy	A member of Archosauriformes of uncertain phylogenetic placement, possibly a basal archosauriform, basal phytosaur or a suchian archosaur. The type species is H. boboi.	
Incertovenator	Gen. et sp. nov	Valid	Yáñez et al.	Late Triassic	Ischigualasto Formation	Argentina	An archosauriform (possibly an archosaur) of uncertain phylogenetic placement. The type species is I. longicollum.	
Kranosaura	Gen. et sp. nov	Valid	Nesbitt et al.	Late Triassic (Norian)	Upper Maleri Formation	India	A dome-headed archosauriform closely related to Triopticus, with which it forms the new clade Protopyknosia. The type species is K. kuttyi.	
Syntomiprosopus	Gen. et sp. nov	Valid	Heckert et al.	Late Triassic (Norian)	Chinle Formation	US (Arizona)	A short-faced archosauriform of uncertain affinity, possibly an early-diverging crocodylomorph. The type species is S. sucherorum.	

==== Research ====
- A study on the femoral shape variation and on the relationship between femoral morphology and locomotor habits in early archosaurs and non-archosaur archosauriforms is published by Pintore et al. (2021).
- Fossil material of a member of the genus Doswellia belonging or related to the species D. kaltenbachi is described from the Upper Triassic Chinle Formation (Arizona, United States) by Parker et al. (2021), who interpret this finding as evidence of biogeographic links between the vertebrate assemblage from the Chinle Formation and other Late Triassic assemblages from Texas and Virginia.
- A study on bone histology of proterochampsid specimens from the Triassic Chañares Formation (Argentina), aiming to infer history traits related to growth dynamics, ontogenetic changes, dermal armor histogenesis and lifestyle, is published by Ponce et al. (2021).
- A large phytosaur specimen likely belonging to the species Smilosuchus gregorii, preserved with evidence of pathologies evoking aspects of both osteomyelitis and hypertrophic osteopathy, is described from Norian strata near St. Johns (Arizona, United States) by Heckert, Viner & Carrano (2021).
- A study on the enamel microstructure of phytosaur teeth from western and eastern North American localities, evaluating their implications for the knowledge of biogeographic distributions and ecology of phytosaurs, is published by Hoffman, Miller-Camp & Heckert (2021).

== Other reptiles ==
=== New taxa ===
Name	Novelty	Status	Authors	Age	Type locality	Location	Notes	Images
Balearosaurus	Gen. et sp. nov	Valid	Matamales-Andreu et al.	Permian		Spain	A moradisaurine captorhinid. Genus includes new species B. bombardensis.	
Delorhynchus multidentatus	Sp. nov		Rowe et al.	Permian (Cisuralian)		United States (Oklahoma)		
Elorhynchus	Gen. et sp. nov	Valid	Ezcurra et al.	Triassic (Ladinian–Carnian)	Chañares Formation	Argentina	A rhynchosaur. Genus includes new species E. carrolli.	
Karutia	Gen. et sp. nov	Valid	Cisneros et al.	Permian (Cisuralian)	Pedra de Fogo Formation	Brazil	A member of the family Acleistorhinidae. Genus includes new species K. fortunata.	
Mengshanosaurus	Gen. et sp. nov	Valid	Meng et al.	Early Cretaceous (Berriasian-Valanginian)	Mengyin Formation	China	A choristodere belonging to Neochoristodera, the type species is M. minimus.	
Microsphenodon	Gen. et sp. nov	Valid	Chambi-Trowell et al.	Late Triassic (Norian)		Brazil	An early eusphenodontian rhynchocephalian. Genus includes new species M. bonapartei.	
Oryporan	Gen. et sp. nov	Valid	Pinheiro, Silva-Neves & Da-Rosa	Early Triassic	Sanga do Cabral Formation	Brazil	A procolophonid parareptile. Genus includes new species O. insolitus.	
Rhodotheratus	Gen. et comb. nov	Valid	Albright, Sumida & Jung	Early Permian	Hennessey Formation	United States (Oklahoma)	A captorhinid. Genus includes "Captorhinikos" parvus Olson (1970).	
Sphenofontis	Gen. et sp. nov	Valid	Villa et al.	Late Jurassic (Kimmeridgian)	Torleite Formation	Germany	A rhynchocephalian belonging to the family Sphenodontidae. The type species is S. velserae.	
Stauromatodon	Gen. et sp. nov	Valid	Sobral, Sues & Schoch	Middle Triassic (Ladinian)	Erfurt Formation	Germany	A diapsid reptile of uncertain phylogenetic placement. Genus includes new species S. mohli.	
Taytalura	Gen. et sp. nov	Valid	Martínez et al.	Late Triassic	Ischigualasto Formation	Argentina	A stem-lepidosaur. Genus includes new species T. alcoberi.	
Tika	Gen. et sp. nov	Valid	Apesteguía, Garberoglio & Gómez	Late Cretaceous (Cenomanian)	Candeleros Formation	Argentina	A sphenodontine sphenodontid. Genus includes new species T. giacchinoi.	
Trullidens	Gen. et sp. nov	Valid	Kligman et al.	Late Triassic (Norian)		United States (Colorado)	A rhynchocephalian belonging to the group Opisthodontia. Genus includes new species T. purgatorii.	
Vinitasaura	Gen. et sp. nov	Valid	Sues & Kligman	Late Triassic (Carnian)	Vinita Formation	United States (Virginia)	A member of Lepidosauromorpha. Genus includes new species V. lizae.	

=== Research ===
- Revision of putative Carboniferous reptile tracks, evaluating their implications for the knowledge of the evolution of locomotor capabilities of putative trackmakers and of the biogeography of the earliest reptiles, is published by Marchetti et al. (2021), who interpret Hylopus hardingi as tracks probably produced by anamniote reptiliomorphs.
- Footprints of early reptiles, including footprints representing the ichnotaxon Notalacerta missouriensis and footprints possibly belonging to the ichnogenus Notalacerta, are described from the Meisenheim, Tambach, Sulzbach and Standenbühl formations (Pennsylvanian and Cisuralian, Germany) by Marchetti et al. (2021), potentially extending the European record of the ichnogenus Notalacerta back to the Moscovian.
- Revision of diagnostic characters used to identify mesosaur species is published by Piñeiro et al. (2021), who report that they could not find unambiguous autapomorphies that characterized Brazilosaurus or Stereosternum.
- Redescription of the holotype and description of the second known specimen of Eudibamus cursoris, providing new information on the skeletal anatomy and locomotor abilities of this reptile, is published by Berman et al. (2021).
- A study on the anatomy of the skull of Nochelesaurus alexanderi is published by Van den Brandt et al. (2021).
- A study on the anatomy of the postcranial skeletons of Bradysaurus baini, Embrithosaurus schwarzi and Nochelesaurus alexanderi is published by van den Brandt et al. (2021).
- A study on the skeletal anatomy and phylogenetic relationships of Provelosaurus americanus, based on data from new fossils and a review of the previously described material, is published by Cisneros, Dentzien-Dias & Francischini (2021).
- Romano et al. (2021) provide a body mass estimate of Scutosaurus karpinskii.
- Tetrapod footprints assigned to the ichnogenus Hyloidichnus, produced by captorhinids or similar reptiles and providing new information on the locomotion of these reptiles, are described from the Permian Pelitic Formation of Gonfaron (Le Luc Basin, Var, France) by Logghe et al. (2021).
- Description of a new specimen of Anthracodromeus longipes from the Carboniferous Allegheny Group (Ohio, United States), preserving an ungual-bearing manus and pedes, and a study on the locomotor ecology of this reptile is published by Mann et al. (2021).
- Partial ilium of a non-archosauromorph neodiapsid reptile is described from the upper Panchet Formation (India) by Ezcurra, Bandyopadhyay & Sen (2021), expanding known diversity of Early Triassic reptiles from this formation.
- A study on the skeletal anatomy, gliding apparatus and phylogenetic relationships of Weigeltisaurus jaekeli, based on data from a nearly complete skeleton from the Upper Permian Kupferschiefer (Germany), is published by Pritchard et al. (2021).
- Redescription of the anatomy of the skull of Coelurosauravus elivensis is published by Buffa et al. (2021).
- A study on the anatomy and phylogenetic relationships of Paliguana whitei is published by Ford et al. (2021).
- A study on the anatomy and phylogenetic relationships of Marmoretta oxoniensis is published by Griffiths et al. (2021).
- Putative choristoderan maxilla from the Bathonian Peski locality (Moskvoretskaya Formation; Moscow Oblast, Russia) is reinterpreted as a fossil a member of Lepidosauromorpha similar to Fraxinisaura and Marmoretta by Skutschas et al. (2021), who interpret this specimens as the first known record of basal lepidosauromorphs in the Middle Jurassic of European Russia.
- Choristoderan vertebrae, representing the first record of choristoderans from the Upper Cretaceous of Asia reported to date, are described from the Turonian Tamagawa Formation (Japan) by Matsumoto et al. (2021).
- New fossil material of neochoristoderes, representing the first known record of this group from the Atlantic coastal plain, is described from the latest Cretaceous of the Navesink Formation and the Ellisdale Fossil Site (New Jersey, United States) by Dudgeon et al. (2021), who also attempt to determine possible causes of the apparent rarity of neochoristoderes in Appalachia.
- A study comparing cervical morphology and neck mobility in Champsosaurus, Simoedosaurus and extant gharial, and evaluating their implications for the knowledge of the feeding behaviour of choristoderans, is published by Matsumoto, Fujiwara & Evans (2021).
- A study on the phylogenetic relationships of archosauromorph reptiles, aiming to determine the relationships of "protorosaurs", is published by Spiekman, Fraser & Scheyer (2021), who name a new clade Dinocephalosauridae.
- A study on the evolution of the morphological diversity of late Permian to Late Jurassic archosauromorph reptiles is published by Foth, Sookias & Ezcurra (2021).
- A study on the evolution of body size of archosauromorph reptiles during the first 90 million years of their evolutionary history is published by Pradelli, Leardi & Ezcurra (2021).
- Revision and a study on the phylogenetic affinities of Malerisaurus is published by Nesbitt et al. (2021), who interpret this reptile as an early diverging, but late-surviving, carnivorous member of Azendohsauridae.
- Revision and a study on the phylogenetic relationships of Eifelosaurus triadicus is published by Sues, Ezcurra & Schoch (2021).
- A study on patterns of neurocentral suture closure in the vertebrae of hyperodapedontine rhynchosaurs during their ontogeny, evaluating their implications for the knowledge of the evolution of patterns of neurocentral suture closure in archosauromorph reptiles and most likely ancestral condition in archosaurs, is published by Heinrich et al. (2021).
- A study on the anatomy of the skull of the holotype specimen of Hyperodapedon sanjuanensis is published by Gentil & Ezcurra (2021).

== Reptiles in general ==
- A study comparing species richness of synapsids and reptiles during the Pennsylvanian and Cisuralian, evaluating the impact of the preservation biases, of the effect of Lagerstätten, and of contested phylogenetic placement of late Carboniferous and early Permian tetrapods on estimates of relative diversity patterns of synapsids and reptiles, is published by Brocklehurst (2021), who interprets his findings as challenging the assumption that synapsids dominated during the Pennsylvanian and Cisuralian.
- A study on the evolution of the feeding apparatus in early amniotes, aiming to quantify variation in evolutionary rates and constraints during early diversification of amniotes, is published by Brocklehurst & Benson (2021).
- A study comparing the morphology of the maxillary canal of Heleosaurus scholtzi, Varanosaurus acutrostris, Orovenator mayorum and Prolacerta broomi, and evaluating the implications of the morphology of the maxillary canal for the knowledge of the phylogenetic placement of varanopids, is published by Benoit et al. (2021).
- Fischer, Weis & Thuy (2021) describe new ichthyosaur and plesiosaur fossils from successive geological formations in Belgium and Luxembourg spanning the Lower–Middle Jurassic transition, and evaluate the implications of these fossils for the knowledge of the evolution of marine reptile assemblages across the Early–Middle Jurassic transition.
- A study on rates of morphological evolution in the evolutionary history of squamates and rhynchocephalians is published by Herrera-Flores et al. (2021).
