= Monster of Aramberri =

Informal name given to a large pliosaur specimen discovered in Mexico

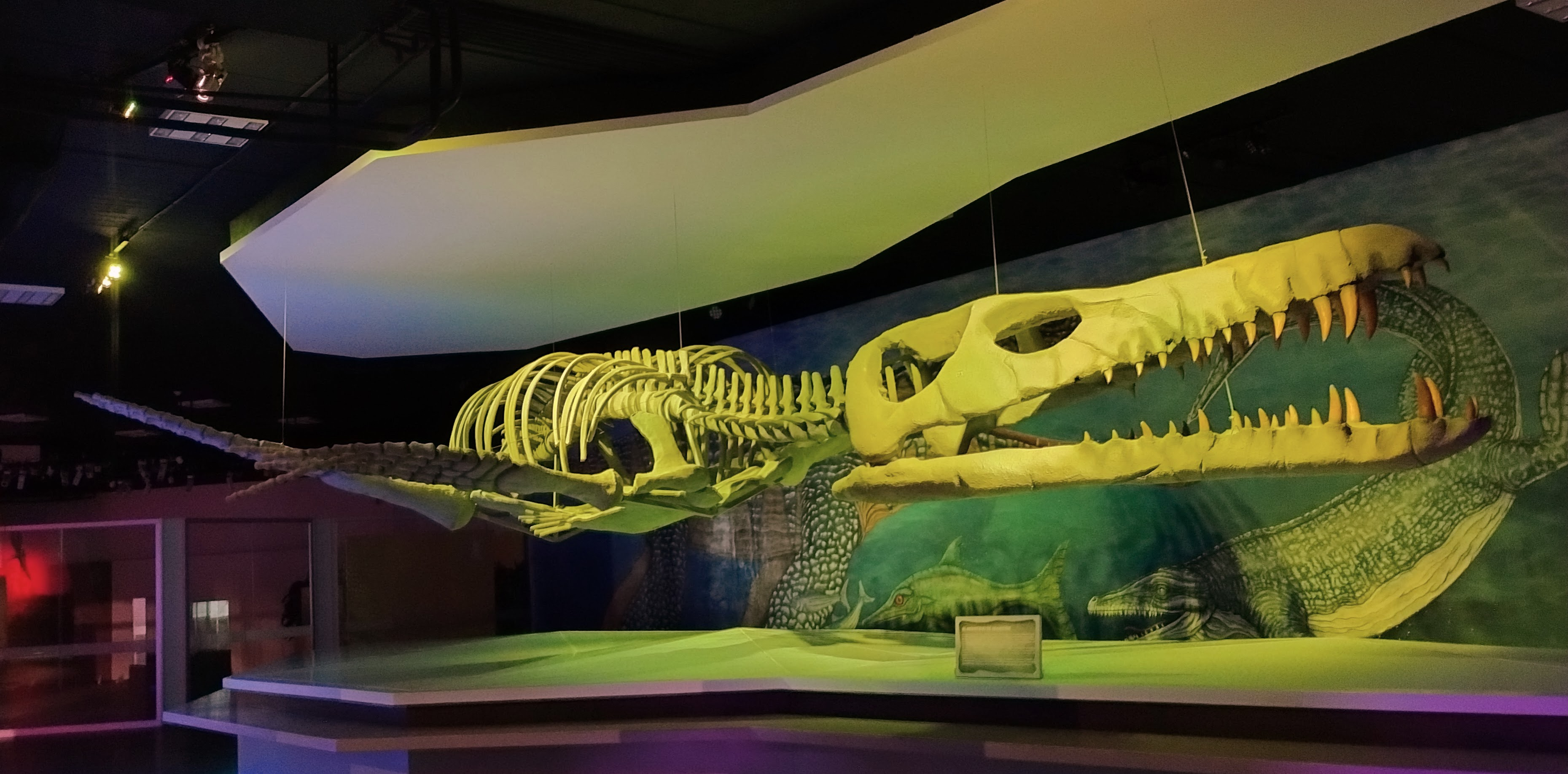
- Reconstructed skeleton, Museo de la Evolución, Puebla
- Catalog no.: UANL-FCT-R2
- Common name: "Monster of Aramberri"
- Species: Unnamed thalassophonean pliosaurid
- Age: Late Kimmeridgian of the Late Jurassic
- Place discovered: Aramberri, Mexico
- Date discovered: 1985 (Note: For an unclear reason, some sources place the year of discovery of the fossil specimen as 1984. In addition, scientific articles do not mention the name of the discoverer of the first known fossils, but a 2012 news says that it is a Mario Alberto Mancilla.)
- Discovered by: Mario Alberto Mancilla

The "Monster of Aramberri" is an informal name given to a fossil skeleton of a very large pliosaur since numbered as UANL-FCT-R2, of which the first remains were discovered in 1985 near the town of Aramberri, Mexico. In scientific literature, some authors also refer to it as the Aramberri pliosaur or the Aramberri specimen. Initially interpreted as a dinosaur in 1988, it was formally reidentified as a marine reptile of the family Pliosauridae in a short 2001 publication. Initially, only two concretions containing the animal's fossils were discovered, with one of the two—containing the fossils of a rostrum and teeth—later noted as lost in the first in-depth study conducted on the specimen in 2003. During the 2000s, a new excavation campaign unearthed several additional fossils of the animal. Subsequently, most of these fossils were sent to Karlsruhe State Museum of Natural History, Germany, to be prepared, before returning them in 2012 to the Autonomous University of Nuevo León, where they are mainly stored. Another significant portion of the fossils are currently stored in the Desert Museum of Saltillo.

The "Monster of Aramberri" is one of the largest pliosaurs ever discovered, but estimates of its size have dropped considerably over the years. Initial estimates set a length of around 15 m (49 ft) based on the assumption that it represents a juvenile, with maximum proposed length estimates up to 18 m (59 ft). Its informal attribution to Liopleurodon by the BBC was linked with the massively over-sized, 25 m (82 ft) long depiction of this genus in the BBC documentary series Walking with Dinosaurs, though the specimen itself wasn't part of the inspiration behind the series' portrayal. More recent, accurate size estimates have since suggested that the specimen likely measures around 10–11 m (33–36 ft) long in total. Nevertheless, the animal would have an approximately 3 m (9.8 ft) long mandible, and the large teeth, since lost, would have possessed two sharp edges.

The specimen is viewed as a representative of the Thalassophonea, a derived clade of pliosaurids characterized by a short neck and a large, elongated skull. The gastralia (abdominal ribs) of the Aramberri pliosaur possess traits that could be diagnostic for a distinct pliosaurid lineage that may soon be described. In the trunk, the Aramberri pliosaur preserves fossils of what appears to be an ichthyosaur, suggesting that this was prey consumed before it died. Two known cranial fragments of the animal also preserve bite marks that would have been made by another, more imposing pliosaur. The La Caja Formation, where the "Monster of Aramberri" was discovered, contains abundant marine fossils from a shallow environment dating from the Kimmeridgian stage of the Late Jurassic. It shared its habitat with a variety of other animals, including invertebrates, fish, thalattosuchians, ichthyosaurs, and other plesiosaurs.

== History of discovery ==
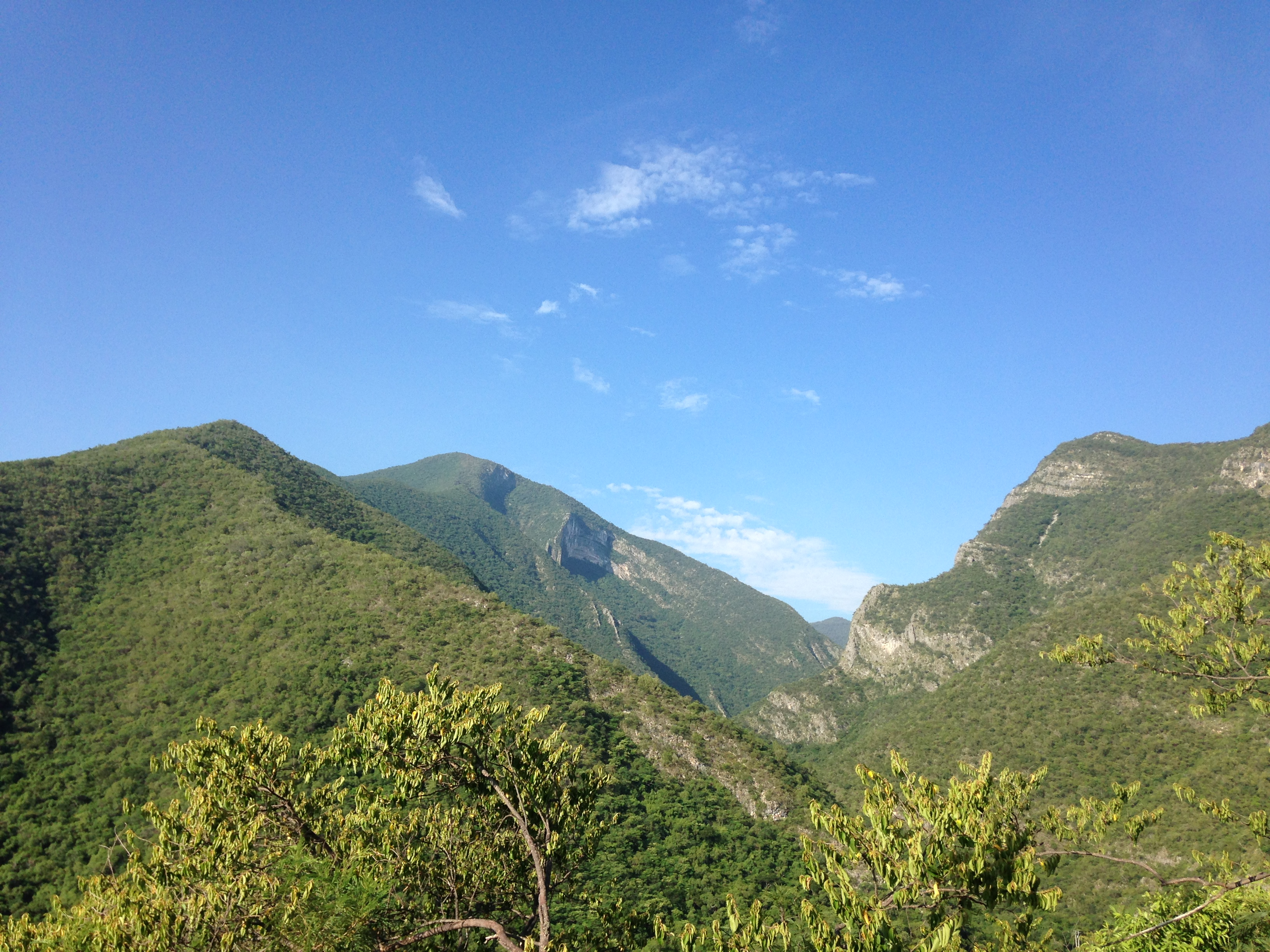
Overview of the Sierra Madre Oriental, the Mexican mountain range in which the "Monster of Aramberri" was discovered.

In the fall of 1985, a geology student from the Autonomous University of Nuevo León discovered a large concretion of fossils during an excursion in the Sierra Madre Oriental, approximately 1 km (0.62 mi) northwest of Aramberri, Nuevo León. During the exhumation, a second, equally large concretion was discovered by paleontologists. The site's inaccessibility and the 200 kg (440 lb) weight of the collected fossils prevented researchers from moving them immediately. The following year, the discovered material was finally moved over 2 km (1.2 mi) via fairly complex technical processes before reaching a road facilitating transport. Subsequently, the two large concretions were sent to the Faculty of Earth Sciences of the Autonomous University of Nuevo León, where the fossils are cataloged under the specimen number UANL-FCT-R2. The preparation of the first fossil concretion lasted two months, and upon completion, it was fixed vertically on a poured concrete base. The first concretion contained numerous postcranial elements, including seven pectoral vertebrae (transitional vertebrae between the cervical and thoracic regions), fragments of coracoids and a left scapula, ribs as well as gastralia. The second concretion contained a rostrum with teeth. These fossils were first mentioned in the scientific literature in 1988 by German geologist Walter Hähnel, one of the researchers who participated in their excavation. In his paper, he indicated that the discovery had been made stratigraphically within the La Casita Formation, a Late Jurassic geological formation more precisely dated to the late Kimmeridgian. Despite the fact that the specimen was discovered in marine sediments, Hähnel identified it as a carnivorous dinosaur with a length ranging between 10 and 15 m (33 and 49 ft).

The main fossils of the specimen were rediscovered during the autumn of 2000 and, based on their vertebral morphology, were reidentified as belonging to a large marine reptile of the family Pliosauridae. The discovery was announced in September 2001 by German paleontologist Eberhard Frey and colleagues in a brief publication, in which they gave this specimen the informal nickname of the "Monster of Aramberri". On 28 December 2002, the German magazine Der Spiegel published an article about the discovery, adopting this nickname and highlighting the completeness and remarkable size of the marine reptile. This coverage drew the attention of international media, to the point that the nickname has since been widely used by both journalists and scientists. A detailed study of the fossils, led by French paleontologist Marie-Céline Buchy and colleagues, was published in 2003. In the 2001 publication, the authors noted that the second concretion was not relocated to the university, and the 2003 study later noted it as lost. Based on the stratigraphic position of various ammonite specimens at the site, the authors of the latter study determined the Aramberri pliosaur was discovered in the La Caja Formation, which dates to the "middle" Kimmeridgian.

From 2001 to 2007, new expeditions carried out in the original locality by Mexican, French and German paleontologists helped by residents of the city, made it possible to exhume the caudal part of the specimen, and two thirds of the skeleton. Cranial fragments were also discovered, although most are unidentifiable. Field data even suggested that the fossil specimen would have been technically complete before the erosion of the skull and its exhumation for phosphorite. Ultimately, approximately 70% of the skeleton has been recovered. In 2003, in order to help paleontologists, the newly elected governor of Nuevo León sent a helicopter to transport a fossil block weighing a total of 450 kg (990 lb). During his campaign the following year, the governor approved and even completed the construction of a road leading to the excavation site. Once exhumed, most of the fossils were transferred to the Natural History Museum in Karlsruhe, Germany, for preparation. The Karlsruhe Museum could not accommodate more fossils due to the size of the animal, so the remaining material was transferred to the Desert Museum in Saltillo, Coahuila. When the material sent to Karlsruhe was prepared, they were returned to the Faculty of Earth Sciences of the Autonomous University of Nuevo León in 2012, where they have since been stored. Some fossils were temporarily exhibited in 2007 at the Mexican History Museum in Mexico City. The newly discovered and prepared fossils consisted of nine cervical vertebrae preserved on three blocks, additional dorsal vertebrae, ribs and gastralia, a femoral joint head, as well as an almost complete pelvic girdle. The cranial elements identified included a pterygoid, a jugal and part of a maxilla preserving a dental alveolus. The new fossils are still being prepared and should receive much more detailed descriptions in future work. In 2012, Mexican paleontologist Javier Aguilar Pérez suggested that the specimen should receive a skeletal mount formed from the fossils once their preparations are completed. Furthermore, he also expressed that new cranial fragments should be found in the field where the specimen was discovered, but no expedition has apparently been sent since.

== Description ==
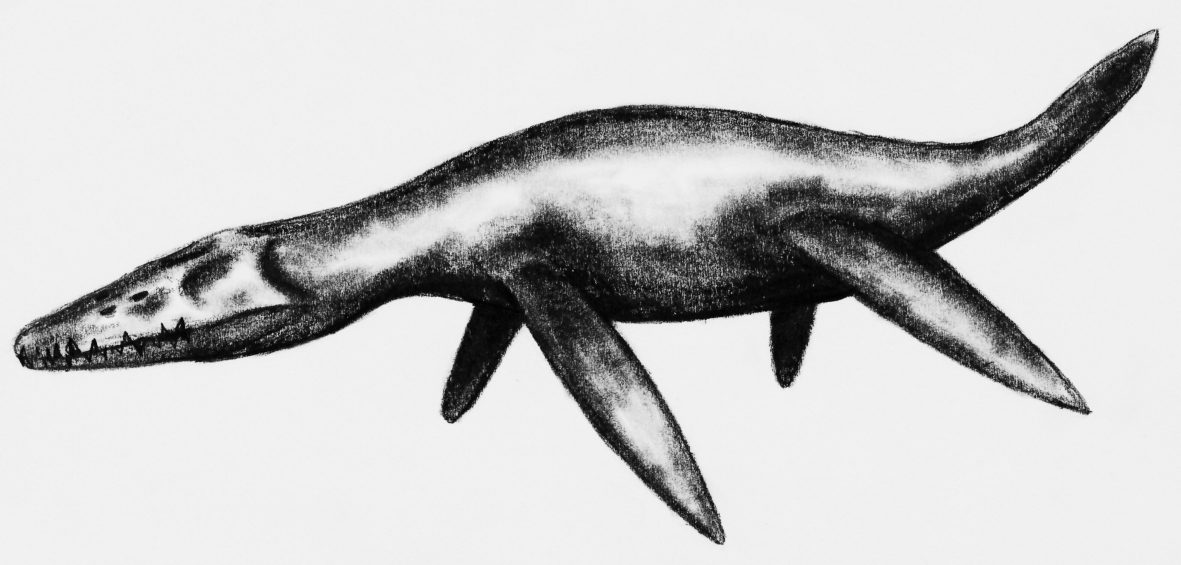
Life restoration

The Aramberri specimen is one of the most complete large pliosaurs ever discovered. Although the entire skeleton has not been described in detail, certain parts have received targeted descriptions. Plesiosaurs are usually categorized as belonging to the small-headed, long-necked "plesiosauromorph" morphotype or the large-headed, short-necked "pliosauromorph" morphotype, with the "Monster of Aramberri" belonging to the latter category. Like all plesiosaurs, it had a short tail, a massive trunk and two pairs of large flippers.

=== Size estimates ===
The "Monster of Aramberri", as its nickname suggests, is also one of the largest pliosaurs identified to date, but its size estimates have declined considerably over the years. Initial estimates placed the size at around 15 m (49 ft) long at least, although maximum estimates of up to 18 m (59 ft) with a body mass of 50 t (49 long tons; 55 short tons) were also proposed. In 2008, British paleontologist Adam S. Smith and his Irish colleague Gareth J. Dyke, citing the 2003 paper, gave a maximum length of 17 m (56 ft). In his 2009 thesis, Australian paleontologist Colin McHenry criticized the initial interpretations, which he found very exaggerated. Comparing the Aramberri specimen with the fossil material attributed to the Australian pliosaurid Kronosaurus, he reduced its size to between 11.7 and 12.2 m (38 and 40 ft) for a body mass of between 14.9 and 17.8 t (14.7 and 17.5 long tons; 16.4 and 19.6 short tons). In 2014, Frey and Wolfgang Stinnesbeck increased the length of the specimen slightly to between 12 and 14 m (39 and 46 ft). (Note: Earlier in the work, the same paleontologists set the size of this specimen at 15 m (49 ft) long like the majority of previous estimates.) In 2021, German paleontologists Frederik Spindler and Martin Mattes further reduced the size of this specimen to between 10 and 11 m (33 and 36 ft) long. In 2024, Chinese paleontologist Ruizhe Jackevan Zhao did not give a precise estimate of the measurements of the specimen. He suggested instead, based on vertebral dimensions, that it would have been similar in size to Pliosaurus funkei, which according to his model was approximately 9.8 m (32 ft) long with a body mass of 12 t (12 long tons; 13 short tons). The same year, Australian biologist Joel H. Gayford and his colleagues estimated that the animal would have reached approximately 10.7 m (35 ft) in length.

=== Skull ===
Relatively few of the animal's cranial bones have been discovered, and some of them have been lost, such as the rostrum and teeth. However, using one of the photographs presented in Hähnel's 1988 publication, Buchy and colleagues gave some comments in their first re-examination of the specimen in 2003. The rostrum is 60 cm (24 in) long and has three broken teeth. The teeth are described as massive, reaching about 5.5 cm (2.2 in) in diameter and being bicarinate (possessing two sharp edges). The fossil also contains an additional tooth probably coming from an opposite jaw. Therefore, it is uncertain whether the rostrum represents a dentary (one bone of the mandible), a maxilla or premaxilla (two bones of the upper jaw). Based on a mandible of a large pliosaur preserved at the Oxford University Museum of Natural History in England, the authors estimated that the "Monster of Aramberri" had a mandible and a skull up to 3 m (9.8 ft) long. The animal's teeth were conical in shape and the largest ones would have reached 20 cm (7.9 in) in length.

=== Postcranial skeleton ===
Much of the postcranial material remains undescribed as its preparation is ongoing. However, much of the material initially discovered and some fossils exhumed and subsequently prepared have been described. The front and back parts of the centra are slightly convex. They are pulley-shaped and vary in length from 9 to 10.5 cm (3.5 to 4.1 in). The neural spines of the vertebrae are quadrangular in shape in lateral view, reaching 20 cm (7.9 in) high with a length ranging from 5 to 8 cm (2.0 to 3.1 in). The neural tubes are oval in shape, reaching 8 to 10 cm (3.1 to 3.9 in) high and 2 to 3 cm (0.79 to 1.18 in) wide. The preserved proximal parts of the ribs measure up to 20 cm (7.9 in), but their state of preservation prevents further description of their morphology. The few ribs associated with the vertebrae have a curved dorsal margin. The femoral head of the "Monster of Aramberri" measures 45 cm (18 in) wide; for comparison, a specimen of Liopleurodon measuring 5 m (16 ft) long has a femoral head which only reaches 14 cm (5.5 in). The gastralia have deep, almost circular grooves that are irregularly spaced. These features are not bite marks, and they could prove to be a diagnostic trait of the animal in future studies.

== Classification ==
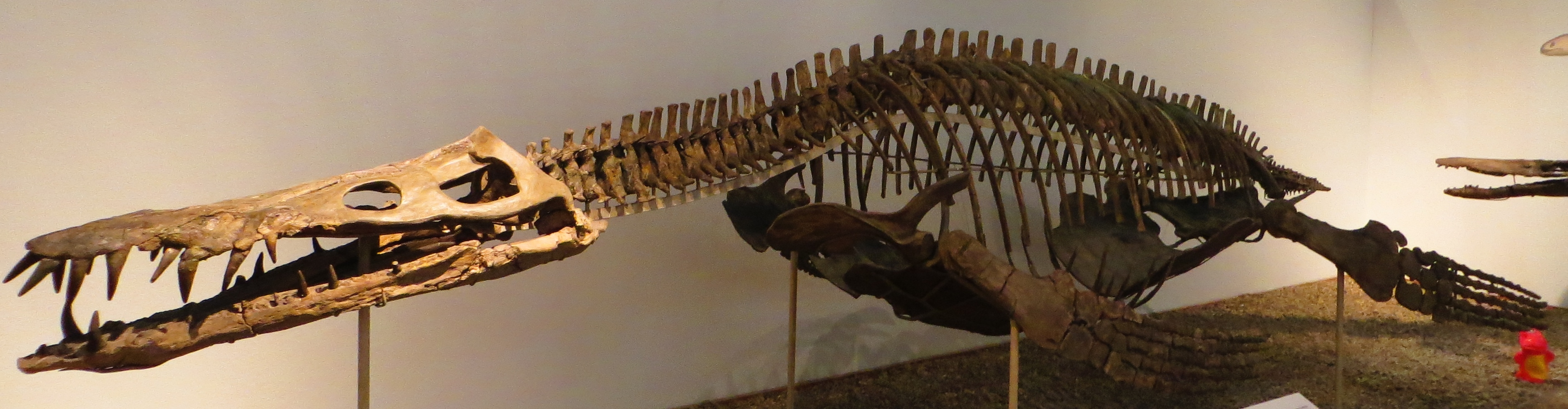
Mounted skeleton of the thalassophonean Liopleurodon, a pliosaurid regularly compared to the "Monster of Aramberri".

The "Monster of Aramberri" was initially described as a large dinosaur by Hähnel in 1988 without more precise classifications, its carnivorous nature suggesting a probable theropod. In the early 2000s, paleontologists determined that it was actually a pliosaur belonging to the family Pliosauridae. According to Buchy et al. (2003), its affiliation is based on the presence of two vertebral characteristics unique to this group. The first feature is the presence of foramina on the ventral side of each pulley-shaped vertebra. The second is the rib joints on the lateral side of some vertebrae located near the neural arches (upper/dorsal part of the vertebrae), typical of the pectoral vertebrae of plesiosaurs. The lack of proper cranial diagnosis and remaining undescribed fossils prevent it from being assigned to any European pliosaurid taxon.

In 2013, British paleontologist Roger B. J. Benson and his American colleague Patrick S. Druckenmiller named a new clade within Pliosauridae, Thalassophonea. This clade included the "classic", short-necked pliosaurids while excluding the earlier, long-necked, more gracile forms. Although no study addressing its phylogenetic position has yet been published, the "Monster of Aramberri" has since been considered as a large representative of the group. In 2014, Frey and Stinnesbeck provided a brief description of the Aramberri pliosaur and commented on its hypothetical affinities within the pliosaurid family. The small size of the flippers relative to the body of the animal indicates that the specimen was related to Kronosaurus. The group that currently includes Kronosaurus, known as Brachaucheninae, lived during the Cretaceous, whereas the Aramberri specimen dates to the Late Jurassic. Although Frey and Stinnesbeck later proposed this relationship in 2014, McHenry had already concluded in 2009 that the specimen was not closely related.

== Paleobiology ==
=== Ontogeny ===
In their 2003 study, Buchy and her colleagues noted that the seventh neural arch is not fused with the vertebrae, while the other neural arches were too incomplete to allow for similar observations. Plesiosaur specimens with neural arches not fused to the vertebrae are generally seen as juveniles, and the authors therefore considered the Aramberri specimen to be one as well. However, Buchy questioned this interpretation in 2007, citing that very few pliosaur fossils have been found with neural arches fused to the vertebrae, and that these were most likely juvenile traits carried over into adulthood. Many subsequent works shared identical conclusions. In 2014, based on these observations, Stinnesbeck and Frey interpreted the specimen as a subadult. Ten years later, Zhao, sharing the same observations, considered the specimen as an adult due to its large size.

=== Bite marks ===
Some cranial fragments of the Aramberri pliosaur, the jugal and the pterygoid, show bite marks suggesting that the specimen was attacked at the back of the head. The bite mark on the pterygoid indicates the attacking tooth had a crown estimated between 4 and 7 cm (1.6 and 2.8 in), suggesting a total length of the tooth of approximately 30 cm (12 in). Despite the significant injury, the pterygoid shows the presence of a callus, suggesting that the animal may have survived the incident. Conversely, the jugal was perforated by a tooth two-thirds the size of the one that struck the pterygoid, but which was probably fatal because there are no signs of healing. The animal that injured or killed the Aramberri pliosaur would probably have been larger, but the authors did not give estimates of its size in order to avoid speculations.

=== Stomach contents ===
Within the trunk region, the Aramberri specimen shows what appear to be poorly preserved bones, possibly from an ichthyosaur, that exhibit acid etching. The ichthyosaur in question would likely have been the specimen's last meal, though further study is required for confirmation.

== Paleoecology ==
The La Caja Formation, where the "Monster of Aramberri" was discovered, was a calm marine environment of shallow depth estimated between 150 and 300 m (490 and 980 ft), although the proximity of an island is attested by plant deposits probably torn away during rare storms. The presence of this large pliosaurid in the region supports the existence of a connection between the northern Tethyan domain where most of the fossils were found, and the epicontinental seas which covered South America at that time. The formation, dating from the "middle" Kimmeridgian, contains numerous invertebrate fossils, ammonites being the most abundant. Other invertebrates present include belemnites, bivalves, brachiopods, serpulids, radiolarians, and calpionellids. Fossil remains of fish are also known. The formation contains a number of other marine reptiles from various groups. Among the plesiosaurs, in addition to the "Monster of Aramberri", two other additional specimens of indeterminate pliosaurids are known. Apart from these three pliosaurids, the only known plesiosaurian is a possible elasmosaurid also noted as indeterminate. Thalattosuchians include one unattributed specimen and Cricosaurus saltillensis. The unattributed specimen was also discovered during the excavation of the Aramberri pliosaur. The ichthyopterygians known from the La Caja Formation include an indeterminate specimen as well as the ophthalmosaurid Parrassaurus.

== In popular culture ==
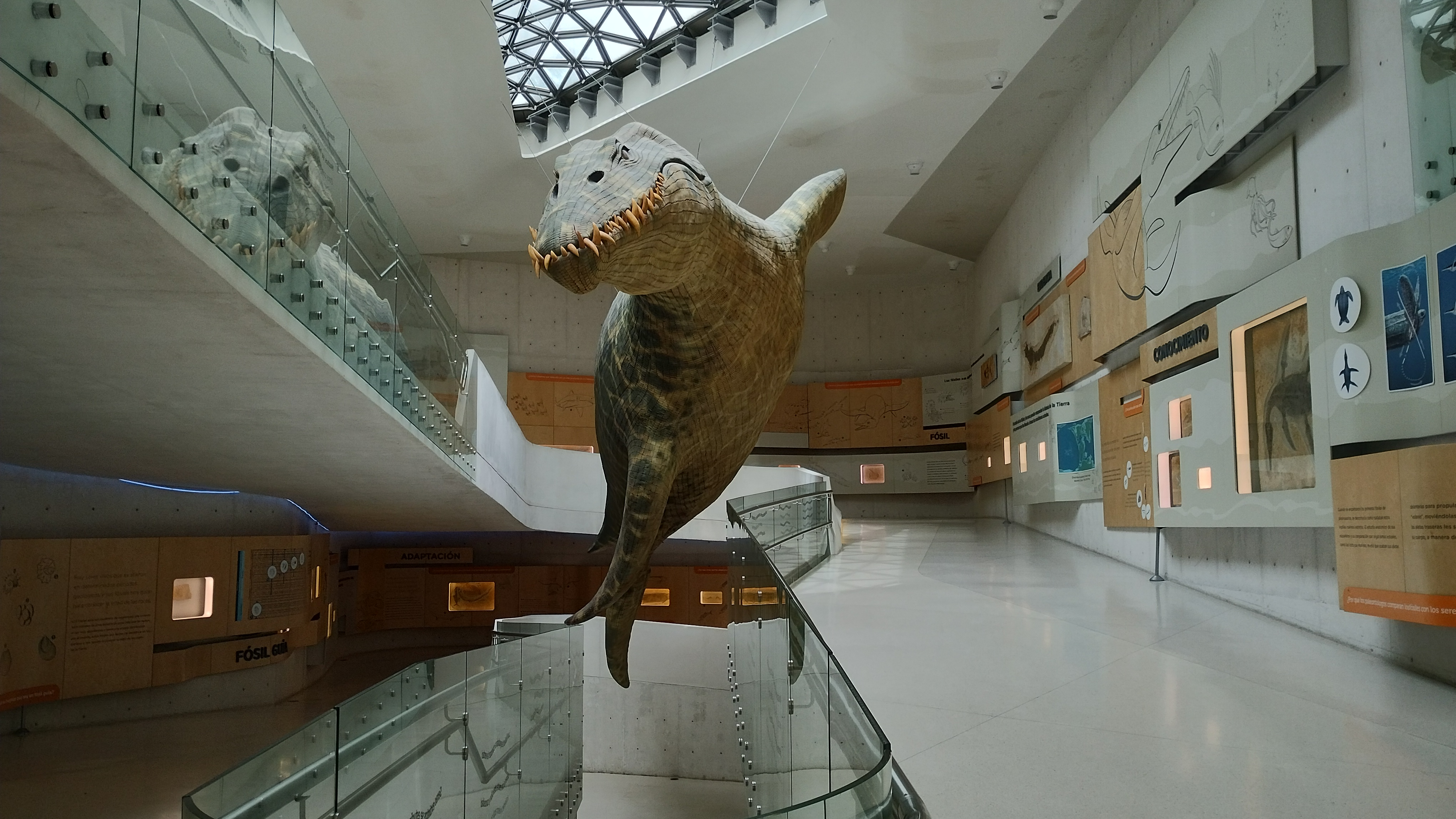
Life-sized restoration of the "Monster of Aramberri" in the Papalote Museo del Niño.

In the 1999 BBC documentary series Walking with Dinosaurs, Liopleurodon was depicted as reaching 25 m (82 ft) in length and weighing 150 metric tons (165.3 short tons). In the official companion book Walking with Dinosaurs: The Evidence published in 2000, British paleontologists David Martill and Darren Naish stated that the main inspiration was the vertebra discovered from the Oxford Clay and housed in the Peterborough Museum and Art Gallery, which they estimated to have belonged to a pliosaur between 17 and 20 m (56 and 66 ft) long, and claimed that "specimens of similar size" are known from other unspecified museum collections, though it is unstated whether the Aramberri pliosaur was one of these. The 2002 BBC press release reported that the "Monster of Aramberri" belonged to Liopleurodon and linked it with the depiction of the giant Liopleurodon from Walking with Dinosaurs, and the 2006 encyclopedia The Complete Guide to Prehistoric Life accompanying the Walking with... stated that Liopleurodon possibly lived in Central America, likely in reference to this specimen. However, a 2003 study did not explicitly recognize the Aramberri specimen as a representative of Liopleurodon, though extrapolated the tentative body size of the specimen from this genus, and the largest known specimen of Liopleurodon is currently thought to have reached 8.09 m (26.5 ft) in length. Some authors humorously referred to this tendency to exaggerate the size of Liopleurodon as "godzillaisation".

In 2017, a 18 m (59 ft) life-sized restoration of the "Monster of Aramberri" was created based on the dimensions of the preserved fossils. It has since been exhibited at the Papalote Museo del Niño in Monterrey.

== See also ==
- List of informally named Mesozoic reptiles
- Timeline of plesiosaur research
