= Hecker =

Hecker may refer to:

- Hecker (surname)
- Hecker, Illinois
- Hecker uprising in Baden
- Hecker (motorcycle), a former German motorcycle manufacturer
- Hecker Pass, California

== See also ==
- Hacker (disambiguation)
- Heckert, a surname
