= Desert Museum =

Desert Museum may refer to:

- Desert Museum (Mexico), in Saltillo, Coahuila
- Arizona-Sonora Desert Museum, Arizona, USA
- High Desert Museum, Oregon, USA
- Palm Springs Art Museum, formerly the Palm Springs Desert Museum, California, USA
