= Kranosaura =

Kranosaura Temporal range: Late Triassic, 220–208.5 Ma

Scientific classification
- Kingdom: Animalia
- Phylum: Chordata
- Class: Reptilia
- Clade: Archosauriformes
- Clade: †Protopyknosia
- Genus: †Kranosaura; Nesbitt et al., 2021
- Species: †K. kuttyi

Binomial name
- †Kranosaura kuttyi Nesbitt et al., 2021

Extinct genus of archosauriform reptile

Kranosaura is an extinct genus of archosauriform reptile from the Late Triassic Upper Maleri Formation of India. It contains a single species, K. kuttyi.

== Discovery and naming ==
The genus is based on two domes of 9 centimetres (3.5 in) long, discovered by Tharavat S. Kutty in the 1990s and described in 2021 by Nesbitt et al.

== Description ==
It had an unusually domed head reminiscent of the later pachycephalosaurian dinosaurs in an example of convergent evolution, similar to that of Triopticus. Kranosaura was the sister taxon to Triopticus, with which it forms the clade Protopyknosia.
