= Syntomiprosopus =

Syntomiprosopus Temporal range: Late Triassic, Norian ~219 Ma

Scientific classification
- Domain: Eukaryota
- Kingdom: Animalia
- Phylum: Chordata
- Class: Reptilia
- Clade: Archosauromorpha
- Clade: Crocopoda
- Clade: Archosauriformes
- Genus: †Syntomiprosopus; Heckert et al., 2021
- Species: †S. sucherorum

Binomial name
- †Syntomiprosopus sucherorum Heckert et al., 2021

Extinct genus of archosauriform reptile

Syntomiprosopus (meaning "short face") is an extinct genus of archosauriform, possibly a crocodylomorph from the Late Triassic period of Arizona. The type and only known species is S. sucherorum. Syntomiprosopus was unusually short-snouted, comparable to the Late Cretaceous notosuchian Simosuchus, and is regarded as an example of convergent evolution between Triassic stem-archosaurs and Cretaceous archosaurs.

== Discovery and naming ==
Fossils of Syntomiprosopus were discovered at a locality in the Downs' Quarry located in eastern Arizona, just above the "Placerias Quarry" and just below the principal horizon of the Downs' Quarry. The fossils were recovered during joint excavations by the North Carolina Museum of Natural Sciences (NCSM) and Appalachian State University (ASU) between 2013 and 2015 as part of a series of excavations that had begun in 2010. The quarry is part of the expansive Late Triassic Chinle Formation, and has been radiometrically dated to have been deposited at a maximum age of approximately 219.39 ± 0.16 million years old.

The holotype specimen (NCSM 29059–29060) consists of two associated pieces of a complete right mandible, along with the paratypes NCSM 26729 (an articular complex from the rear of the left jaw), NCSM 26730 (the front of a left mandible), NCSM 27677 (the middle portion of a left mandible), NCSM 27678 (another left articular complex) and NCSM 29061 (a right articular complex). These belong to at least two, but possibly up to four individuals. Part of the back of a skull and braincase (NCSM 27679) found associated with the jaw material may also belong to Syntomiprosopus, as well as some sacral vertebrae (NCSM 27991 and NCSM 27992), but they cannot be definitively referred to Syntomiprosopus on anatomical grounds. However, because there are no other similarly sized vertebrates in the fossil bed that it can be referred to, has identical preservation, and that it does not match any previously known animal from the Downs' Quarry, Heckert and colleagues were confident in referring the skull to Syntomiprosopus.

Heckert and colleagues named Syntomiprosopus from the Greek prefix syntomi- ("short") and prosopus ("face") to refer to its characteristically short jaws. The specific name sucherorum is in honour of Scott ("Major") and Karen Sucher, who had voluntarily spent 22 years supporting and aiding Heckert and his colleagues, including participating in the excavations at Downs' Quarry that discovered the remains of Syntomiprosopus.

== Description ==
Syntomiprosopus is only known by bones of the lower jaw and potentially part of the braincase. However, the lower jaw is distinct amongst Late Triassic reptiles, being short and almost as broad as they are long, meeting with a U-shaped curve at their tips. The lower jaw is robust, approximately 2.5x as long as high, and is twice as deep at its end as the tips. They have a coarse and roughly textured surface with irregularly placed pits and grooves without any clear pattern.

Syntomiprosopus has very few teeth, with the smallest specimen having only eight active tooth positions and the largest specimen only four. The teeth are divided into a set 2—4 front teeth that are procumbent (angled forwards), a large canine-like (caniniform) tooth, followed by up to 3 small postcanine teeth, the smallest set in the toothrow. In larger specimens, the tooth sockets for these postcanines are resorbed into the jaw bone, and the teeth are lost. The teeth themselves are asymmetrical, with a flat outer surface and bulbous inner surface, and appear to have large denticles (serrations) along their edges.

== Classification ==
Syntomiprosopus is evidenced to be an archosauriform, based on the presence of the mandibular fenestra and serrated teeth. However, no characteristics are identifiable in the lower jaw to identify its affinities beyond Archosauriformes. Notably, the rugose mandibular symphysis, large caniniform tooth, short prearticular, and the angular that is well exposed on the internal side of the jaw are all characteristics variably found in crocodylomorphs, although the first two traits are also found elsewhere in archosauriforms.

The braincase and back of the skull, if correctly referred to Syntomiprosopus, may further indicate affinities to early crocodylomorphs. Crocodylomorph characteristics of this skull include a sagittal crest along the midline (formed by fused, raised parietal bones), the rear edge of the parietals diverge at almost 90° from the midline of the skull, a contact between the laterosphenoid and parabasisphenoid of the braincase, and a possible contact between the prootic bone of the middle ear and quadrate bone on the external surface of the skull.

However, the partial skull also lacks characteristics found in more derived crocodylomorphs (such as deep hollow on the underside of the basioccipital, or on the parabasisphenoid)) and preserves features lost in more derived crocodylomorphs (such as the entrances for the internal carotid arteries being placed high on the skull and modifications to the middle ear). This combination of traits indicate that if Syntomiprosopus is indeed a crocodylomorph, it must be a relatively basal early-diverging species, less derived than Sphenosuchus.

== Palaeobiology ==
The smaller specimen of Syntomiprosopus preserves more open tooth sockets, four in front, a canine-like tooth, and three postcanine teeth behind. The larger specimen only preserves the three front teeth and the caniniform, with the remaining tooth sockets behind being either fully or partially resorbed into the jaw bone. This suggests that Syntomiprosopus lost these teeth as it matured, losing close to half of its dentition. Some archosaurs are known to decrease their tooth counts as they mature (e.g. tyrannosaurids and possibly modern crocodylians), however, only Limusaurus shows a similarly drastic loss in teeth between juveniles and adults (whereby juveniles have sharp, pointed teeth that are lost for a beak in adults).

== Palaeoecology ==
The only other fossils recovered from the same layers as Syntomiprosopus are of indeterminate phytosaurs. However, the layers immediately below and above contain fossils of the herbivorous armoured aetosaurs Desmatosuchus, Calyptosuchus and Tecovasuchus, as well as a dicynodont (likely Placerias) and an unidentified allokotosaur.
