= Heckert =

Heckert is a surname. Notable people with the surname include:

- Michael Heckert (born 1950), German painter
- Scot Heckert, member of the West Virginia House of Delegates
- Tom Heckert Jr. (born 1967), American football coach and executive
- Tom Heckert Sr. (born 1938), American football coach, scout, and executive

== See also ==
- Hecker (surname)
