= Cúpido Formation =

Geologic formation in Mexico

- Stratigraphic range: Hauterivian–Aptian
- Type: Formation
- Underlies: La Peña Formation
- Overlies: Taraises Formation
- Thickness: Approximately 600 metres

Lithology
- Primary: Limestone
- Other: Evaporites, solution breccias

Location
- Region: Chihuahua
- Country: Mexico

Type section
- Named for: Cañón Cúpido, Nuevo León.

The Cúpido Formation is a geologic formation in northern Mexico. It preserves fossils dating back to the Cretaceous period.

== See also ==
- List of fossiliferous stratigraphic units in Mexico
