= Protopyknosia =

Protopyknosia Temporal range: Late Triassic, ~229–211 Ma Carnian-Norian

Scientific classification
- Kingdom: Animalia
- Phylum: Chordata
- Class: Reptilia
- Clade: Archosauriformes
- Clade: †Protopyknosia; Nesbitt et al., 2021

Genera
- †Kranosaura; †Triopticus

Extinct clade of reptiles

Protopyknosia is an extinct clade of archosauriform reptiles from the Late Triassic of India and the United States. First identified by Sterling Nesbitt et al. in 2021, the clade contains two genera: Kranosaura and Triopticus. Members of Protopyknosia characteristically have an unusually domed head reminiscent of the later pachycephalosaurian dinosaurs in an example of convergent evolution. The clade was defined by Nesbitt et al. 2021 as the "most inclusive clade containing Triopticus primus, but not Passer domesticus (the house sparrow), Triceratops horridus, Alligator mississippiensis (the American alligator), Sphenodon punctatus (the tuatara), Heloderma suspectum (the Gila monster), or Chrysemys picta (the painted turtle)".
