= Taraises Formation =

Geologic formation in Mexico

- Stratigraphic range: Berriasian–Hauterivian
- Type: Formation
- Underlies: Cupido Formation
- Overlies: La Caja Formation, La Casita Formation
- Thickness: 10 m. - 363 m.

Lithology
- Primary: Marl
- Other: Limestone

Location
- Region: Coahuila, Nuevo León, Zacatecas, San Luis Potósi
- Country: Mexico

Type section
- Named for: Cañón Taraises
- Named by: R. W. Imlay

The Taraises Formation is a geologic formation in northern Mexico. It preserves fossils dating back to the Early Cretaceous, including ammonites.

== Paleobiota ==
- Acanthodiscus
- Bochianites
- Ceratotuberculus
- Distoloceras

== See also ==
- List of fossiliferous stratigraphic units in Mexico
