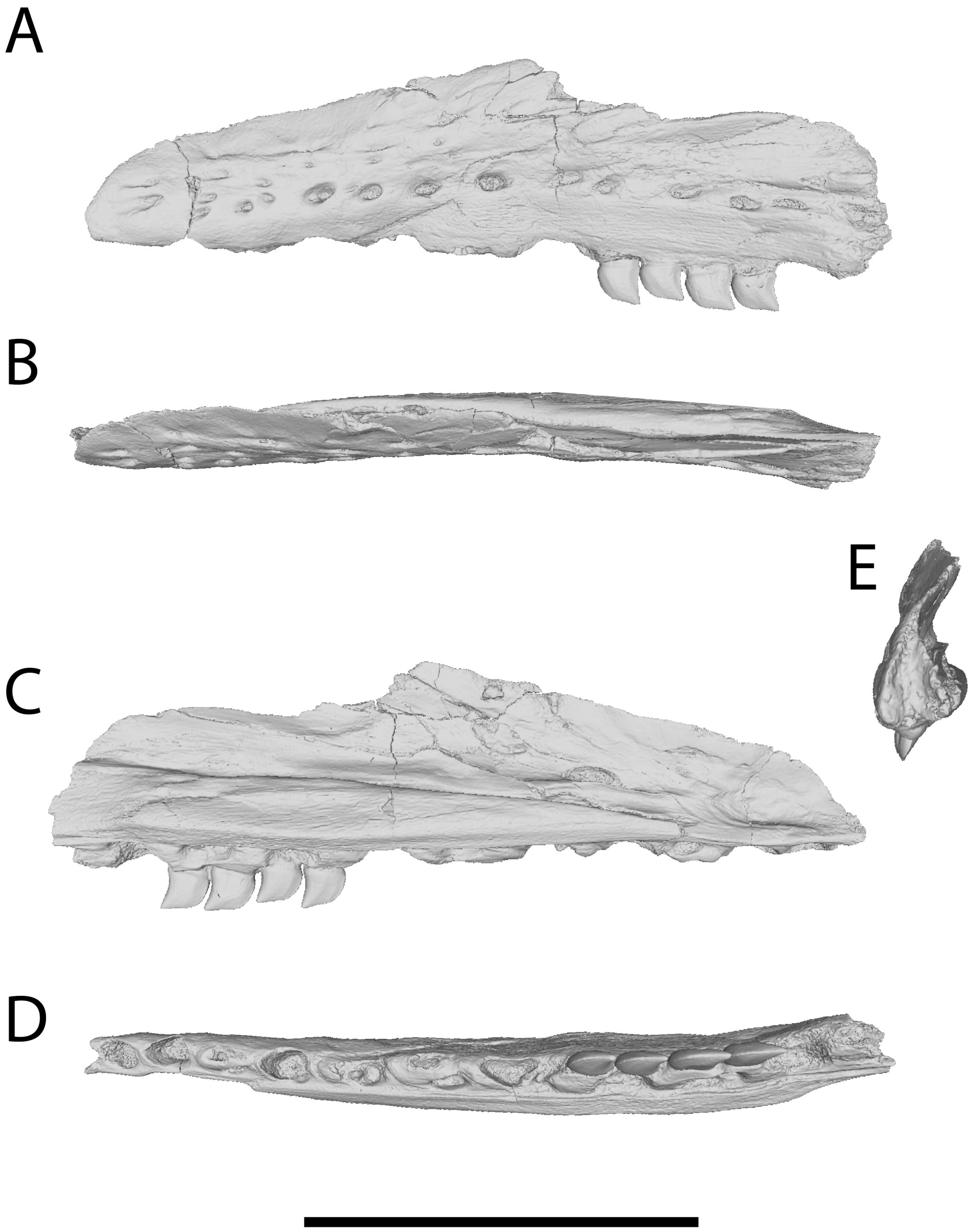
- CT rendering of the holotype maxilla

Scientific classification
- Kingdom: Animalia
- Phylum: Chordata
- Class: Reptilia
- Order: Squamata
- Clade: †Mosasauria
- Family: †Mosasauridae
- Subfamily: †Mosasaurinae
- Genus: †Xenodens; Longrich et al., 2021
- Species: †X. calminechari

Binomial name
- †Xenodens calminechari Longrich et al., 2021

= Xenodens =

Xenodens Temporal range: Late Cretaceous, late Maastrichtian

Extinct genus of lizards

Xenodens (from Greek and Latin for "strange tooth") is an extinct genus of mosasaurine mosasaurid known from the Late Cretaceous (Maastrichtian age) phosphate deposits in the Ouled Abdoun Basin of Morocco. The genus contains a single species, Xenodens calminechari, known from two isolated maxillae (upper jaw bones) with unusual saw-like teeth. While some researchers have expressed uncertainty regarding the authenticity of the holotype specimen, additional remains and CT scans have supported the original identifications.

== Discovery and naming ==
The Xenodens holotype specimen, MHNM.KHG.331, was acquired from a local farmer in the city of Ouled Bou Ali in Khouribga Province, Morocco. While the exact type locality cannot be precisely located due to the phosphate mine being active, examining the block of the original, unprepared matrix containing the holotype suggested that the specimen originate from the Sidi Chennane phosphate mine (Upper Couche III) of Oulad Abdoun Basin. The specimen consists of a left maxilla with four associated teeth and tooth replacement pits.

In 2021, Longrich and colleagues described Xenodens calminechari based on the specimen. The generic name combines the Ancient Greek word xénos (ξένος, 'strange'), and the Latin word dens ('tooth'). The specific name is derived from the Arabic word calminechari (کالمنشار), which means 'like a saw'.

In 2025, they referred another left maxilla specimen with eight associated teeth, MHNM.KHG.1117, to verify the authenticity of this taxon.

== Description ==
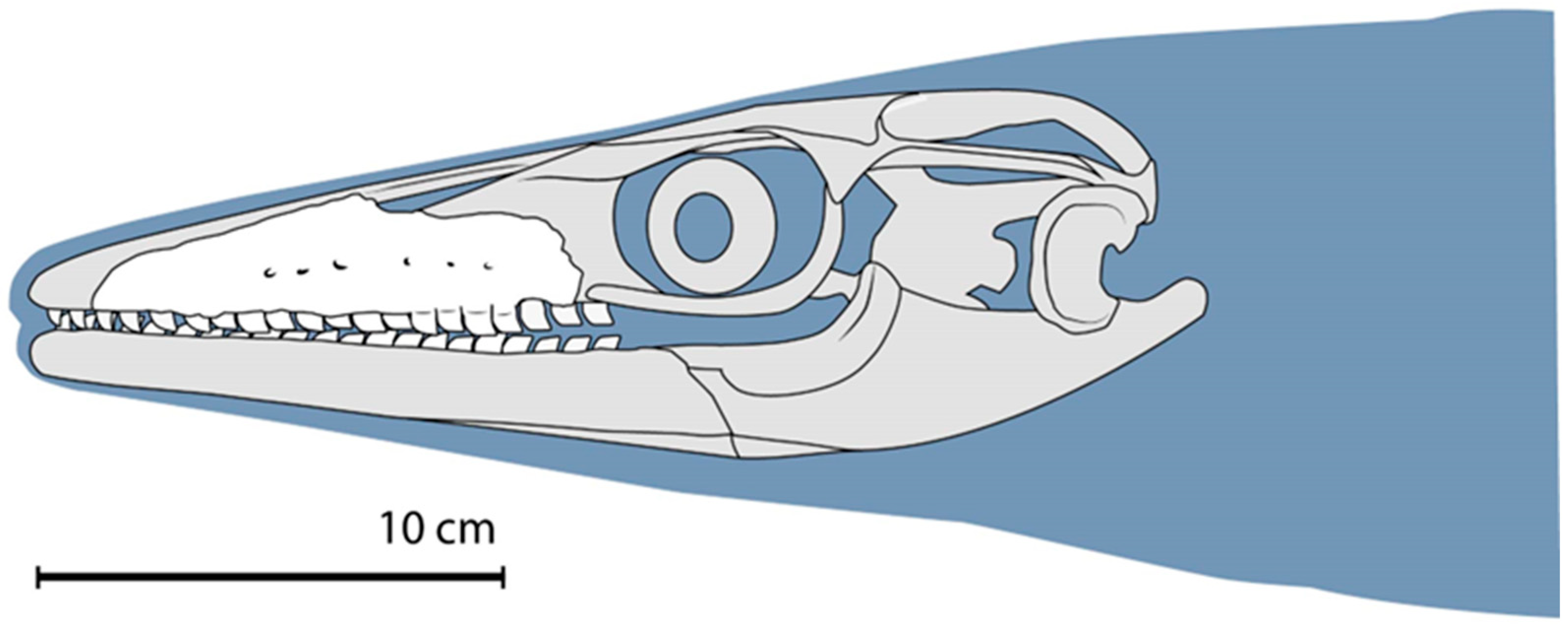
Reconstructed skull of Xenodens

In 2021, Longrich and colleagues described Xenodens as a member of the Mosasaurinae. They argued that it is likely most closely related to the durophagous Carinodens. Initial estimates suggested the fossil material could belong to an animal with a body length of around 1 meter (3.3 ft).

The species is characterized by its short, flattened, blade-like teeth that collectively form a set of saw-like jaws in this taxon. This is a strange feature otherwise unseen in any other tetrapod but convergent with the jaws of modern dogfish sharks and piranhas. Longrich et al. (2021) hypothesized that these similarities were indicative of a broad diet of cephalopods, crustaceans, fish, and scavenged marine reptiles in Xenodens.

== Controversy ==
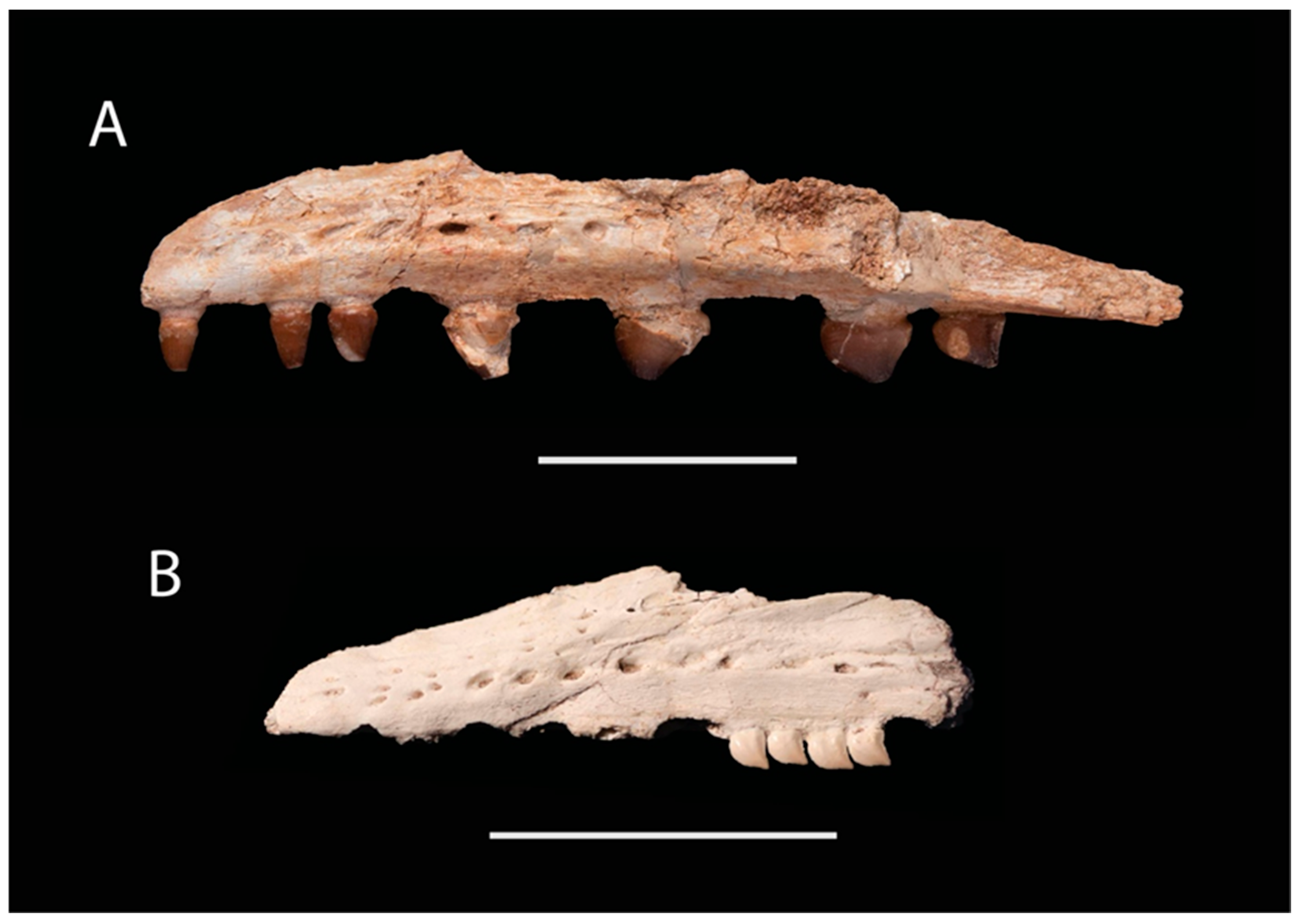
Comparison of the holotypes of Carinodens acrodon and Xenodens calminechari

In 2024, Sharpe, Powers & Caldwell reassessed the established holotype of Xenodens and argued that it represents a chimeric forged fossil. Their review suggested that the four teeth preserved in the specimen had been artificially added over two alveoli in the maxilla. The unusual morphology of the preserved teeth may result from intraspecific variation, as tooth shape can vary through ontogeny, so the possibility that the taxon represents an immature Carinodens cannot be precluded. As such, they interpreted the taxon as a nomen dubium in need of more detailed research based on CT scans to determine if the specimen is authentic. Moreover, Sharpe et al. criticised an insufficient degree of diligence in how Longrich et al. had treated the type material which local miners had extracted during an unsupervised commercial excavation.

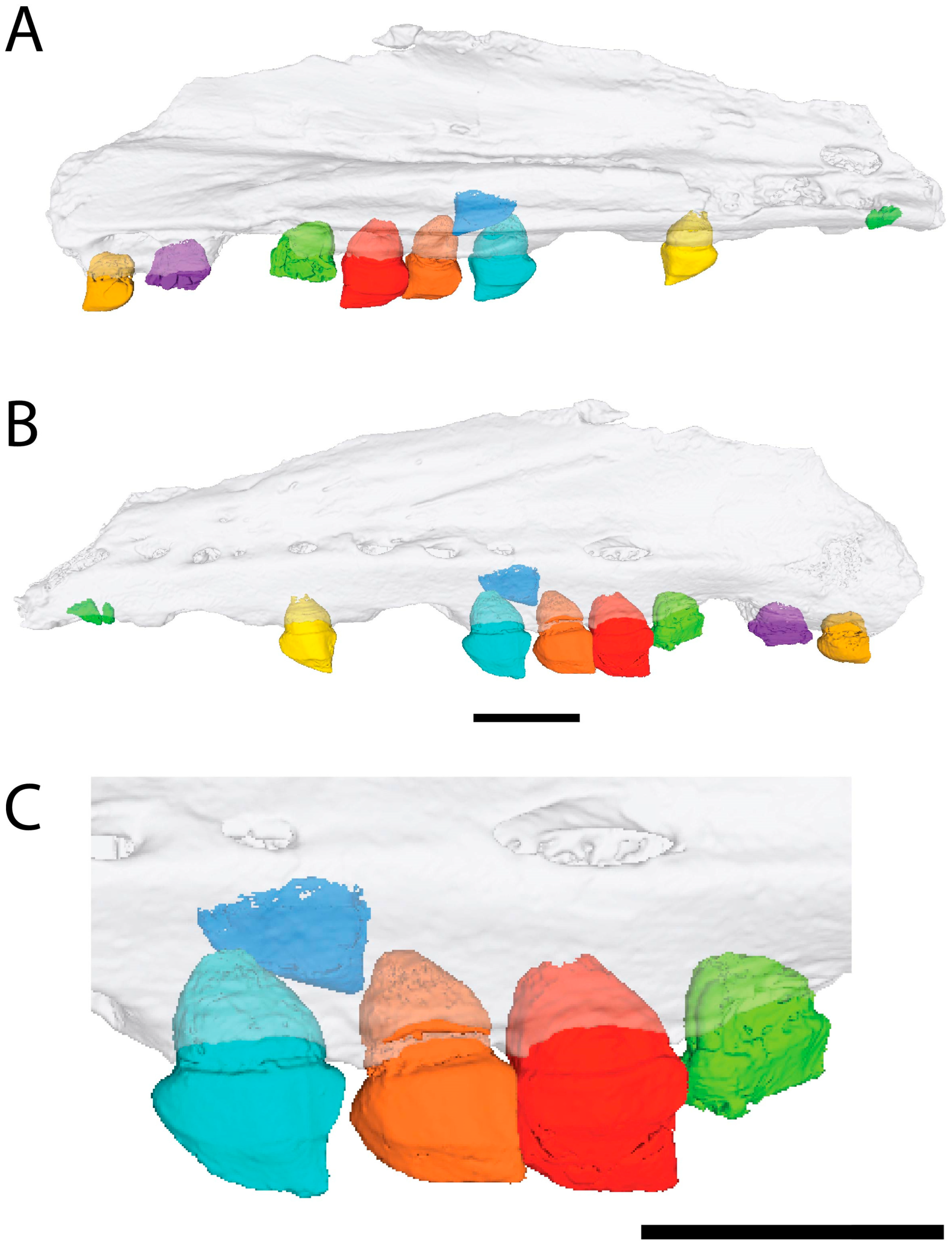
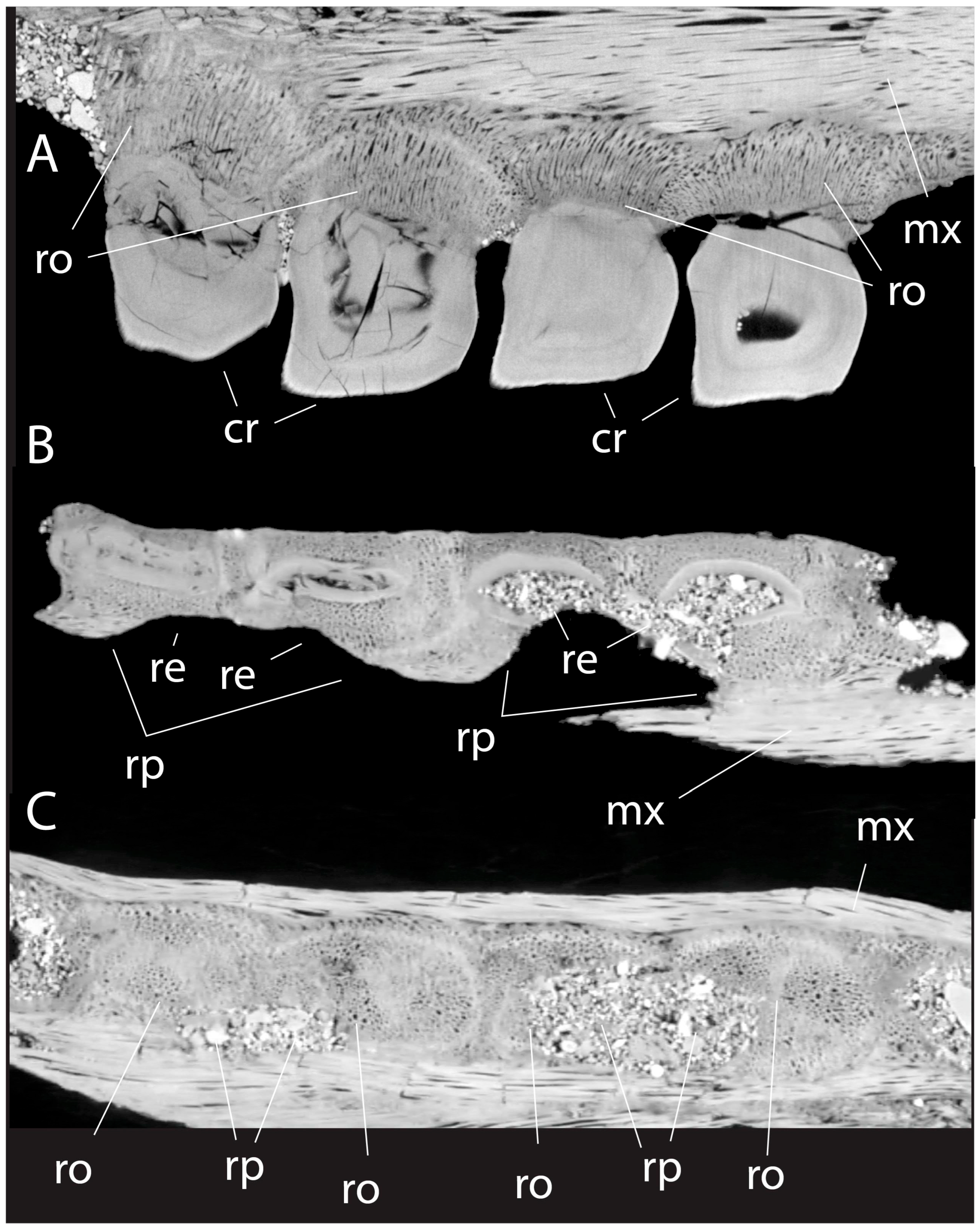
CT rendering of MHNM.KHG.1117, highlighting tooth crowns and roots (left) and slices of the CT scan of MHNM.KHG.331 with tooth crowns (cr), roots (ro), and replacement pits (rp) labeled

In 2025, Longrich and colleagues published a rebuttal based on CT scans of the holotype (MHNM.KHG.331) and referred specimen (MHNM.KHG.1117), and supported the interpretation of Xenodens as a valid, distinct taxon. They argued that the CT scans reveal a continuous connection between the tooth crown and associated tooth root tissues for each tooth, and an association of each tooth root with a replacement pit. They found no evidence of alteration in the CT scans to both the original phosphatic matrix and the holotype, though the alteration to the first tooth repair that "detached during preparation" is visible. The supposed "gummy" material suggested as possible evidence of forgery by Sharpe et al. (2024) is shown to be a paraloid B-72 layer used in preparation to cover the osteocementum (hard, mineralized tissue covering the lower tooth root) based on the cross-section observed through the CT scans. They also suggested that the maxilla and associated dentition of Carinodens acrodon differ significantly from those of Xenodens, indicating that it would require a major change in the maxilla shape to consider Xenodens as a juvenile Carinodens, and thus the proposed synonymy of both taxa are not likely.
