= Kazakhstanosaurus =

Kazakhstanosaurus Temporal range: Late Jurassic 150 Ma

Scientific classification
- Kingdom: Animalia
- Phylum: Chordata
- Class: Reptilia
- Order: †Ichthyosauria
- Family: †Ophthalmosauridae
- Genus: †Kazakhstanosaurus; Bolatovna and Makustovich, 2021

Type species
- †Kazakhstanosaurus efimovi Bolatovna and Makustovich, 2021

Species
- †Kazakhstanosaurus efimovi Bolatovna and Makustovich, 2021; †Kazakhstanosaurus shchuchkinensis Bolatovna and Makustovich, 2021

Extinct genus of undorosaurid ichthyosaur

Kazakhstanosaurus (meaning "Kazakhstan lizard") is an extinct genus of undorosaurid ichthyosaur from the Late Jurassic of Kazakhstan and Russia. Two species are known: the type, K. efimovi, and K. shchuchkinensis, both named and described in 2021.

== Discovery and naming ==
The holotype of K. efimovi was excavated by Vladimir M. Efimov between 1973 and 1976. In 2016, a group of school children under the guidance of Olga Subbotina discovered the holotype of Kazakhstanosaurus shchuchkinensis. The fossils of both species were prepared by Dzhamilya Yakupova. Both species were eventually named and described in 2021 by two papers, by Yakupova Bolatovna and Akhmemenov Maksutovich, and Jakulova, although a paper naming the genus Kazakhstanosaurus was earlier published in 2019. The name remained invalid due to the lack of a type species. The holotype was later put on display at Nazarbayev University, Kazakhstan.

== Description ==
Based on the known remains, K. efimovi was slightly larger than K. shchuchkinensis.

== Classification ==
Bolatovna and Makustovich (2021) found Kazakhstanosaurus to be the sister taxon to the contemporaneous Undorosaurus. It also was placed in the Undorosauridae in 2021 and was likely an ancestor of Undorosaurus itself.
