= Notapachemys =

Notapachemys Temporal range: Priabonian

Scientific classification
- Kingdom: Animalia
- Phylum: Chordata
- Class: Reptilia
- Order: Testudines
- Suborder: Cryptodira
- Superfamily: Testudinoidea
- Family: Geoemydidae
- Genus: †Notapachemys
- Species: †N. oglala

Binomial name
- †Notapachemys oglala Bourque, 2021

Extinct genus of turtles

Notapachemys is an extinct genus of geoemydid that lived during the Eocene.

== Distribution ==
Notapachemys oglala is known from the Late Eocene Chadron Formation of northwestern Nebraska.
