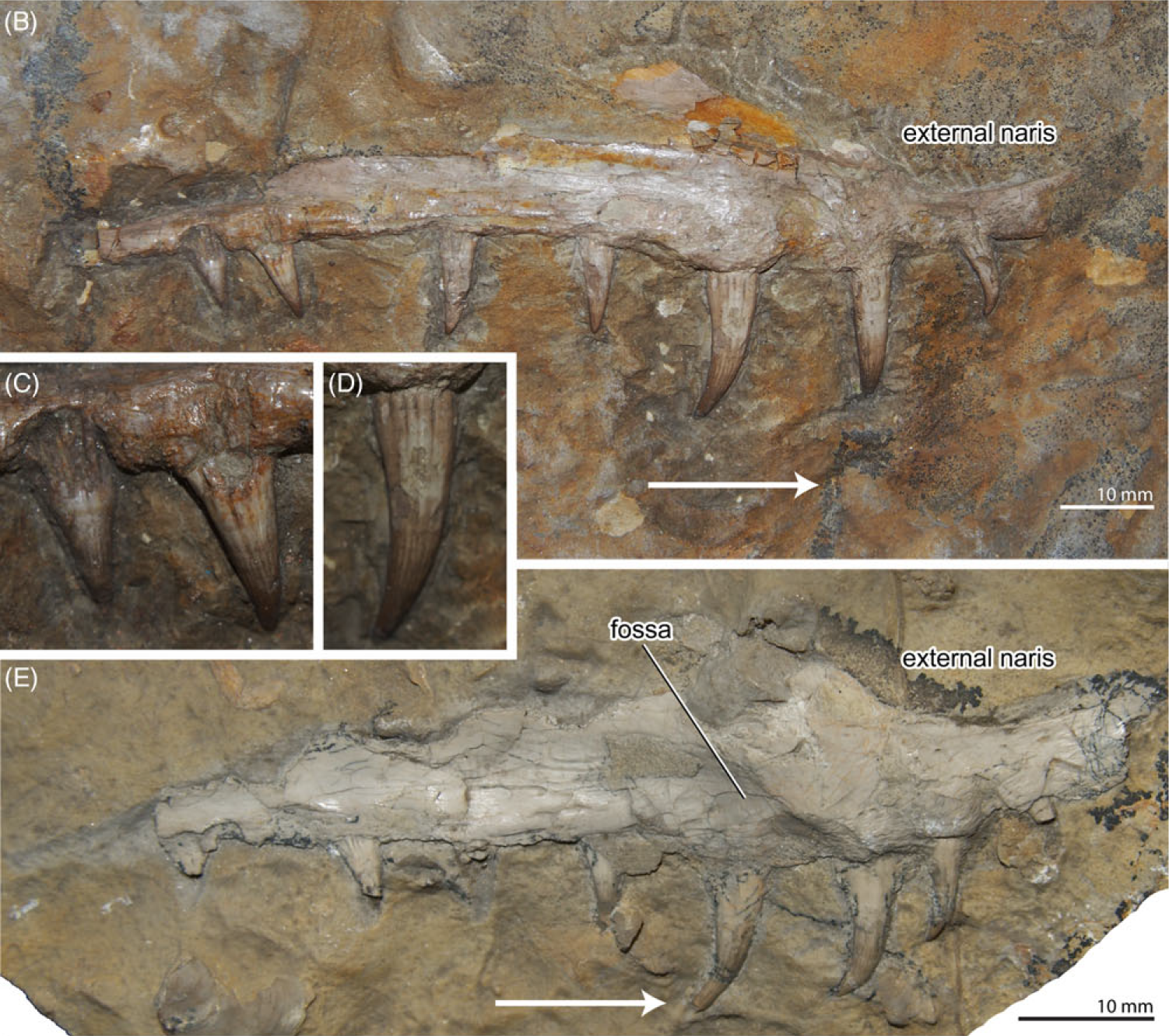
- Holotype (B–D) and referred (E) maxillae

Scientific classification
- Kingdom: Animalia
- Phylum: Chordata
- Class: Reptilia
- Superorder: †Sauropterygia
- Clade: †Eosauropterygia
- Family: †incertae sedis
- Genus: †Lamprosauroides; Schmidt, 1927
- Species: †L. goepperti

Binomial name
- †Lamprosauroides goepperti von Meyer, 1860

Synonyms
- Lamprosaurus von Meyer, 1860 (preoccupied)

= Lamprosauroides =

Lamprosauroides Temporal range: Middle Triassic, middle Anisian

Genus of extinct reptile

Lamprosauroides is an enigmatic dubious genus of possible sauropterygian reptile known from the Middle Triassic (Anisian age) Muschelkalk of Poland and possibly the Netherlands. The genus contains a single species, Lamprosauroides goepperti, known from several jaw bones. It is characterized by its large, fang-like teeth.

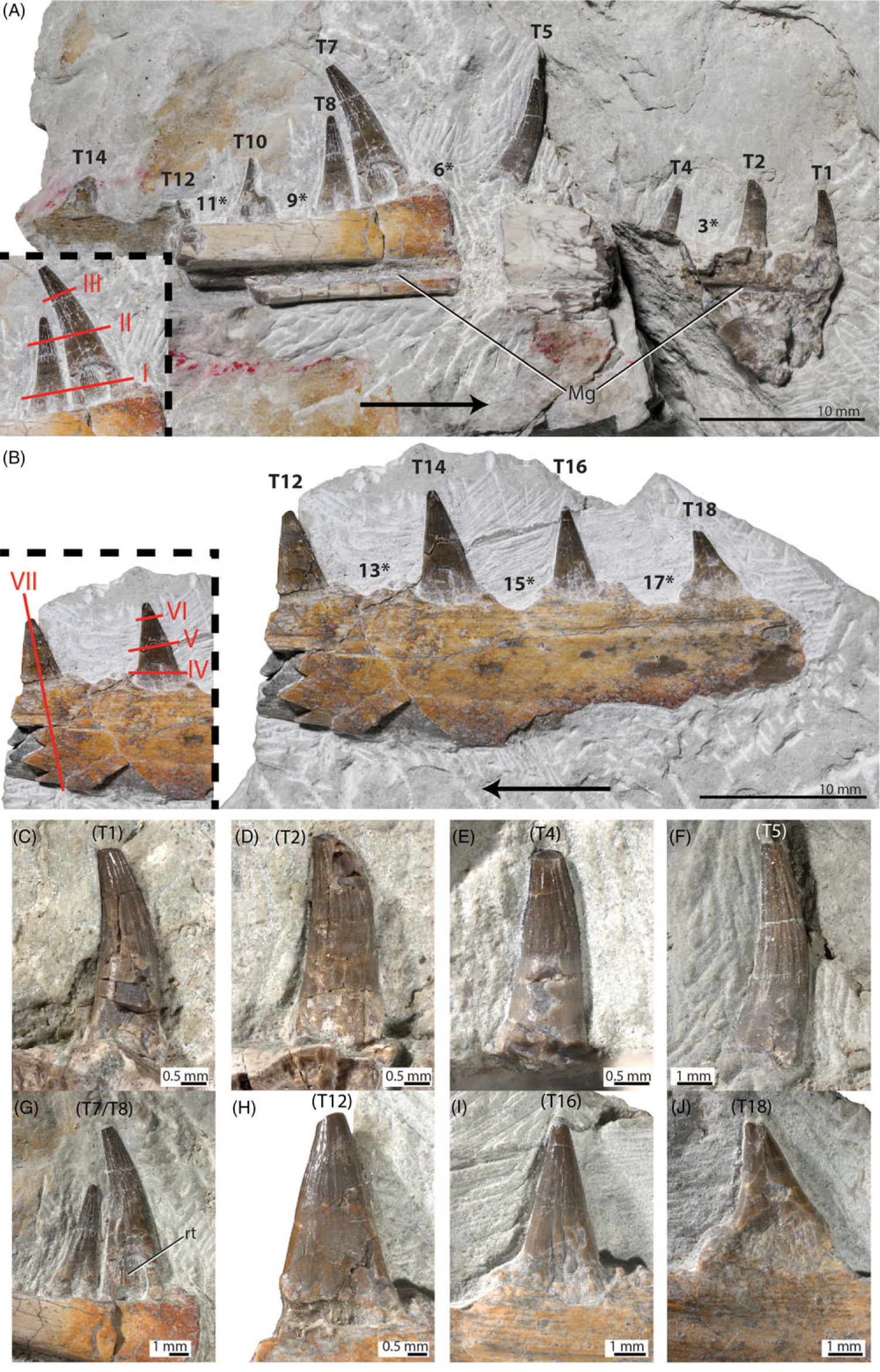
Dentary referred to cf. L. goepperti

In 1860, Hermann von Meyer described Lamprosaurus goepperti as a new genus and species based on fossils he identified as belonging to a nothosaur. Anton Schrammen later identified it as a cymatosaur in 1899. As the generic name Lamprosaurus was preoccupied by a skink named several years prior to von Meyer's publication (Lamprosaurus Hallowell, 1852), Karl Patterson Schmidt proposed the replacement genus name Lamprosauroides in 1927. Later researchers considered it to be a nomen dubium due to the absence of unique, diagnostic anatomical features. In 2021, Spiekman and Klein tentatively recognized Lamprosauroides as a eosauropterygian. They considered it to be most similar to Cymatosaurus, though still distinct from it, nothosauroids, and pistosauroids.

In their 2024 publication on the Chinese tanysaur Dinocephalosaurus, Spiekman and colleagues noted that the tooth arrangement of Lamprosauroides—slender and slightly recurved in the front and wider and straight toward the back—is similar to Dinocephalosaurus, as is the curved outline of the tooth row. Plicidentine (striations at the tooth base) is known from a mandible referred to cf. L. goepperti, a feature also seen in Dinocephalosaurus. The authors concluded that there was not currently enough evidence to regard Lamprosauroides as a trachelosaurid, but noted that its similarities to this Asian genus and approximately coeval age to the European Trachelosaurus were intriguing.
