= Auroroborealia =

Auroroborealia Temporal range: Norian

Scientific classification
- Domain: Eukaryota
- Kingdom: Animalia
- Phylum: Chordata
- Class: Reptilia
- Order: †Ichthyosauria
- Genus: †Auroroborealia; Zverkov et al., 2021
- Species: †A. incognita

Binomial name
- †Auroroborealia incognita Zverkov et al. 2021

Extinct genus of ichthyosaur

Auroroborealia is a small bodied euichthyosaurian ichthyosaur discovered on the New Siberian Islands in the Russian Arctic. The animal was likely similar in size to Hudsonelpidia, around 1 to 1.5 meters in length. Although the fragmentary nature doesn't allow to determine its exact ontogenetic state, other remains from the area suggest that it was simply a small-bodied taxon. It contains a single species, Auroroborealia incognita.

== Discovery and naming ==
The fossils of Auroroborealia were discovered by a joint expedition of the Geological Institute of the Russian Academy of Sciences and the Trofimuk Institute of Petroleum Geology and Geophysics, Siberian Branch of the Russian Academy of Sciences, during excavations in 2006 and 2009. These expeditions yielded a variety of ichthyosaurian remains from six stratigraphic levels ranging from the lower Carnian to middle Norian. Although most specimens were fragmentary, Zverkov et al. (2021) could nevertheless differentiate between a host of different ichthyosaurs. One fossil in particular, specimen ZIN PH 5/250, included cranial remains as well as anterior presacral vertebrae with associated neural arches and ribs. A bone fragment associated with the pectoral girdle is also part of this specimen. Based on this material Zverkov et al. erected the species Aurororborealia incognita, while also describing a series of referred specimens (which however did not factor into the diagnosis of the genus).

The generic name references the Aurora Borealis, the northern lights seen at higher latitudes including the holotype locality. The species epithet "incognita" was chosen to reflect the fragmentary nature of the fossil, rendering it difficult to determine the phylogenetic placement of the taxon.

== Description ==
Although fragmentary, fossils suggest that Auroroborealia was a small bodied animal, the measurements of the vertebrae and mandible suggesting it was potentially similar in size to the basal parvipelvian Hudsonelpidia. This would indicate a total body length between 1 and 1.5 meters for Auroroborealia. Although the authors note that the fragmentary nature of the holotype makes it difficult to determine its ontogenetic state, meaning the age of the individual is unknown, it is reasoned that the presence of similarly-sized individuals from the same stratigraphic level make it more likely that Auroroborealia was simply a small taxon, rather than the assemblage preserving just juvenile specimens.

== Phylogeny ==
The mandible of Auroroborealia is very similar to those of toretocnemid ichthyosaurs, although the genus is notably younger than any member of said family. Although this anatomy differs from parvipelvians, the authors do not rule out the possibility that this anatomy could be basal to the group, as preservation in early members of the clade is poor. They further note that the similar mandibular morphology could be the result of the taxon convergently obtaining a similar feeding ecology. Ultimately Auroroborealia could either represent the youngest member of Toretocnemidae or the oldest member of Parvipelvia, or even a unique branch of euichthyosaur closely related to the two. Zverkov et al. tentatively place the taxon in the latter.

== Paleobiology ==
Although the exact paleolatitude of the New Siberian Islands is only imprecisely known, existing palaeogeographic reconstructions suggest that the area would have been situated at a high latitude during the Late Triassic. Despite the fragmentary nature of many of the remains, researchers were regardless able to differentiate between 3 major size classes and 3 major clades present in both Norian and Carnian strata of the region. The largest remains have been referred to indetermined shastasaurids, with the fossils suggesting a size greater than that of Shastasaurus, but still smaller than Shonisaurus. Medium-sized taxa are represented by indetermined ichthyosaurians and, in Norian strata, possibly euichthyosaurians. The smallest specimens meanwhile have been assigned to Euichthyosauria. This general combination of taxonomic groups mirrors what has been characterised as "transitional ichthyosaur fauna" of the Pardonet Formation in British Columbia, which included massive shastasaurids, medium sized parvipelvians and small euichthyosaurs.
