= La Caja Formation =

Geologic formation in Mexico

- Stratigraphic range: Kimmeridgian–Berriasian
- Type: Formation
- Underlies: Taraises Formation
- Overlies: Zuloaga Formation
- Area: Coahuila
- Thickness: Around 60 metres

Lithology
- Primary: Marl
- Other: Limestone, Siltstone, Sandstone, Shale

Location
- Country: Mexico

The La Caja Formation is a geologic formation in northern Mexico. It preserves fossils dating from the Kimmeridgian to the lower Berriasian. La Caja Formation is widespread in northeastern and central Mexico and known for their abundant and diverse well-preserved ammonites. It was deposited in hemipelagic conditions, and predominantly consists of siliclastic sediments, including marl, with limestone. It is laterally equivalent to the La Casita Formation, which represent more proximal facies. The ichthyosaur Parrassaurus yacahuitztli, metriorhynchid Cricosaurus saltillensis, and the giant pliosaur "Monster of Aramberri" are known from the formation.

== See also ==
- List of fossiliferous stratigraphic units in Mexico
