= Michael Heckert =

German artist

Michael Heckert (born 29 October 1950, in Halle an der Saale) is a contemporary German painter.

Heckert dedicates himself to abstract expressionism. The artist depicts and describes the phenomenon of the female. He was influenced by American painter Willem de Kooning.

== Life ==
Heckert grew up in Ostwestfalen, Germany. He has lived and maintained his studio in a small village near Griefswald in Mecklenburg-Vorpommern since 2018.

In early childhood Heckert displayed an unusual artistic talent for painting, and he determined to become a painter. His parents judged his passion as “breadless art” and forced him to complete an apprenticeship as a wholesale and foreign trade merchandiser in order to support financially his parental household (out of 96,- German Marks net wage during the first year as an apprentice he had to deliver at home 80,- German Marks ). After 11 years of little success in this occupation he managed – in spite of only having studied up to the compulsory school level – to study arts in the SHFBK Braunschweig and graduated with outstanding achievements.

== Artistic career ==
Heckert's first exhibition was in 1982 in Cologne, in the Heinz Holtmann Gallery, and was considered successful. His longing for illimitability in expression led 1984 to a change of style in his paintings: he turned away from the half figurative paintings and sought to materialise his mode of expression in abstract painting. Despite the strong influence of de Kooning, he developed his own form for his artistic contents: The female.

At the beginning of 2007 Heckert moved to Port-au-Prince, where he encountered new impressions and challenges. The local art which predominantly deals with Voodoo and the everyday life of the Haitian people inspires increasingly his oeuvre.
