= Caeruleodentatus =

Caeruleodentatus Temporal range: Burdigalian

Scientific classification
- Kingdom: Animalia
- Phylum: Chordata
- Class: Reptilia
- Order: Squamata
- Suborder: Iguania
- Family: incertae sedis
- Genus: †Caeruleodentatus
- Species: †C. lovei

Binomial name
- †Caeruleodentatus lovei Scarpetta, 2021

Extinct iguanian genus

Caeruleodentatus is an extinct genus of iguanian that lived during the Burdigalian stage of the Miocene epoch.

== Distribution ==
Caeruleodentatus lovei is known from Wyoming that date back to the Middle Miocene Climatic Optimum (MMCO) or immediately before it, around 17.5 Ma.
