= Rageryx =

Rageryx Temporal range: Lutetian

Scientific classification
- Kingdom: Animalia
- Phylum: Chordata
- Class: Reptilia
- Order: Squamata
- Suborder: Serpentes
- Family: Boidae
- Genus: †Rageryx
- Species: †R. schmidi

Binomial name
- †Rageryx schmidi Smith & Scanferla, 2021

Extinct genus of snakes

Rageryx is an extinct genus of erycine boid that lived during the Eocene epoch.

== Distribution ==
Rageryx schmidi is known from the Messel Formation of Germany.
