= Hecker (surname) =

Hecker is a surname. Notable people with the surname include:

- Chris Hecker, American video game programmer
- Ewald Hecker (1843-1909), German psychiatrist, originator of the concept of hebephrenia
- Ewald Otto E. Hecker (1879-1954), German industrialist and Nazi SS-Brigadeführer
- Florian Hecker (born 1975), German electronic musician
- Friedrich Hecker (1811-1881), German Forty-Eighter and veteran of the American Civil War
- Isaac Thomas Hecker (1818-1889), Roman Catholic priest, founder of the Paulist Fathers
- Jakob Hecker (1887-1969), German painter
- Jan Hecker (1967-2021), German lawyer and diplomat
- Johann Julius Hecker (1707-1768), a German educator
- Justus Hecker (1795-1850), German medical historian
- Lawrence Hecker, (1931–2024) sex-abusing priest in the Catholic Archdiocese of New Orleans
- Max Hecker (1879–1964), Austrian-born Israeli President of the Technion – Israel Institute of Technology
- Maximilian Hecker (born 1977), German pop musician
- Robert Hecker (born 1965), guitarist for California punk band Redd Kross
- Scott Hecker, sound editor
- Siegfried Hecker (born 1943), Director of Los Alamos National Laboratory, professor at Stanford University
- Tim Hecker (born 1974), Canadian electronic musician, known as Jetone

== See also ==
- Johnny Hekker (1990-) NFL punter
- Kimm Hekker (1957-) Dutch singer
- George Hekkers (1923-2008) NFL tackle
