= Desert Museum (Mexico) =

Museum in Saltillo, Coahuila, Mexico

Coordinates: 25.414037°N 100.963744°W

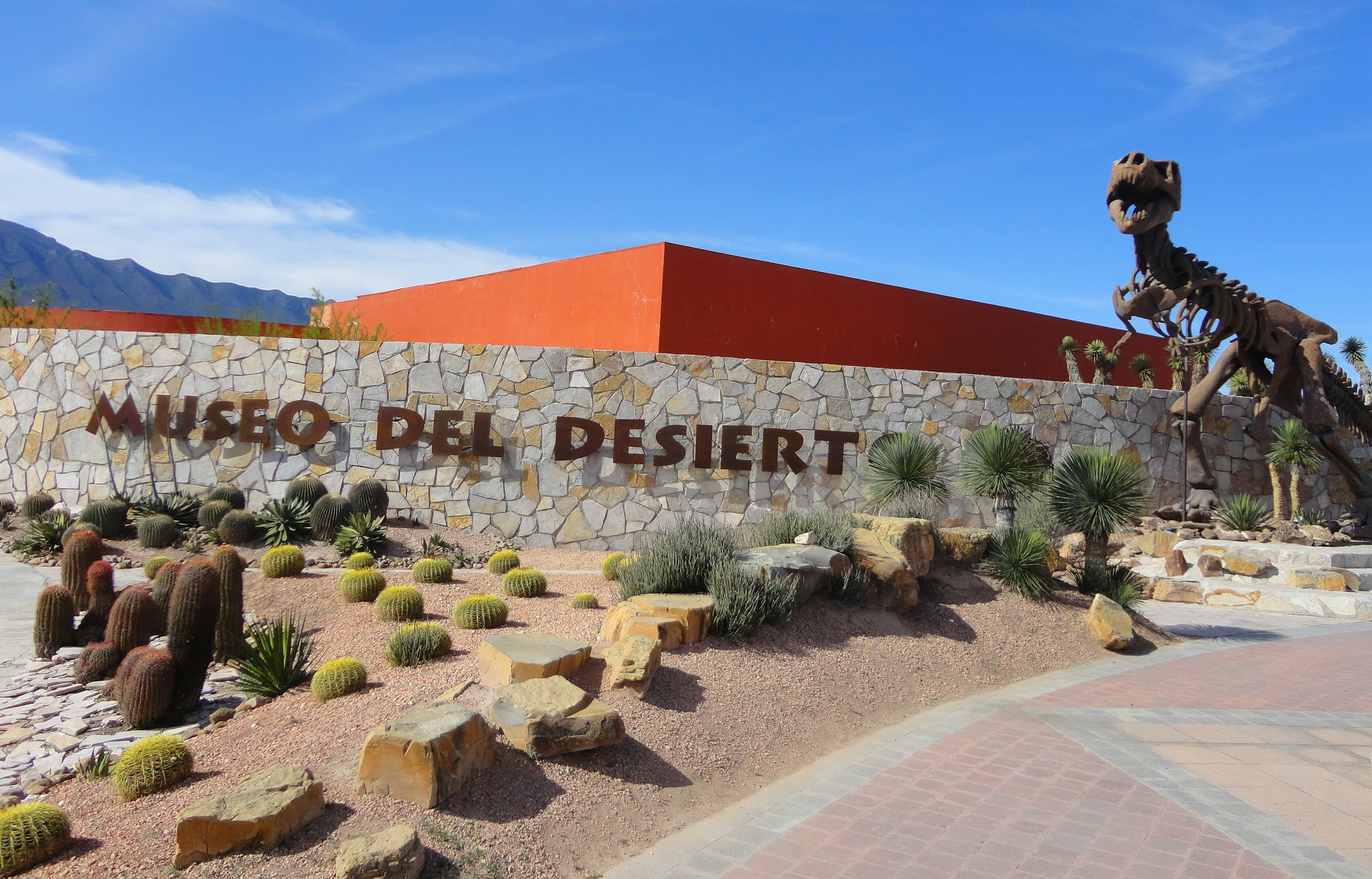
Museo del Desierto

The Desert Museum (Spanish: Museo del Desierto) is a museum in Saltillo, Coahuila, Mexico, that promotes an ecological culture. It was designed by the architect Francisco López Guerra and was inaugurated on 25 November 1999. It has a large collection of fossils and plants and includes autochthonous animals of the Mexican desert.

== History ==
The Museum of the Desert was inaugurated on 25 November 1999 by then-President Ernesto Zedillo and also the directors of the Amigos del Desierto de Coahuila foundation. The project was intended to promote an ecological culture by showing the wealth of life and the evolution of species through time in an interactive way. The project was conceived in the 1990s with the beginning of important discoveries in the area about the geology, anthropology, palaeontology and biology in the region, as part of a collaboration in all these work areas.

== Pavilions ==
The museum is divided into four main pavilions with different themes.

=== The desert and its past ===
Due to factors such as erosion, the different geological structures have made it simpler to discover fossils in the Mexican deserts which have helped to understand more about these forms of life. The collections and exhibitions shown in this pavilion explore the origins of deserts. Also it is possible to appreciate the mineral wealth where coal is the main mineral extracted in this region. The museum also features dinosaurs which lived in the region: Isauria, Sabinosaurio, Quetzalcoatlus and a Tyrannosaurus rex 17 meters long and five meters high, as well as interactive displays about recent discoveries in the palaeontology of the region

=== Man and the desert: A space of meetings ===
This pavilion shows mainly the habits and rituals of the nomads who lived in this region. It is possible to appreciate the petroglyphs and rupestrian paintings, which are very characteristic of this area.

=== Evolution and biodiversity ===
This pavilion in particular was inaugurated on 4 August 2005. It displays the traces of the evolution along the last 12,000 years, as during this period the biodiversity in this region witnessed mammoths, saber-toothed cats, short-faced bears and gomphotheres.

=== The Laboratory of life ===
This interactive pavilion traces 70 million years backwards, showing the greater quantity of fauna through a biodome. Also it has a laboratory of herpetology where specialists work with the museum's reptiles.
