= La Casita Formation =

Geologic formation in Mexico

- Stratigraphic range: Kimmeridgian–Berriasian
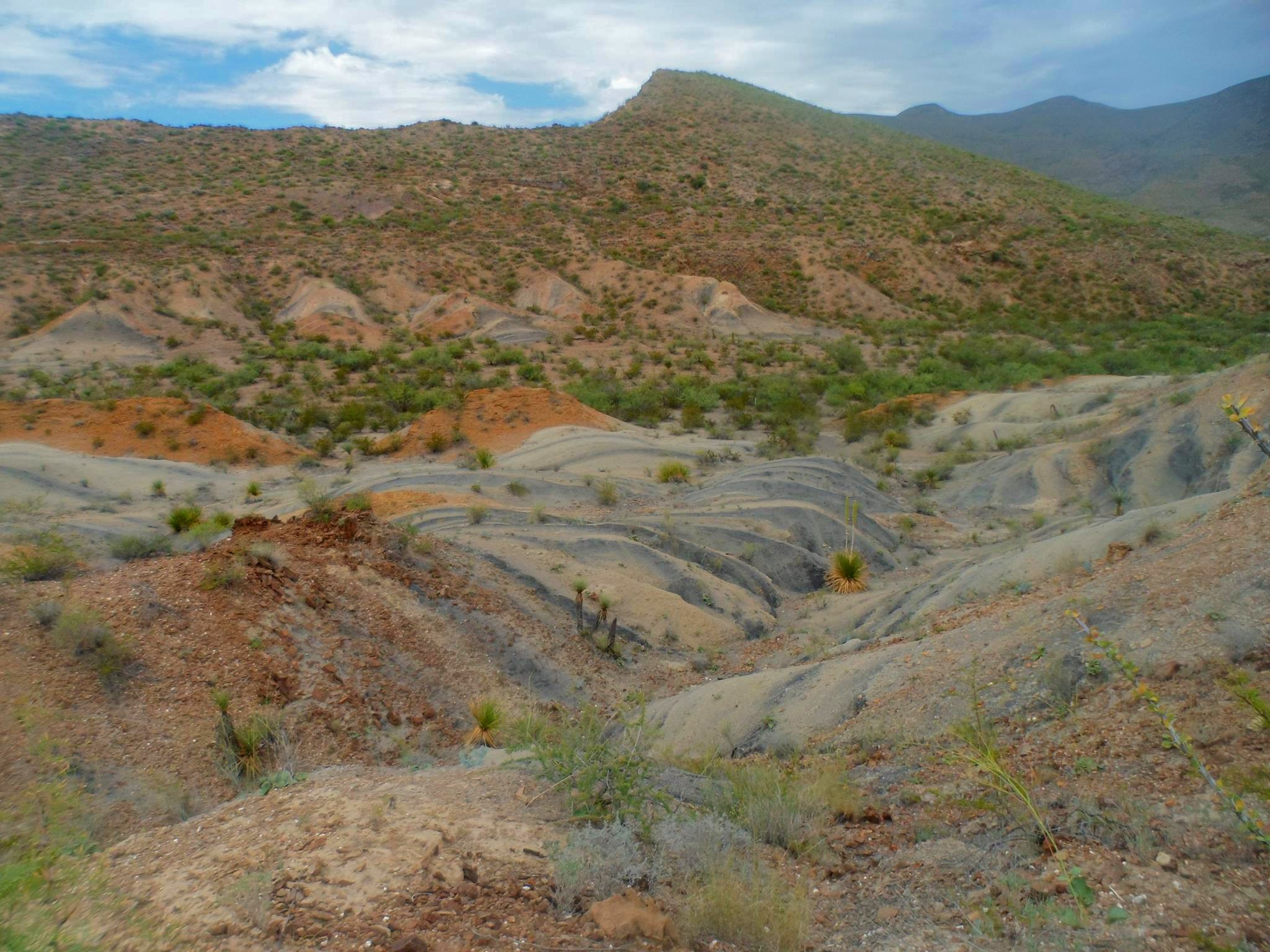
- Sedimentary folds of La Casita Formation near Aldama, Mexico
- Type: Formation
- Underlies: Taraises Formation
- Overlies: Zuloaga Formation
- Area: Chihuahua, Coahuila, Durango, Nuevo León, Tamaulipas
- Thickness: Around 60 metres

Lithology
- Primary: Siltstone
- Other: Shale

Location
- Country: Mexico

Type section
- Named by: Imlay 1969

The La Casita Formation is a geologic formation located in northern Mexico. It preserves fossils dating back to the Kimmeridgian to lowermost Berriasian. It is laterally equivalent to the La Caja Formation and the Pimienta Formation. The ichthyosaurs Jabalisaurus and Acuetzpalin are known from the formation, as well as the metriorhynchid Dakosaurus and indeterminate pliosaurs.

== See also ==
- List of fossiliferous stratigraphic units in Mexico
