= Triopticus =

Triopticus Temporal range: Carnian - Norian, 229–226 Ma

Scientific classification
- Kingdom: Animalia
- Phylum: Chordata
- Class: Reptilia
- Clade: Archosauriformes
- Clade: †Protopyknosia
- Genus: †Triopticus; Stocker et al., 2016
- Species: †T. primus

Binomial name
- †Triopticus primus Stocker et al., 2016

Extinct genus of reptiles

Triopticus is a genus of archosauriform reptile from the Late Triassic of Texas, United States. It contains a single species, Triopticus primus, described in 2016 by Stocker et al. It has an unusually domed head reminiscent of the later pachycephalosaurian dinosaurs in an example of convergent evolution.

== Description ==
The portion of the head that is preserved shows remarkable similarities to the specialized heads of pachycephalosaurs. Five bosses, or rounded protuberances of bone are visible on the fossil, with one on the frontal bone and two pairs behind (respectively on the postorbital bone and the squamosal/parietal bones) separated by a shallow groove. The backmost pair of bosses form a thick shelf that stretches outwards and backwards over the rear end of the skull, comparable to the domes of pachycephalosaurs and the frills of ceratopsians. The bosses have very roughly textured surfaces, suggesting that they would have been covered by keratin in life.

CT scans show that the bosses internally have three distinct layers of bone, with a dense innermost layer which resembles the typical skull roof in texture, followed by a spongy, porous layer filled with blood vessels, and the least dense third layer close to the surface. Pachycephalosaurs like Stegoceras also similarly have three layers of bone inside its dome, but the second layer is the least dense as opposed to the third. However, this difference may arise from differential deposition of minerals in the skull.

The deep pit in the back of the skull of Triopticus likely arises from the two back pairs of bosses growing around this region, not unlike the holes of doughnuts. It is also possible that the pit is an opening for the pineal gland, as it is in approximately the right position, but this is less likely because no other archosauriforms have such an opening, and the opening does not appear to be connected to any internal structures. The pit has the same texture as the bosses, suggesting that it was also potentially covered in keratin.

The eye socket is very large, and it is surrounded by mineralized cartilage, a trait only seen otherwise in pachycephalosaurs. CT scans also revealed large optic nerves as well as long semicircular canals and a relatively large cerebellar flocculus (both involved in stabilizing gaze, although long semicircular canals are also associated with bipedal stances). These traits suggest that Triopticus was a very visually-oriented animal. Otherwise, the structure of the brain is generally similar to other archosauriforms, although it superficially resembles that of Stegoceras.

Despite the heavy similarity of Triopticus to pachycephalosaurs, there are a number of traits that indicate its archosauriform identity. In Triopticus, the parabasisphenoid bone is horizontal, the posttemporal fenestrae at the back of the braincase are not sealed off at all, and the region where the squamosal bone and quadrate bone come into contact is not externally visible, all of which indicate that it is not a basal dinosaur. Additionally, a narrow strip of smooth bone on the lacrimal bone in front of the eye sockets forms the margin of the antorbital fenestra and the associated antorbital fossa, which are distinctly archosauriform characteristics.

== Discovery and naming ==
The only known specimen of Triopticus, TMM 31100-1030, consists of a braincase containing part of the eye socket. It was discovered in Quarry 3 of the Otis Chalk in Howard County, Texas, which is part of the Dockum Group. While the Otis Chalk itself has not yet been dated, comparisons with the animal fauna of other sites (including the Pekin Formation of North Carolina) suggest a potential age between 229 Ma and 226 Ma.

The genus name of Triopticus is derived from the Latin tri ("three") and optic ("vision"), in reference to a large pit in the back of the skull reminiscent of a third eye socket. The species name, primus, is the Latin word for "first".

== Classification ==
A phylogenetic analysis was conducted in 2016 in an attempt to elucidate the relationships of Triopticus. The phylogenetic tree recovered by the analysis, reproduced below, found Triopticus in a polytomy with other basal archosauriforms.

- Archosauromorpha
  - Protorosaurus speneri
  - - Tanystropheidae
    - - Rhynchosauria
      - - - Pamelaria dolichotrachela
          - - Azendohsauridae
            - Trilophosauridae
        - - Prolacerta broomi
          - Archosauriformes
            - "Chasmatosaurus" yuani
            - Proterosuchus
            - Triopticus primus
            - Erythrosuchus africanus
            - Euparkeria capensis
            - Chanaresuchus bonapartei
            - Archosauria
              - Batrachotomus kupferzellensis
              - Dinosauria

== Paleoecology ==
In the Otis Chalk assemblage, Triopticus lived alongside a number of other archosauriforms including the allokotosaurs Trilophosaurus and Malerisaurus; the doswelliid Doswellia; the phytosaurs Parasuchus and Angistorhinus; the aetosaurs Longosuchus, Lucasuchus, and Coahomasuchus; the shuvosaurid Effigia; the silesaurid Silesaurus; the lagerpetid dinosauromorph Dromomeron, and the coelophysoid theropod dinosaur Lepidus. Some of these also exhibit evolutionary convergence upon archosaurs living after the Triassic–Jurassic extinction event - the phytosaurs resemble the thalattosuchians, gavialoids, and spinosaurids, the aetosaurs resemble the ankylosaurs, and the shuvosaurids resemble the ornithomimosaurs.
