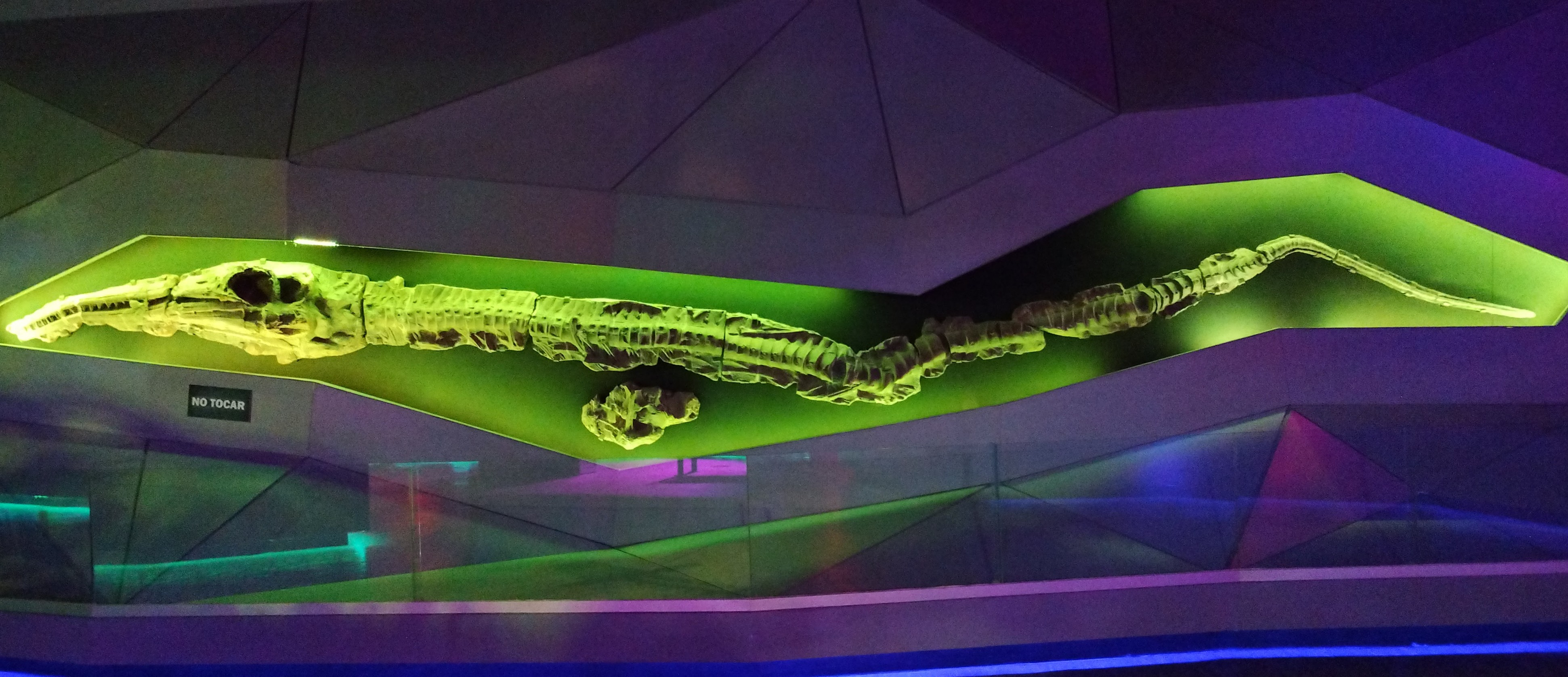
- Fossil in Museo de la Evolución, Puebla.

Scientific classification
- Domain: Eukaryota
- Kingdom: Animalia
- Phylum: Chordata
- Class: Reptilia
- Order: †Ichthyosauria
- Family: †Ophthalmosauridae
- Subfamily: †Platypterygiinae
- Genus: †Parrassaurus; Barrientos-Lara and Alvarado-Ortega, 2021

Type species
- †Parrassaurus yacahuitztli Barrientos-Lara and Alvarado-Ortega, 2021

= Parrassaurus =

Parrassaurus Temporal range: Tithonian

Extinct genus of marine reptile

Parrassaurus is an ophthalmosaurid ichthyosaur from the late Jurassic La Caja Formation of Mexico named in 2021. Parrassaurus includes one species, Parrassaurus yacahuitztli. The type specimen (CPC 307) was around 5 metres (16 ft) long.
