= Vjushkovisaurus =

Vjushkovisaurus Temporal range: Middle Triassic, Anisian

Scientific classification
- Domain: Eukaryota
- Kingdom: Animalia
- Phylum: Chordata
- Class: Reptilia
- Clade: Archosauromorpha
- Clade: Archosauriformes
- Genus: †Vjushkovisaurus; Ochev, 1982

Type species
- †Vjushkovisaurus berdjanensis Ochev, 1982

Extinct genus of reptiles

Vjushkovisaurus is an extinct genus of Middle Triassic archosauriform. It is known from the Anisian-aged Donguz Gorizont in Sol-Iletsk, Orenburg Oblast, Russia. The genus was named in 1982, with the type species being V. berdjanensis. Material has been collected in the Berdyanka II locality from a fossil assemblage called the Eryosuchus Fauna along the Berdyanka River, specifically in a sand-carbonate concretion in the upper part of the main river channel. Vjushkovisaurus is known only from the holotype PIN 2865/62 (formerly SGU 104/3871), a partial postcranial skeleton which consists of 12 presacral vertebrae, left humerus, ribs, a fragment of the coracoid and a fragment of the fibula.

== Description ==
Most rauisuchids have a crest on the ilium called the supra-acetabular process that overlies the head of the femur, allowing them to have a "pillar-erect" stance. As an early rauisuchid Vjushkovisaurus lacks this crest, but it does have a small thickening on the surface of the ilium. The humerus differs from other better known rauisuchids in that it is shorter and broader. However, it has been suggested that the only known humerus of Vjushkovisaurus may actually belong to an aetosaur.

More recently, Nesbitt (2009) argued that Vjushkovisaurus represent most probably a valid non-archosaurian archosauriform. According to his analysis, the original diagnosis of Vjushkovisaurus by Ochev (1982) consisted of some of the plesiomorphies for Archosauriformes and characters with wide distributions throughout archosauriforms. For example, elongated anterior cervical vertebrae are present in the poposauroids, Yarasuchus, and in the non-archosaurian archosauriforms Proterosuchus and Guchengosuchus. Other features which are typically thought to be associated with skeletal pneumaticity, are also present in Guchengosuchus, Erythrosuchus, and in several archosaurs. Additionally, the shape and placement of the deltopectoral crests of the humerus of Vjushkovisaurus are typical of basal archosauriforms. The ectepicondylar groove on the humerus reported by Ochev is present in Prolacerta, Proterosuchus, phytosaurs, aetosaurs and several paracrocodylomorphs. Gower and Sennikov (2000) reported that the posterior cervical vertebrae bear well-defined facets for three-headed ribs. According to Nesbitt (2009), this trait is absent in Archosauria with the possible exception of Arizonasaurus and Poposaurus, but was used as a synapomorphy of Erythrosuchia in Parrish (1992) phylogenetic analysis.

== Paleobiology ==
Other vertebrates from the Berdyanka II locality that lived alongside Vjushkovisaurus include capitosauroid temnospondyls and the therapsid Nothogomphodon, one of the last therocephalians. Vjushkovisaurus was likely a top predator in its environment along other large carnivores including Dongusuchus and Erythrosuchus.
