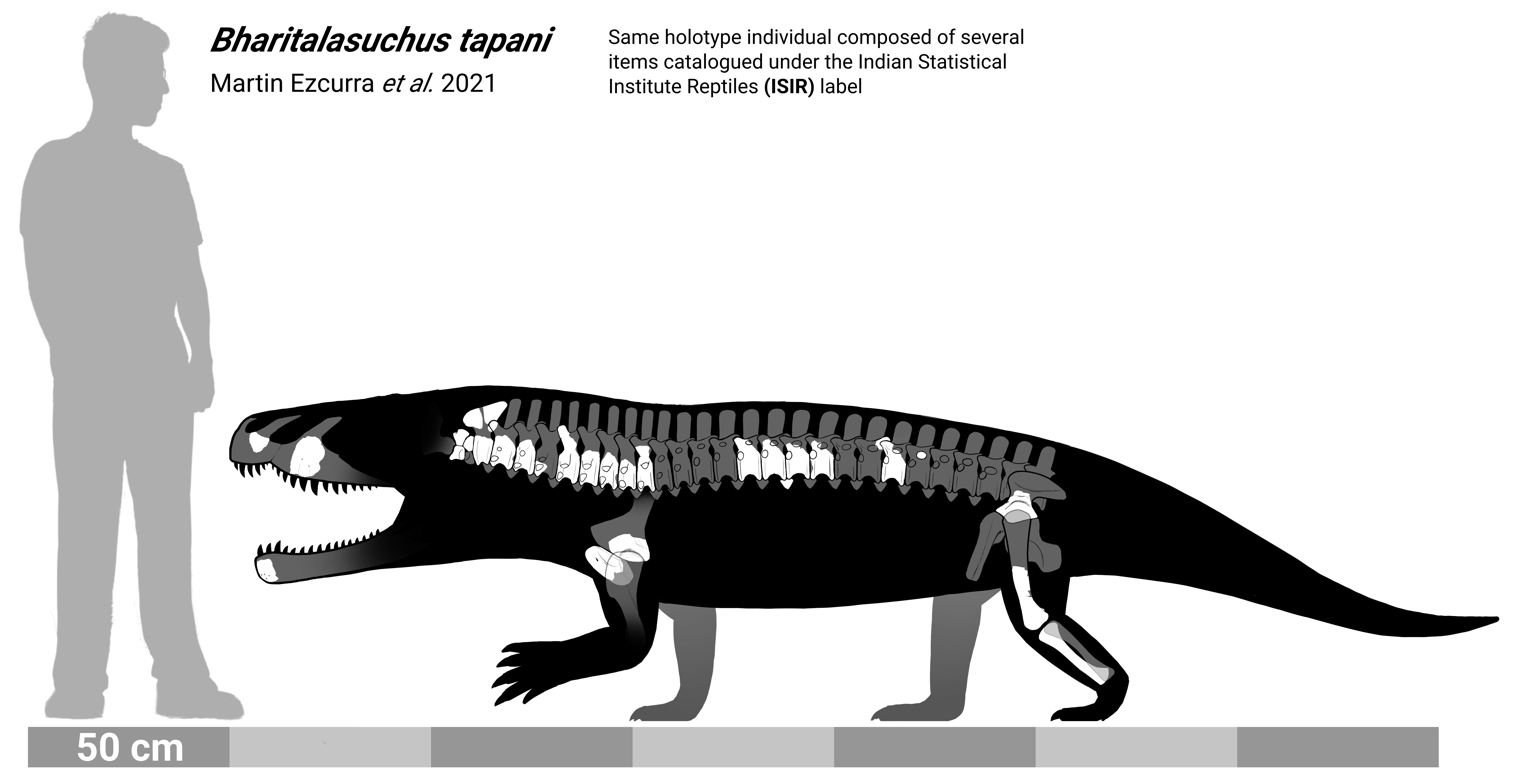
- Skeletal reconstruction and size comparison of the holotype

Scientific classification
- Kingdom: Animalia
- Phylum: Chordata
- Class: Reptilia
- Family: †Erythrosuchidae
- Genus: †Bharitalasuchus; Martin Ezcurra et al. 2021
- Species: †B. tapani

Binomial name
- †Bharitalasuchus tapani Martin Ezcurra et al. 2021

= Bharitalasuchus =

Bharitalasuchus Temporal range: Anisian to Ladinian, ~245.5–240.3 Ma

Extinct genus of reptiles

Bharitalasuchus is an extinct genus of erythrosuchid archosauriform known from the Middle Triassic Yerrapalli Formation of India. It contains a single species, Bharitalasuchus tapani, known from a holotype and paratype consisting of tooth-bearing cranial fragments (maxillae and possible premaxillae), at least 17 presacral vertebrae, ribs, probable intercentra, fragmentary pectoral and pelvic girdles, a femur, and tibiofibular elements. The discovery and description of this taxon was important for the understanding of not only the age of the Yerrapalli Formation, but also the global distribution of the erythrosuchids at the time of their demise.

== Discovery and classification ==
The first remains of Bharitalasuchus were recovered from the Yerrapalli Formation in the 1960s and housed in the Indian Statistical Institute of Calcutta, but were never formally described until 2021, being named Bharitalasuchus tapani after the Telugu words "Bhari," meaning heavy, and "Tala," meaning head; along with the species name tapani as a tribute to Indian paleontologist Tapan Roy Chowdhury. It consists of a holotype and referred paratype with distinguishing autapomorphies being the unique combination of character states of features of its vertebrae and other postcranial elements combined. The phylogenetic analysis conducted by Ezcura et al. after its discovery found the species to be closest to Shansisuchus shansisuchus and Chalishevia cothurnata from China and Russia respectively. Its discovery has important implications on the geographical and temporal range of the erythrosuchids by the time of their extinction.
