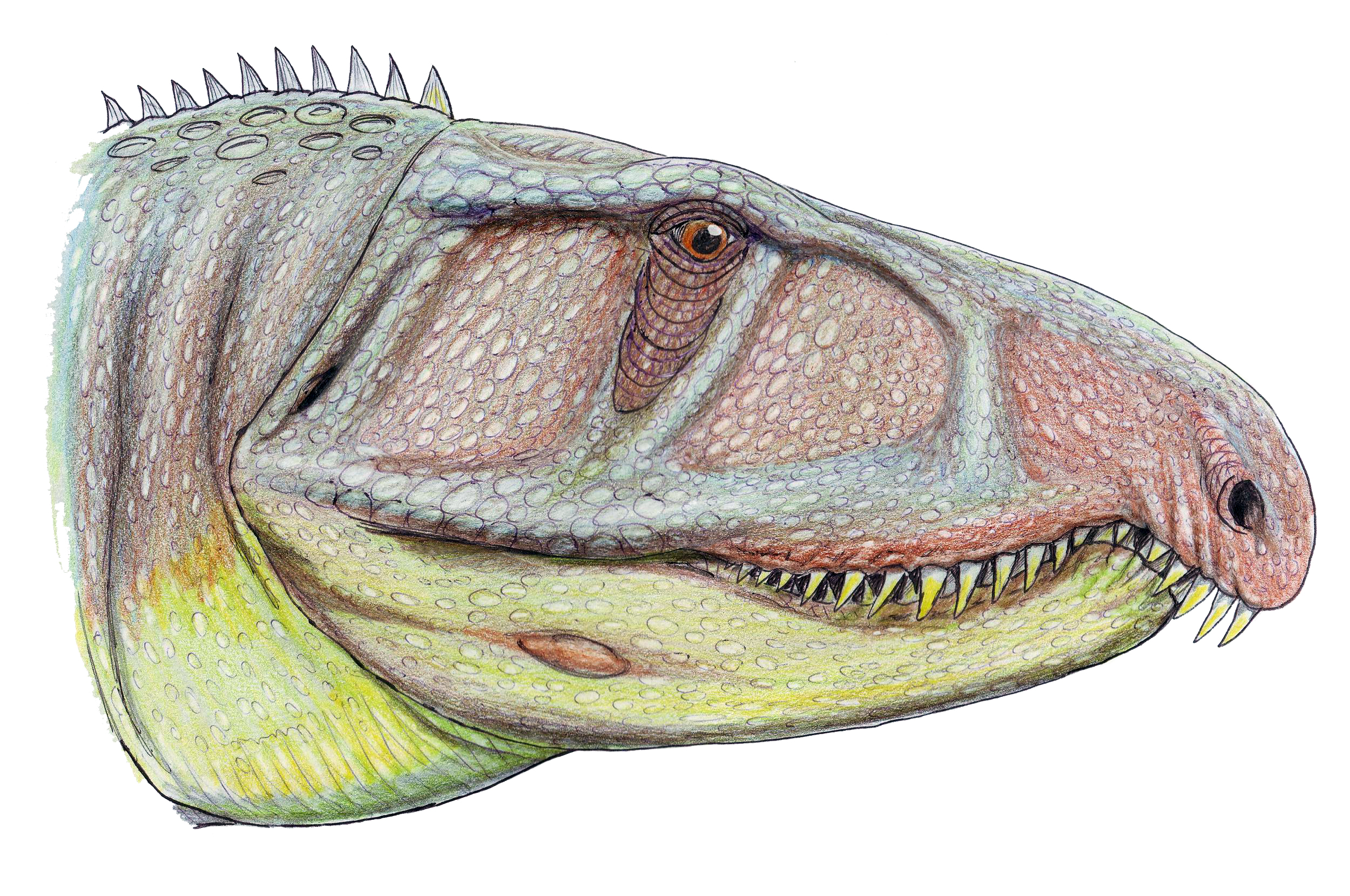
- Life restoration of Uralosaurus

Scientific classification
- Domain: Eukaryota
- Kingdom: Animalia
- Phylum: Chordata
- Class: Reptilia
- Clade: Archosauromorpha
- Clade: Archosauriformes
- Family: †Erythrosuchidae
- Genus: †Uralosaurus; Sennikov, 1995

Type species
- †Erythrosuchus magnus Ochev, 1980

Species
- †U. magnus (Ochev, 1980)

Synonyms
- Erythrosuchus magnus Ochev, 1980

= Uralosaurus =

Uralosaurus Temporal range: Middle Triassic, Anisian

Extinct genus of reptiles

Uralosaurus is an extinct genus of erythrosuchid archosauriform known from the Middle Triassic (Anisian stage) Donguz Formation of southeastern European Russia. It contains a single species, Uralosaurus magnus. It was named by Vitalii Georgievich Ochev in 1980 as a species of Erythrosuchus otherwise known from the Triassic of Africa and reassigned to its own genus by Andrey G. Sennikov in 1995.

== Discovery ==
Uralosaurus is known from the holotype PIN 2973/70, left pterygoid, and from the paratypes PIN 2973/71, lower jaw, and also PIN 2973/72 through PIN 2973/79, teeth. These specimens were collected at the Karagachka locality (locality 34 or PIN 2973), to the opposite bank of the Karagatschka River from Karagachka village located in a drainage basin of left bank of the Ural River, Sol’Iletsk district of Orenburg Region, southern European Russia. They came from the lower Donguz Gorizont of Donguz Formation, which dates to the Anisian stage. Ochev (1979) referred these specimens to a new species of Erythrosuchus which he named Erythrosuchus magnus, in reference to the relatively larger size of this species. Sennikov (1995) reassigned this species to its own genus, creating the new combination Uralosaurus magnus. The generic name refers to the Ural River, the area where specimens of Uralosaurus were found.

Other specimens that were referred to Uralosaurus were summarized by Gower & Sennikov (2000). Four presacral vertebrae PIN 952/95 were collected from Donguz Gorizont, at Donguz I (locality 36), from the right bank of the Donguz River, 1 km downstream of Perovsky settlement, also located in a drainage basin of left bank of the Ural River. Dorsal vertebrae PIN 2866/38 through PIN 2866/40 (formerly SGU 104/3857, SGU 104/3858) among other specimens were collected from Donguz Gorizont, at Koltaevo II from Orenburg Region or possibly at Koltayevo III (locality 10) from the Sakmara drainage basin of Bashkortostan as was suggested by Tverdokhlebov et al. (2003).
