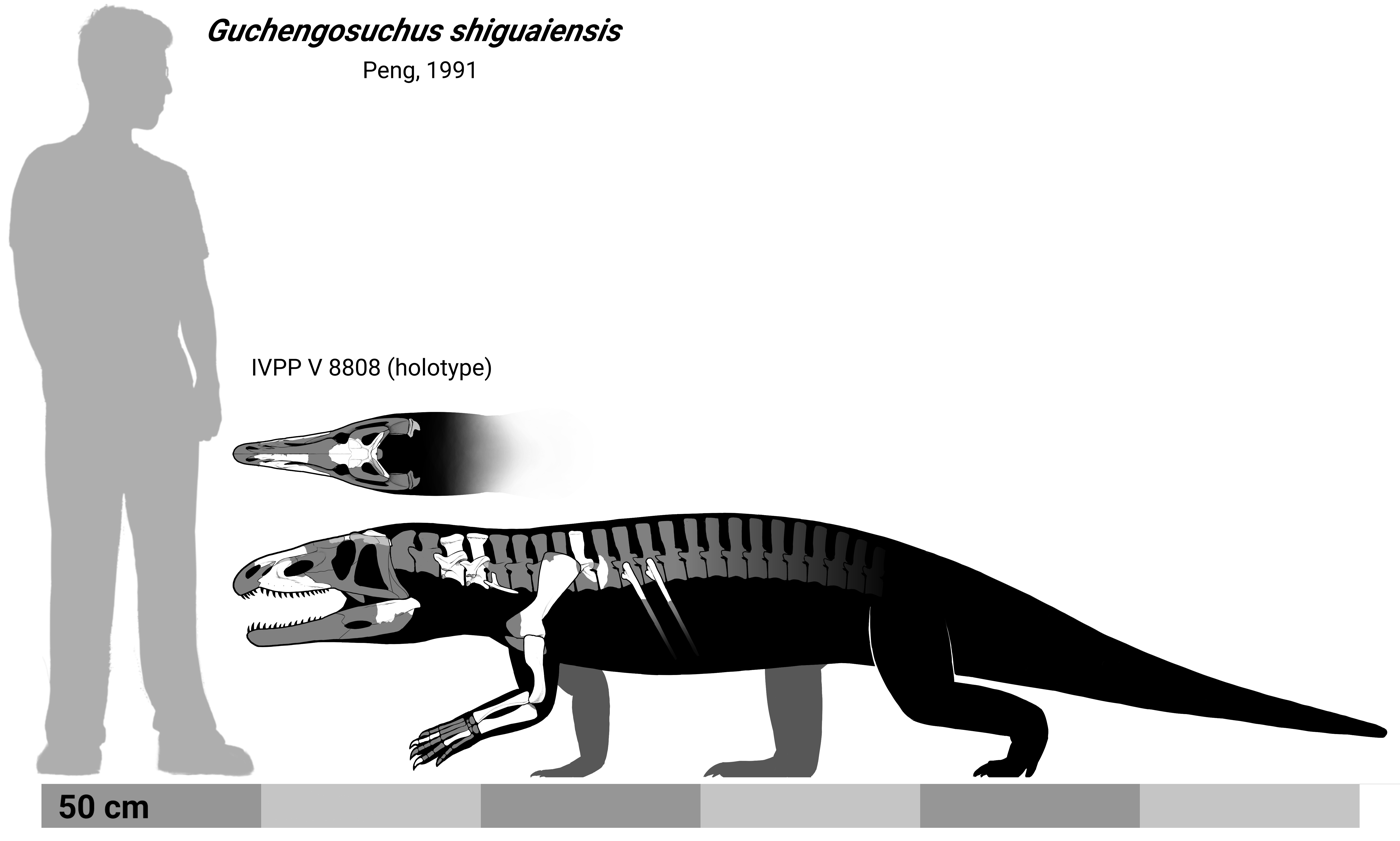
- Skeletal diagram

Scientific classification
- Kingdom: Animalia
- Phylum: Chordata
- Class: Reptilia
- Family: †Erythrosuchidae
- Genus: †Guchengosuchus; Peng, 1991

Type species
- †Guchengosuchus shiguaiensis Peng, 1991

= Guchengosuchus =

Guchengosuchus Temporal range: Early Triassic, Olenekian

Extinct genus of reptiles

Guchengosuchus is an extinct genus of erythrosuchid archosauriform from the Early Triassic of China. It is known from a single holotype skeleton called IVPP V 8808, described in 1991 from the lower Ermaying Formation in Shanxi. The lower Ermaying Formation dates back to the Olenekian stage of the Early Triassic, making Guchengosuchus one of the earliest archosauriforms. IVPP V 8808 is a disarticulated skeleton including a partial skull, lower jaw, some vertebrae, a scapula, and forelimb bones. Like some other erythrosuchids, Guchengosuchus has a tall skull with a notch between the premaxilla and maxilla bones of the upper jaw. The ribs of Guchengosuchus each have three heads, a feature also seen in the Russian erythrosuchid Vjushkovia. When it was first described, Guchengosuchus was placed in the suborder Proterosuchia, a group that included the families Erythrosuchidae, Proterosuchidae, and Proterochampsidae and was thought to be closely related to a primitive group of reptiles called Eosuchia. Proterosuchia is now considered a paraphyletic assemblage of basal archosauriforms representing a series of successive branches of stem group archosaurs.
