= Yerrapalli Formation =

Geologic formation in India

- Stratigraphic range: Anisian; ~247–242 Ma
- Type: Geological formation
- Underlies: Bhimaram Formation
- Overlies: Kamthi Formation
- Thickness: 600 m (2,000 ft)

Lithology
- Primary: Mudstone, sandstone, caliche

Location
- Coordinates: 18.9°N 79.7°E
- Approximate paleocoordinates: 51.4°S 48.5°E
- Region: Andhra Pradesh, Telangana
- Country: India
- Extent: Pranhita–Godavari Basin

Type section
- Named for: Yerrapalli village
- Named by: Jain et al.
- Year defined: 1964
- Yerrapalli Formation (India) Yerrapalli Formation (Telangana)

The Yerrapalli Formation is a Triassic geological formation consisting primarily of mudstones that outcrops in the Pranhita–Godavari Basin in southeastern India. The Yerrapalli Formation preserves fossils of freshwater and terrestrial vertebrates as well as trace fossils of invertebrates. The tetrapod fauna includes temnospondyl amphibians, archosauromorph reptiles, and dicynodonts.

== Geology ==
Most of the Yerrapalli Formation consists of red mudstones. The mudstones were deposited across a floodplain during the Anisian stage of the Middle Triassic. Smaller lenses of calcareous sandstone represent ephemeral streams that branched off from the larger channels that were the source of the floodplain sediments. The climate of the region during the time is thought to have been monsoonal with both wet and dry seasons.

The Yerrapalli Formation overlies the Kamthi Formation, underlies the Bhimaram Formation, and is conformable with both formations. Two members of the Yerrapalli Formation have been recognized; a lower member consisting of layers of red and purple clay with lenses of pale green clay and an upper member consisting of alternating layers of clay and fine-grained sandstone.

== Paleobiota ==
The paleobiota of the Yerrapalli Formation is similar to that of the overlying Maleri Formation, which also preserves fossils of temnospondyls and archosauromorphs. The main difference between the Yerrapalli and the Maleri faunae is the presence of dicynodonts in the former. The discovery of dicynodont fossils in the Pranhita-Godavari Basin in 1964 was one of the earliest indications that the Yerrapalli Formation represented a distinct paleofauna. Before this discovery, Yerrapalli strata were grouped within the Maleri Formation. The dicynodonts of the Yerrapalli Formation are similar to those of the Ntawere Formation in Zambia, which also dates back to the Anisian. During the Middle Triassic, what is now India and southern Africa formed one continuous landmass as part of the supercontinent Gondwana.

=== Synapsids ===
Taxon	Material	Notes	Images
Rechnisaurus cristarhynchus	A mostly complete skull	A kannemeyeriiform dicynodont	
Trirachodontidae indet.	Isolated teeth		
Wadiasaurus indicus		A kannemeyeriiform dicynodont	

=== Reptiles ===
Taxon	Material	Notes	Images
Bharitalasuchus tapani		An erythrosuchid archosauriform	
Mesodapedon kuttyi	Two specimens including skull bones	A rhynchosaur similar to Stenaulorhynchus stockleyi from the Manda Formation of Tanzania, which is the same age as the Yerrapalli Formation	
Pamelaria dolichotrachela	One complete skeleton, one partial skeleton, and isolated bones	A long-necked allokotosaurian archosauromorph	
Yarasuchus deccanensis	An articulated, nearly complete skeleton and a partial disarticulated skeleton	A long-necked aphanosaurian avemetatarsalian	

=== Amphibians ===
Taxon	Material	Notes	Images
"Parotosuchus" rajareddyi		A capitosaurid temnospondyl first referred to Parotosuchus but more recently considered either a species of Eryosuchus or of Stanocephalosaurus	

=== Fish ===
Taxon	Material	Notes	Images
Ceratodus sp.		A lungfish	
Saurichthyidae sp.		A chondrostean ray-finned fish	

Color key: Taxon / Reclassified taxon / Taxon falsely reported as present / Dubious taxon or junior synonym / Ichnotaxon / Ootaxon / Morphotaxon	Notes; Uncertain or tentative taxa are in small text; ~~crossed out~~ taxa are discredited.

== See also ==
- Donguz Formation, contemporaneous fossiliferous formation of Russia
- Ermaying Formation, contemporaneous fossiliferous formation of China
- Manda Formation, contemporaneous fossiliferous formation of Tanzania
- Ntawere Formation, contemporaneous fossiliferous formation of Zambia
- Omingonde Formation, contemporaneous fossiliferous formation of Namibia
