= Triradiate pelvic girdle =

Shared anatomical feature common to archosaurs

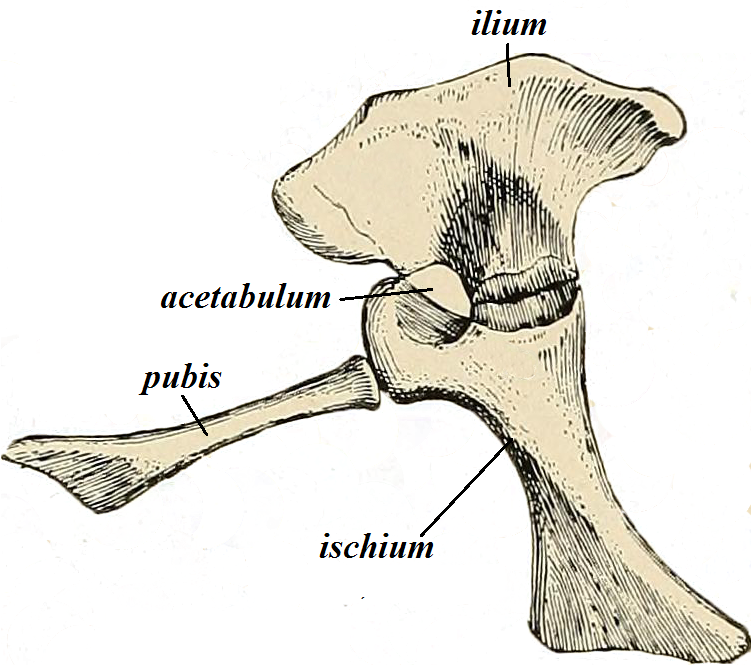
Crocodilian pelvis, showing three-pronged structure

Avian skeleton with pelvic bones highlighted: 1. ilium; 2. pubis; 3. ischium.

The triradiate pelvic girdle is a shared feature common to archosaurs. The pelvis has three prongs, with an elongate pubis and ischium. This feature first appeared in the Erythrosuchidae, large basal archosaurian predators of the early Triassic period.
