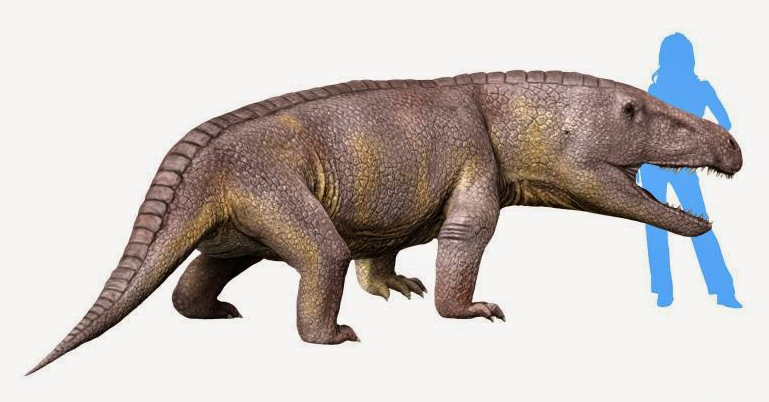
- Erythrosuchus

Scientific classification
- Kingdom: Animalia
- Phylum: Chordata
- Class: Reptilia
- Order: †Thecodontia
- Suborder: †Proterosuchia; Broom 1906

= Proterosuchia =

Obsolete suborder of reptiles

Proterosuchia is one of the suborders of the paraphyletic group Thecodontia, containing the most primitive and ancestral forms. These were primitive, vaguely crocodile-like, archosauriforms that mostly lived during the Early Triassic epoch.

The name Proterosuchia was coined by Robert Broom in 1906. In later classifications, several families were included, such as Proterosuchidae, Erythrosuchidae, and Proterochampsidae.

Under the cladistic system, this is a paraphyletic grade, rather than a natural group. The name is therefore no longer used, although it can be found in many textbooks (up to and including Carroll's Vertebrate Paleontology and Evolution)

In current phylogenetic understanding, the Proterosuchia constitute the basal Archosauriformes; that is, the archosauriform groups but excluding the true Archosauria.
