= Fourth trochanter =

Ridge on the femur of archosaurs

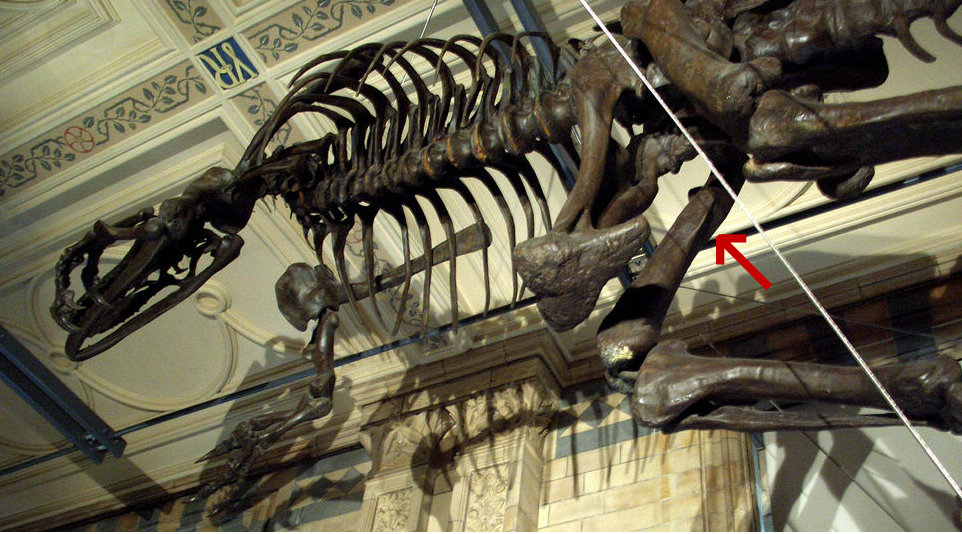
The fourth trochanter (indicated by a red arrow) is visible on this mounted skeleton of Allosaurus fragilis.

The fourth trochanter is a shared characteristic common to archosaurs. It is a protrusion on the posterior-medial side of the middle of the femur shaft that serves as a muscle attachment, mainly for the musculus caudofemoralis longus, the main retractor tail muscle that pulls the thighbone to the rear.

The fourth trochanter is considered homologous with the internal trochanter, an asymmetrical ridge-like structure that extends down from the femoral head and is edged by an intertrochanteric fossa in other reptiles such as lizards. The fourth trochanter can be characterized by its position further down the shaft, symmetrical nature, and lack of an intertrochanteric fossa. The caudofemoralis attachment crest first separated from the femoral head in the Erythrosuchidae, large basal archosauriform predators of the early Triassic period. Shortly afterwards, eucrocopodan archosauriforms (such as Euparkeria) evolved, losing the intertrochanteric fossa and acquiring a symmetrical fourth trochanter.
