= Caudofemoralis =

Tail muscle in many tailed animals

The caudofemoralis (from the Latin cauda, tail and femur, thighbone) is a muscle found in the pelvic limb of mostly all animals possessing a tail. It is thus found in nearly all tetrapods.

== Location ==
The caudofemoralis spans plesiomorphically between femur (thigh) and tail; in mammals it is reduced and found directly posterior/caudal to the gluteus maximus and directly anterior/cranial to the biceps femoris.

== Origin and insertion ==
The caudofemoralis originates from the transverse processes of the second, third and fourth caudal vertebrae. The caudodistal portion of the muscle in mammals lies deep to the proximocranial portion of the biceps femoris; near the middle of the thigh, the caudofemoralis gives rise to a long, thin, and narrow tendon that passes distally to the knee joint and inserts into the fascia lata that is anchored to the lateral border of the patella.

Among archosaurians, the caudofemoralis is divided in a pars pelvica/brevis (characterized by a pelvic origin) and a pars caudalis/longa (caudal origin), and the insertion on the femur is marked by the fourth trochanter (but this becomes reduced in maniraptorans and absent in birds).

== Action ==
In mammals the caudofemoralis acts to flex the tail laterally to its corresponding side when the pelvic limb is bearing weight. When the pelvic limb is lifted off the ground, contraction of the caudofemoralis causes the limb to abduct and the shank to extend by extending the hip joint (acetabulofemoral or coxofemoral joint). In other tetrapods contraction of the caudofemoralis retracts the hindlimb.
