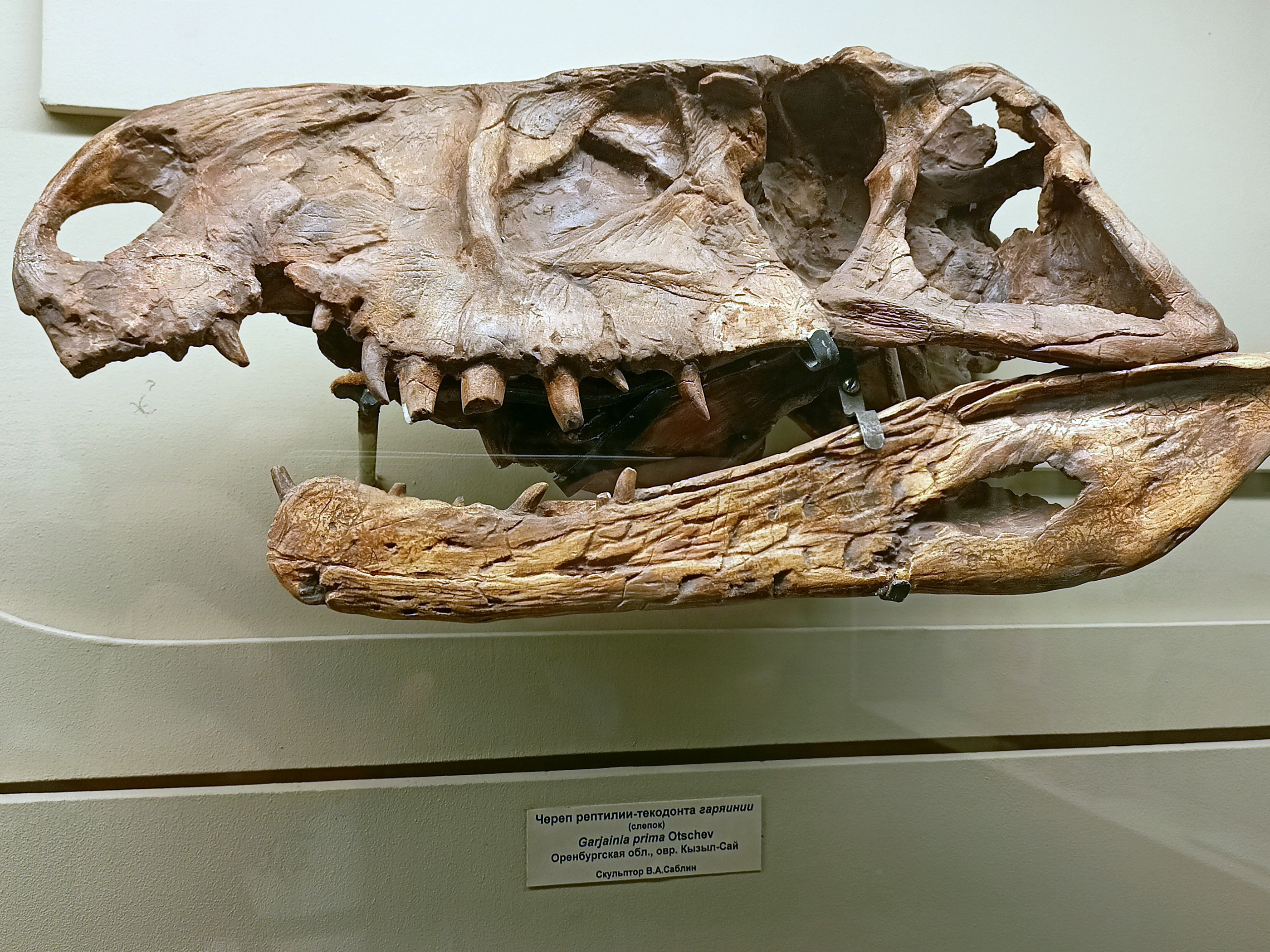
- G. prima skull
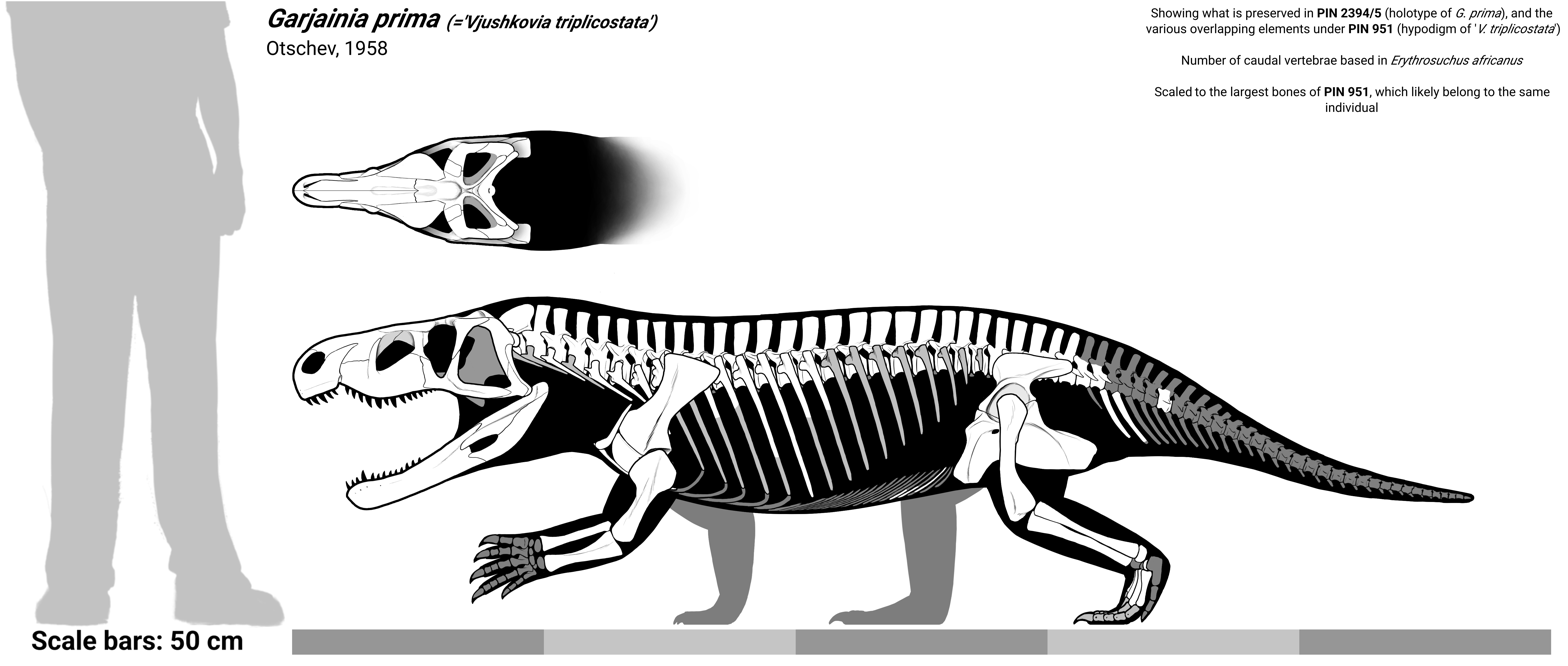
- Skeletal reconstruction of G. prima

Scientific classification
- Kingdom: Animalia
- Phylum: Chordata
- Class: Reptilia
- Family: †Erythrosuchidae
- Genus: †Garjainia; Otschev, 1958

Species
- †Garjainia prima Otschev, 1958 (type); †Garjainia madiba Gower et al., 2014

Synonyms
- Genus synonymy: Vjushkovia Huene, 1960; Species synonymy of G. prima: Garjainia triplicostata (Huene, 1960); Vjushkovia triplicostata Huene, 1960

= Garjainia =

Garjainia Temporal range: Early Triassic, Olenekian

Extinct genus of reptiles

Garjainia is an extinct genus of erythrosuchid archosauriform reptile from the Olenekian of Russia and South Africa. It contains two species, Garjainia prima, from the Yarengian/Yarkenskian Supergorizont of Russia, and Garjainia madiba, from the Burgersdorp Formation (Cynognathus Assemblage Zone A) of South Africa. "Vjuskovia triplicostata", a name assigned to some erythrosuchid fossils from Russia, has been synonymized with Garjainia prima.

== Discovery ==
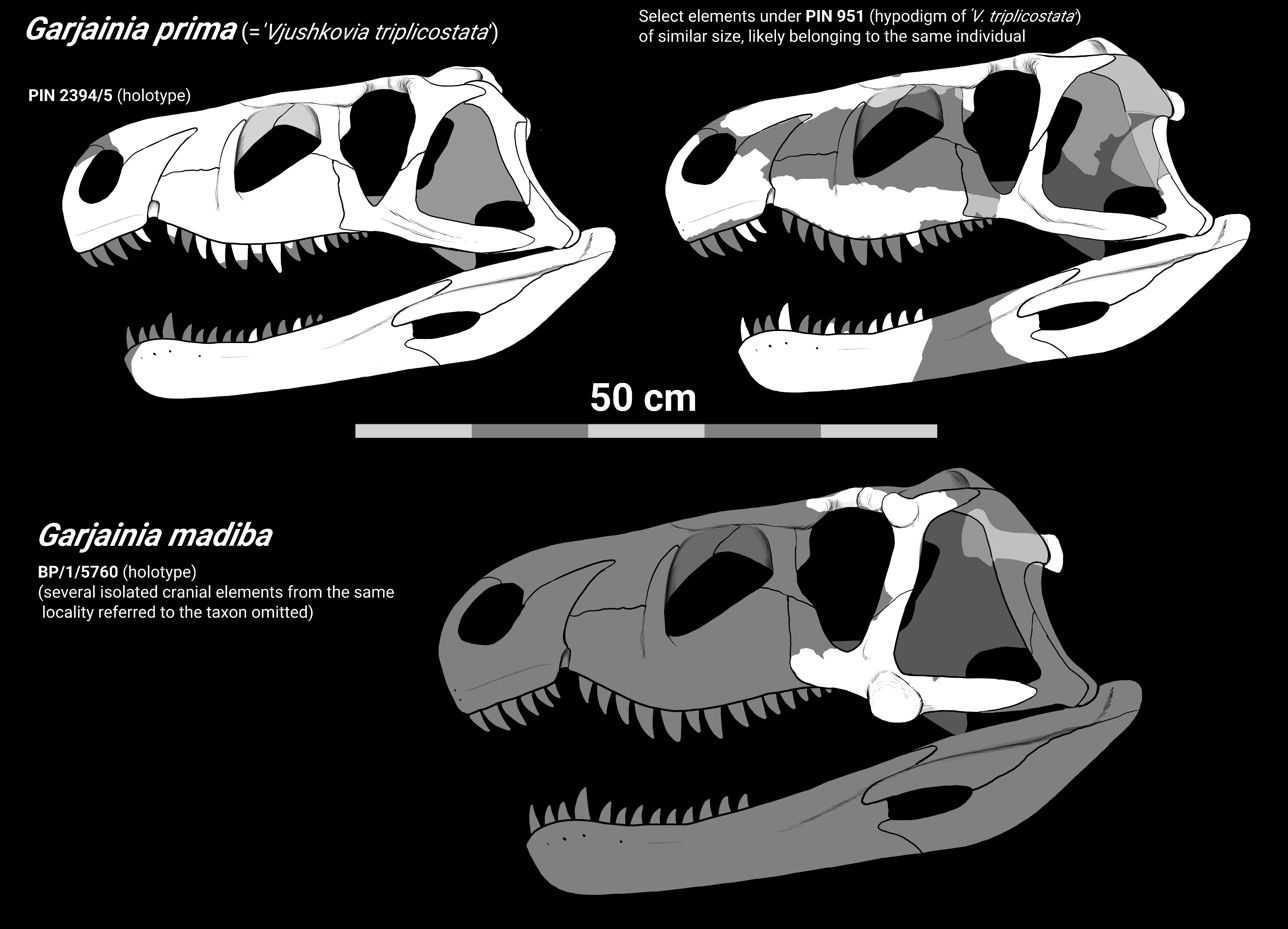
skull reconstruction of a few different specimens

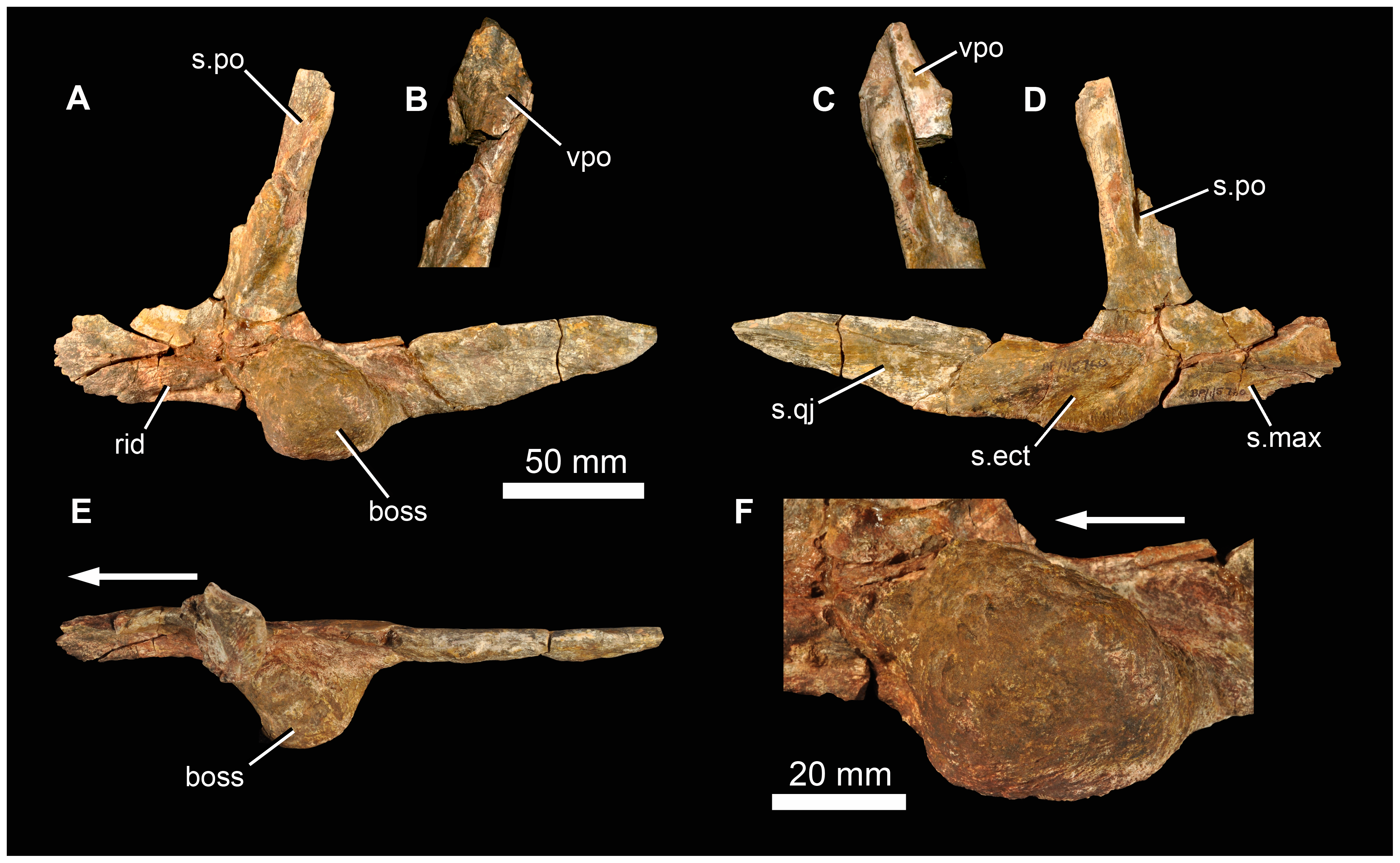
Holotype cranial material of G. madiba, showcasing the massive spherical protuberance on the jugal (boss)

Garjainia prima was first discovered in a small village in Russia by a farmer. The exact date of the discovery is not known but its believed to have been found some time in the early 1950s. A later find is G. madiba, which was found in South Africa in the 1960s as several isolated, disarticulated and fragmentary remains throughout the entire locality, referred to a singular species due to proximity. In the same locality another much larger erythrosuchid was also found, called Erythrosuchus africanus, which was one of the largest terrestrial predators of the Early Triassic (250 million years ago).

== Description ==
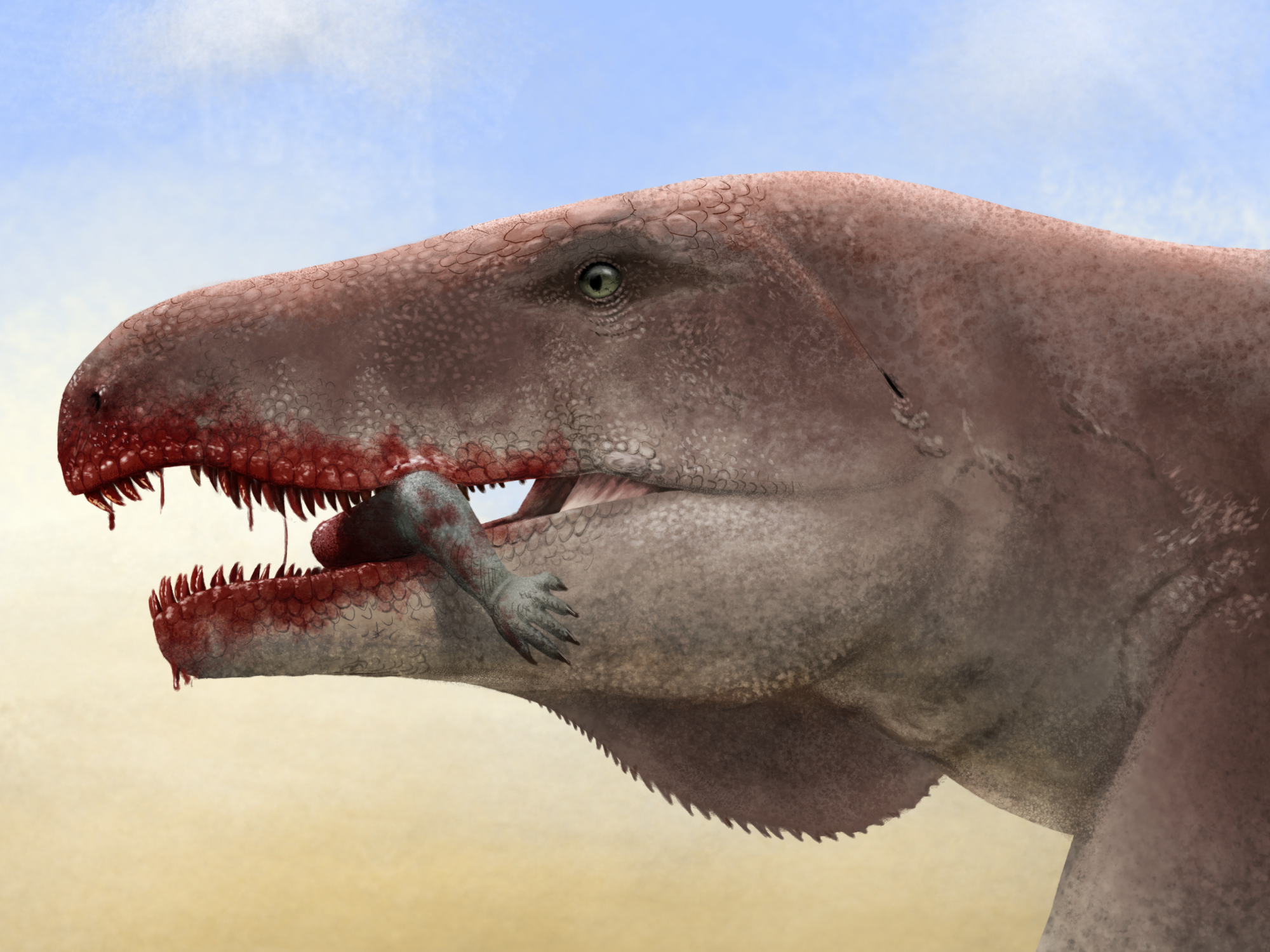
Restoration of Garjainia eating a smaller archosauromorph

Apart from its much smaller size, it was quite similar to its close relative Erythrosuchus. The skull was very large and extremely robust; the strong lower jaw was armed with robust, curved teeth, and the muzzle was high and narrow. The legs were short but sturdy, while the tail was shorter than that of other primitive archosauriforms such as Proterosuchus.The humerus was robust n Garjainia, while the shoulder blade was hourglass-shaped and the dorsal ribs were very elongated, giving the animal a high-profile. The prefrontal bones of the skull roof strongly flared laterally above and in front of the orbits, resulting in prominent "brows".

The African G. prima differs from the Russian G. madiba in the presence of large bony protuberances on the lateral surfaces of the jugal and postorbital bones. G. madiba also has more teeth and a more elongated postacetabular process of the ilium. G. madiba's bosses are unknown among other erythrosuchids. The reason that these bosses are present is unknown. Possible solutions are that they were signs of maturity or sexual dimorphism. These bosses are one of the autapomorphies of Garjainia madibaadiba.

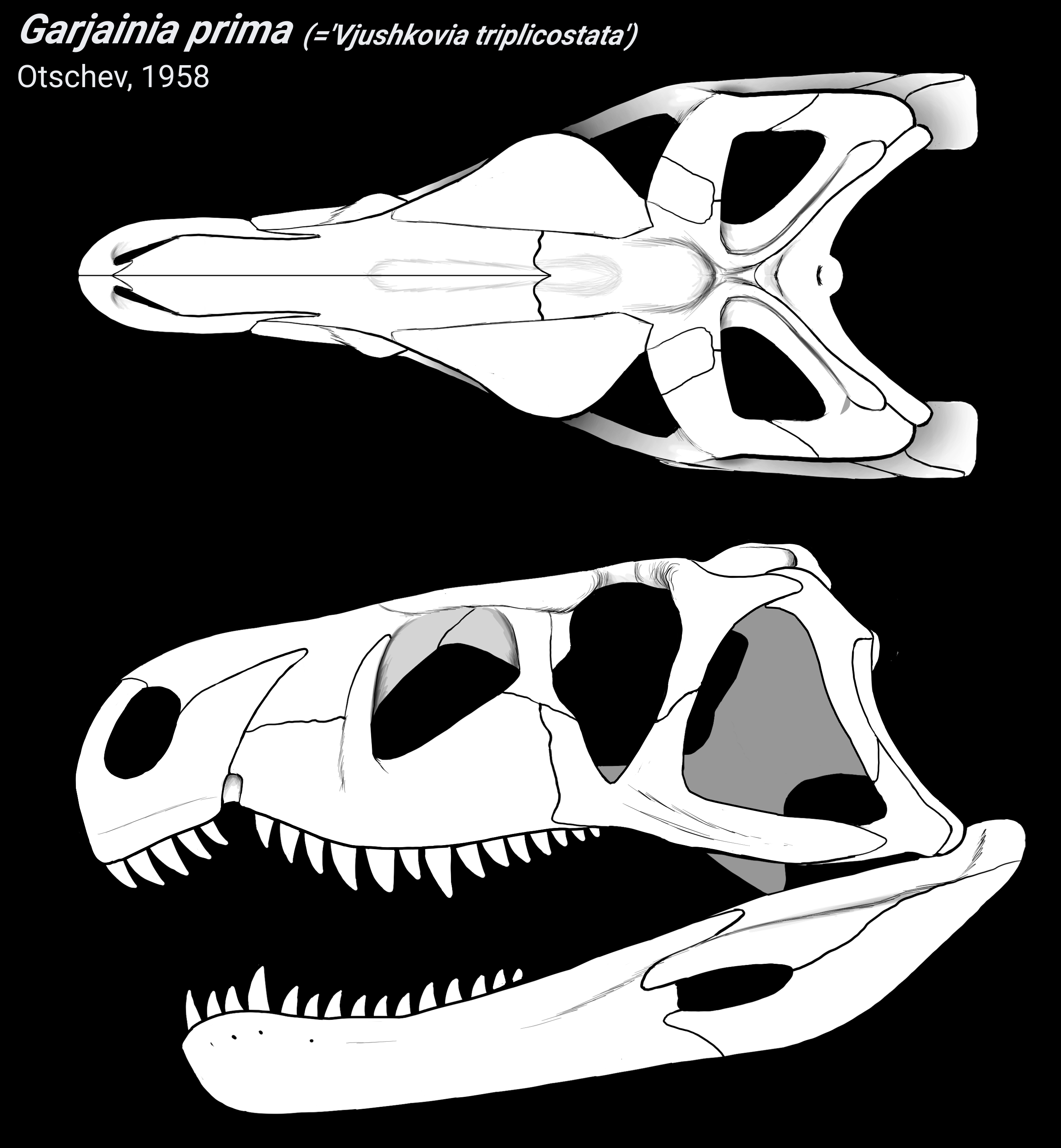
Diagram of the holotype skull in dorsal (top) and left lateral (bottom) views

== Classification ==
Garjainia was an erythrosuchid archosauriform. It was originally described by Soviet researcher VG Otschev, who classified it in its own family, Garjainidae. However, another Soviet scientist, Tatarinov, considered the genera Erythrosuchus and Garjainia to be synonymous. Garjainia has since been classified as a separate genus, part of the Erythrosuchidae. In addition, attention has been drawn to the existence of many primitive characteristics in this animal, which has led to suggestions that Garjainia represents a transitional form between the Proterosuchidae (a large, likely paraphyletic lineage) and the family Erythrosuchidae.

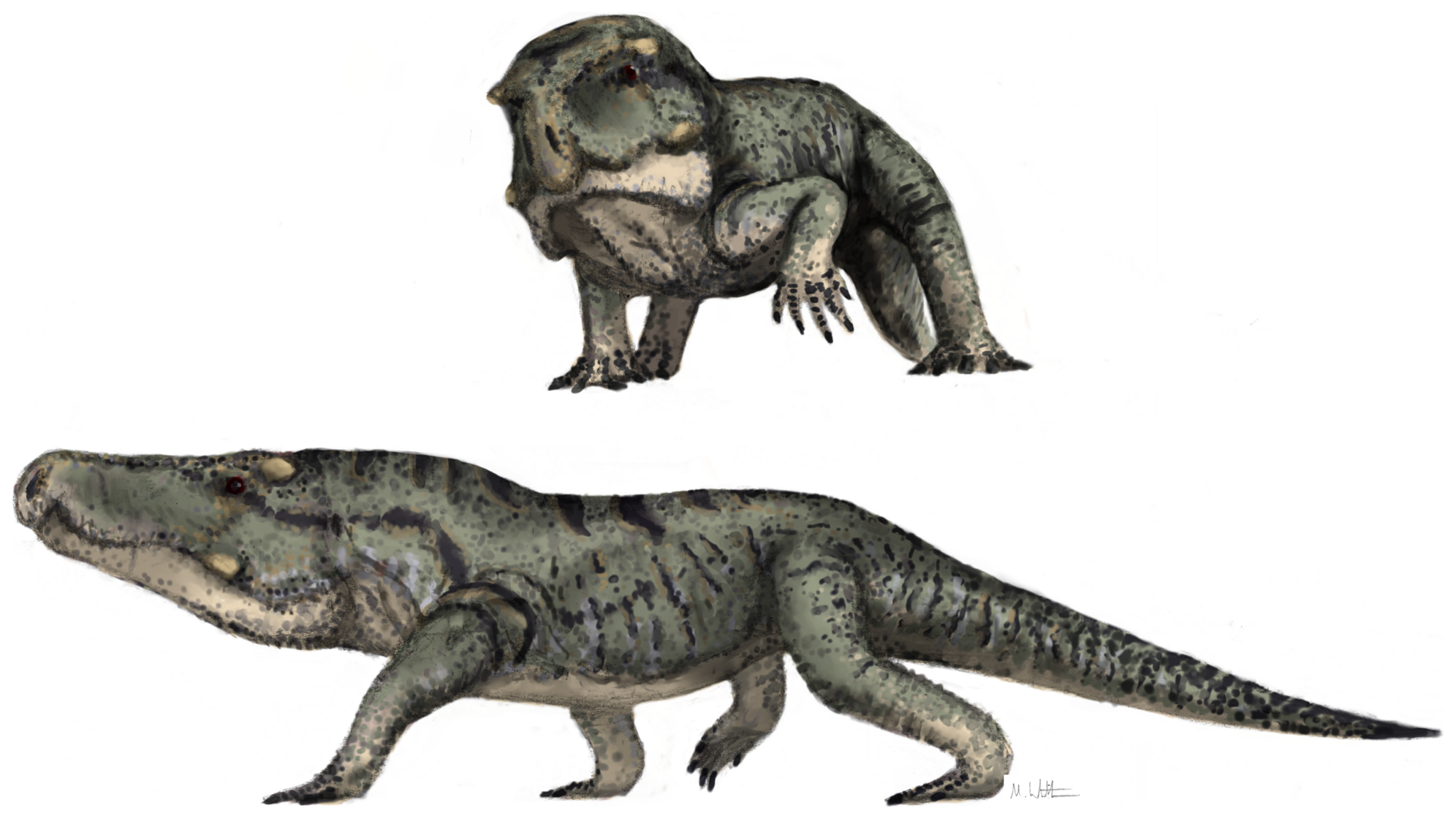
Restoration of G. madiba

Below is a cladogram based on the phylogeny of Parrish (1992).

- Archosauriformes
  - Proterosuchus
  - - Erythrosuchidae
      - - Garjainia
        - - Erythrosuchus
          - - Shansisuchus
            - Vjushkovia
      - Fugusuchus
    - Other archosauriformes
