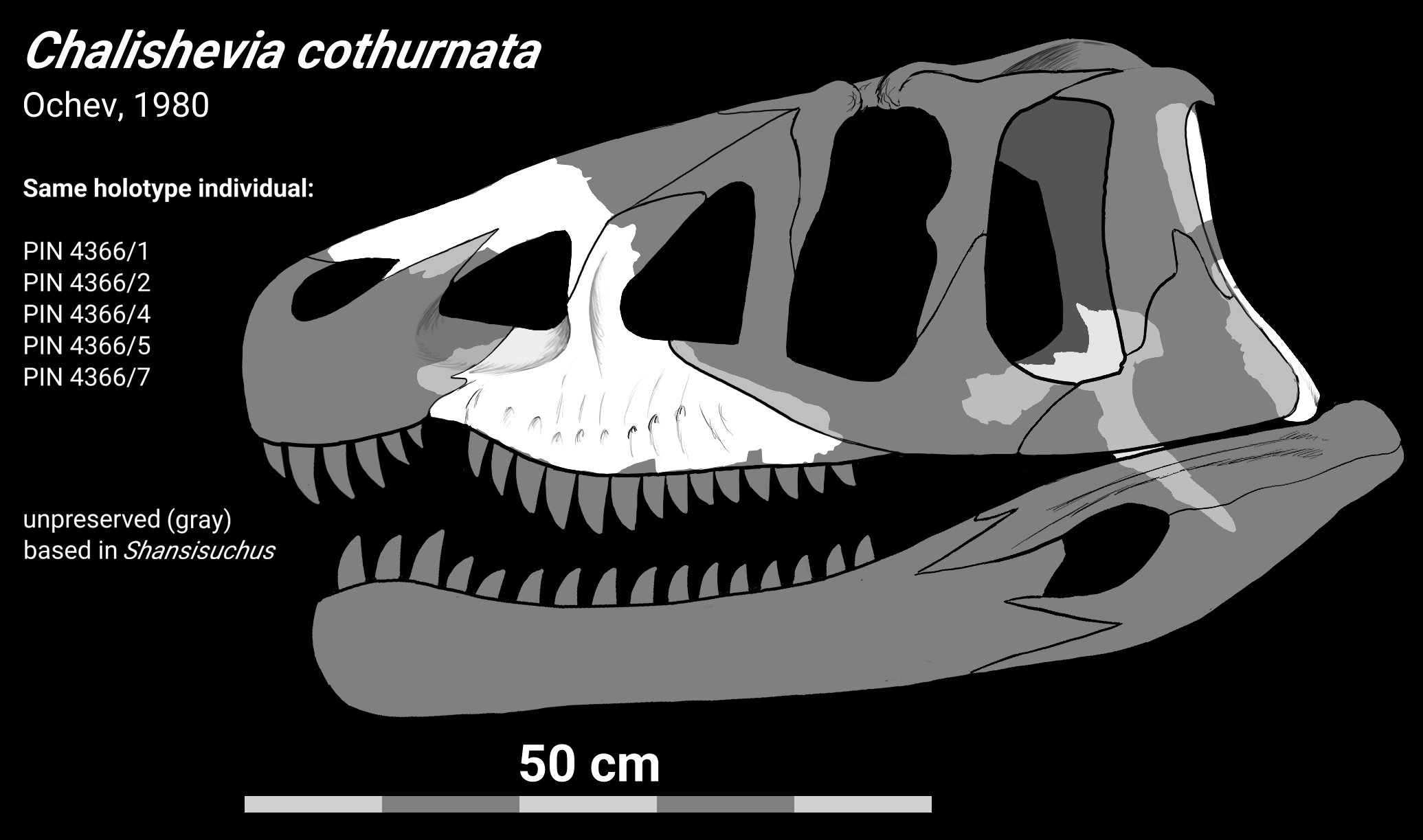
- Diagram showing the known skull remains of the holotype individual
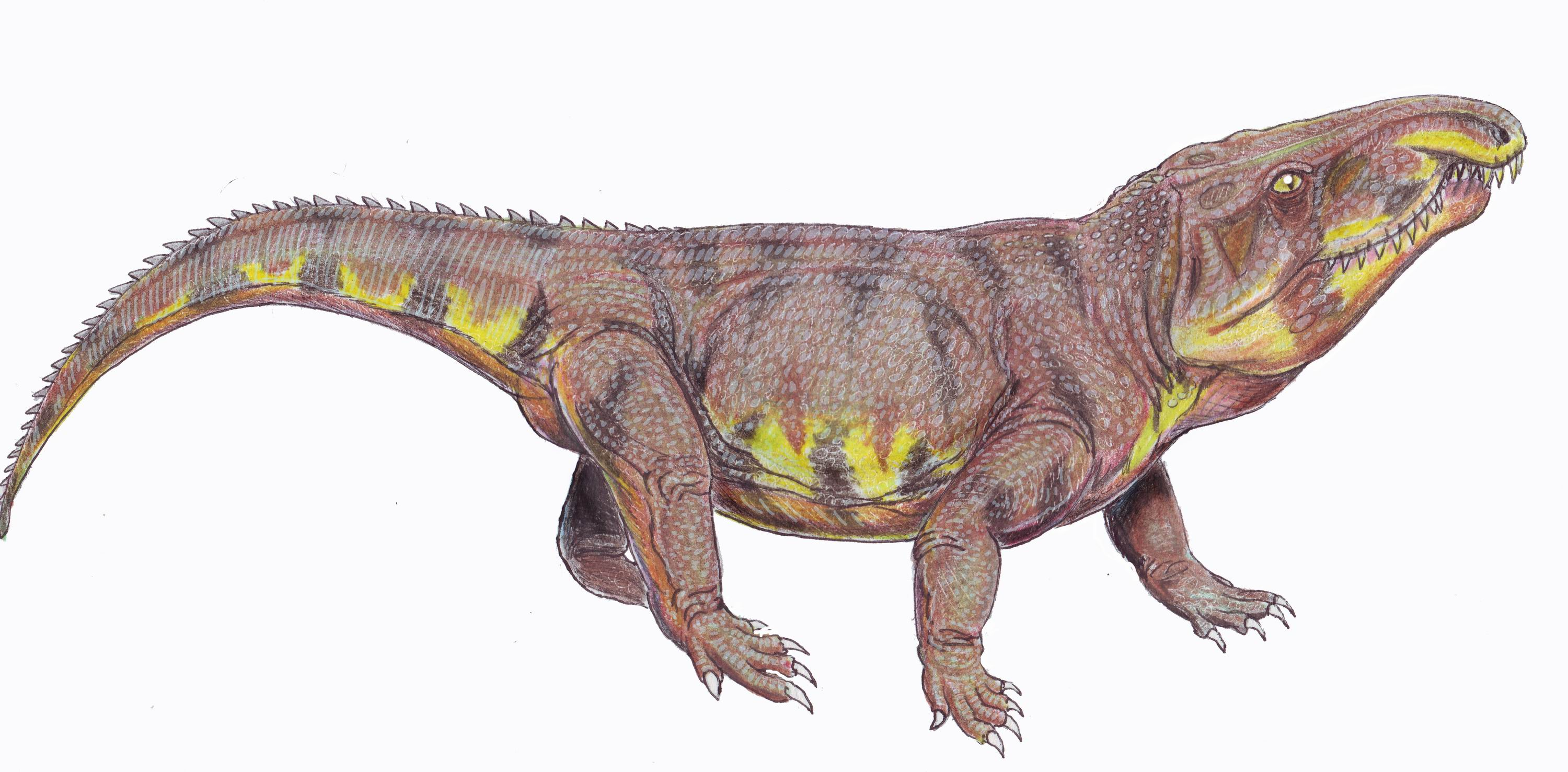
- Chalishevia

Scientific classification
- Kingdom: Animalia
- Phylum: Chordata
- Class: Reptilia
- Clade: Archosauriformes
- Family: †Erythrosuchidae
- Genus: †Chalishevia; Ochev, 1980

Species
- †C. cothurnata Ochev, 1980 (type)

= Chalishevia =

Chalishevia Temporal range: Ladinian ~242–237 Ma

Extinct genus of reptiles

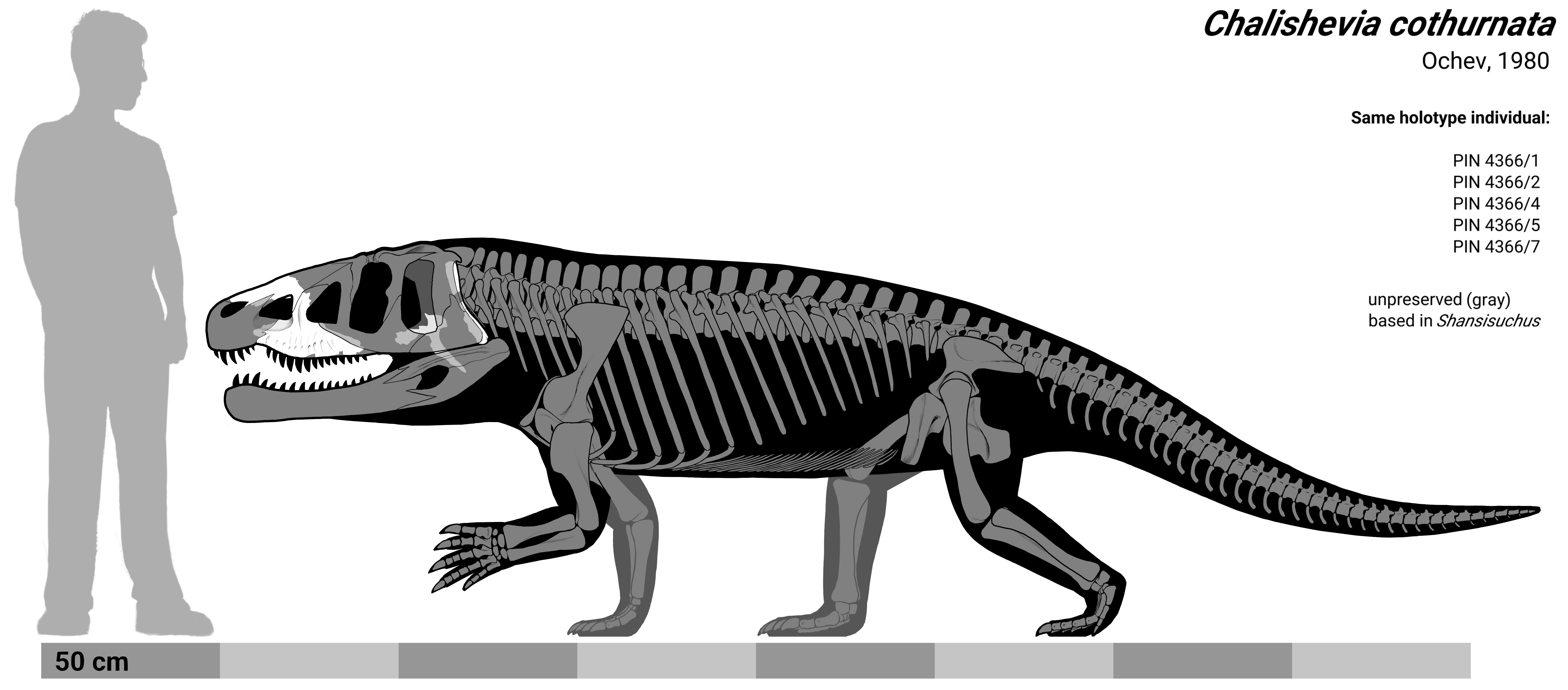
Size comparison of Chalishevia (skeletal reconstruction based from Shansisuchus)

Chalishevia is an extinct genus of erythrosuchid archosauriform (quadrupedal, large-headed terrestrial carnivore) from the Ladinian Bukobay Formation of Russia (Orenburg Oblast), likely making it the youngest known erythrosuchid in the geological time scale. Though it is only known from some fragmentary cranial material, the skull is estimated to be around 80 centimeters long, making it one of the largest erythrosuchids known.

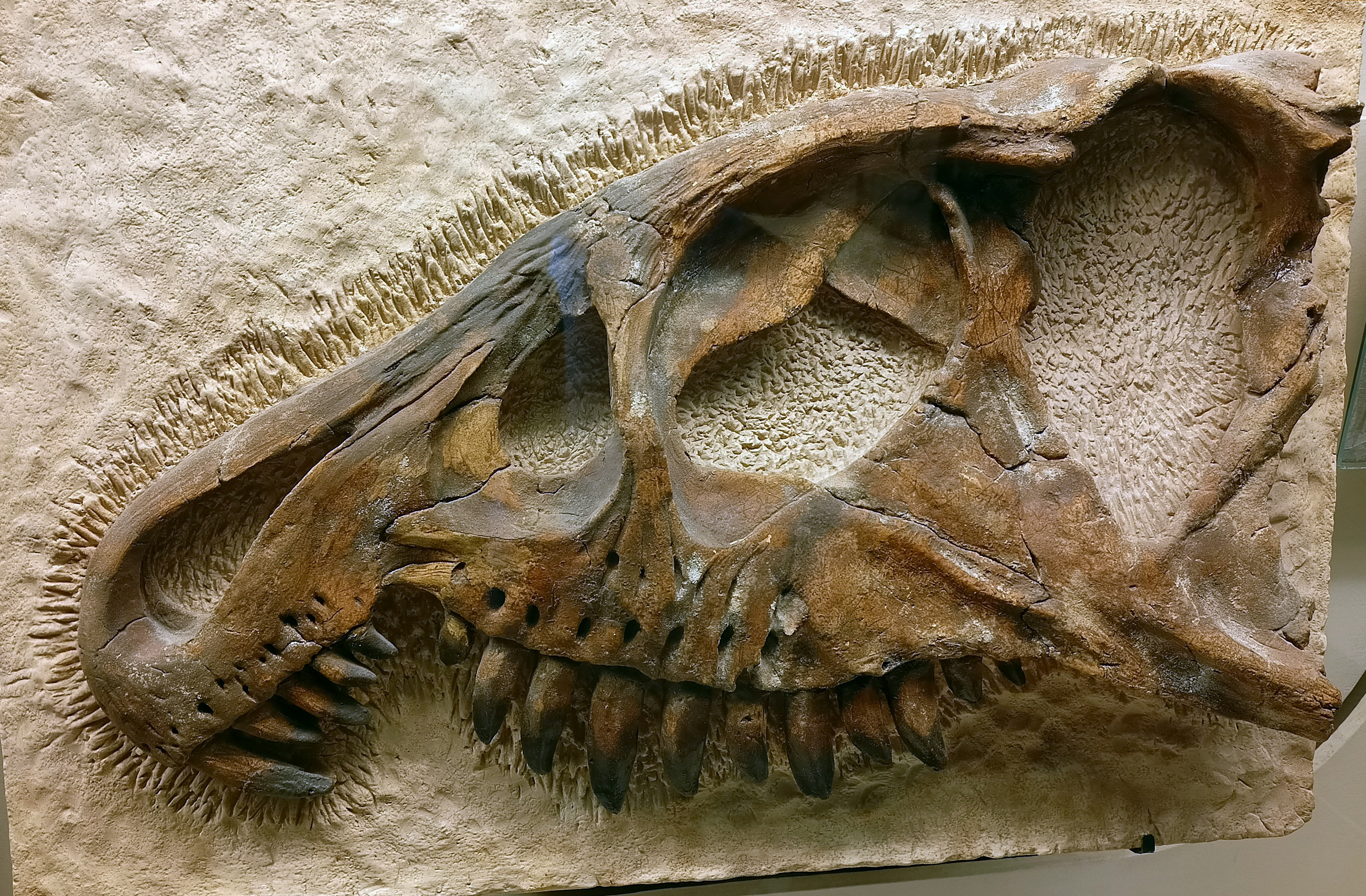
Due to a breakage in the nasal/maxilla region, these bones were previously (and likely, inaccurately) interpreted to sharply converge to each other anteriorly, resulting in a very triangular snout, and a strongly constricted region behind the premaxilla

What is known of its anatomy is very similar to that of Shansisuchus (likely indicating a close phylogenetic relationship), sharing a large additional fenestra in the skull behind the nostrils, between the premaxilla and maxilla bones, and roofed by the nasal. This fenestra has been described as the "accessory antorbital fenestra" or "sub-narial fenestra".

Besides the holotype, two bone fragments of the same part of the skull from two other different individuals have been described, one being noticeably smaller than the holotype (possibly a juvenile animal).

Several vertebrae and a jaw bone are also known near the region, but due to lack of overlap between the preserved bones of the holotype, these have been referred to Erythrosuchidae indet.
