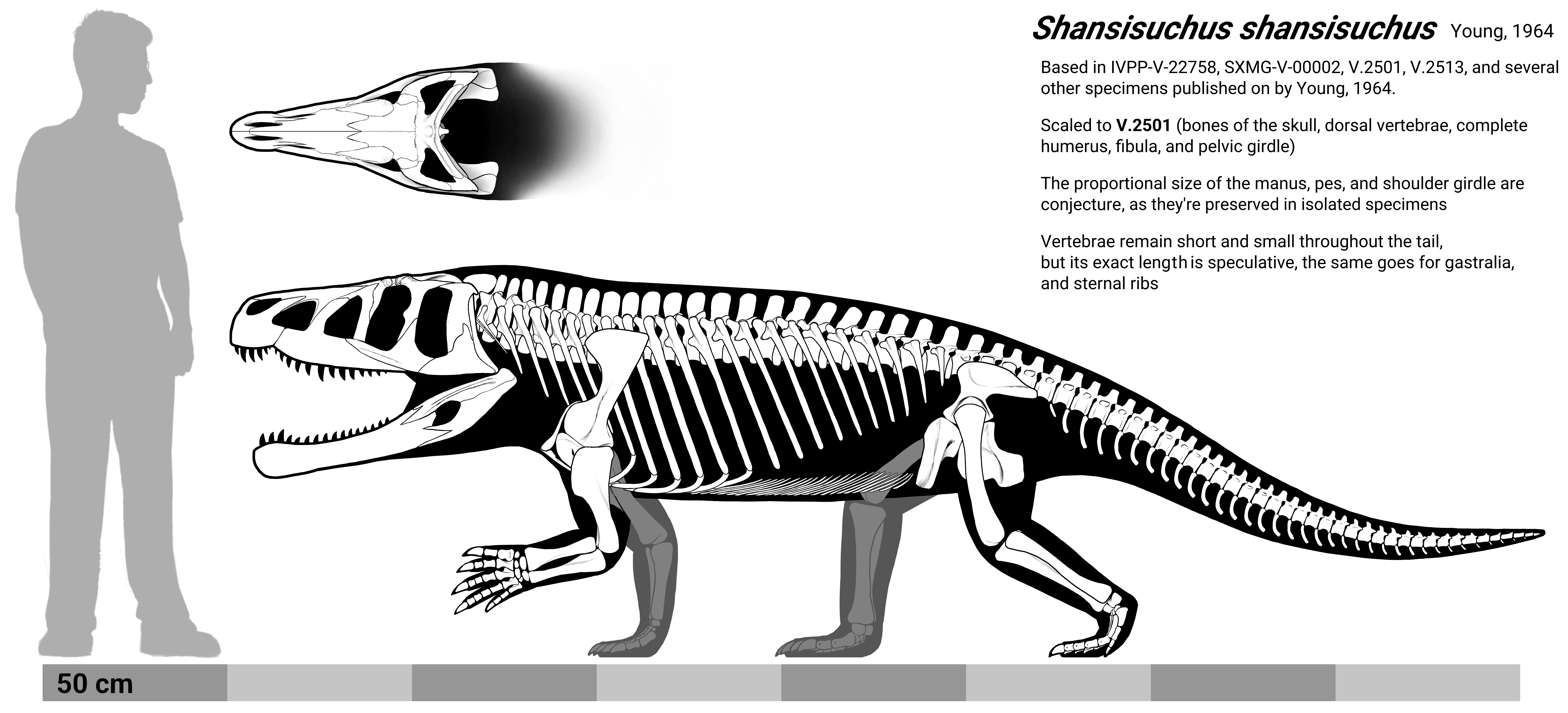
- Skeletal reconstruction based on several specimens
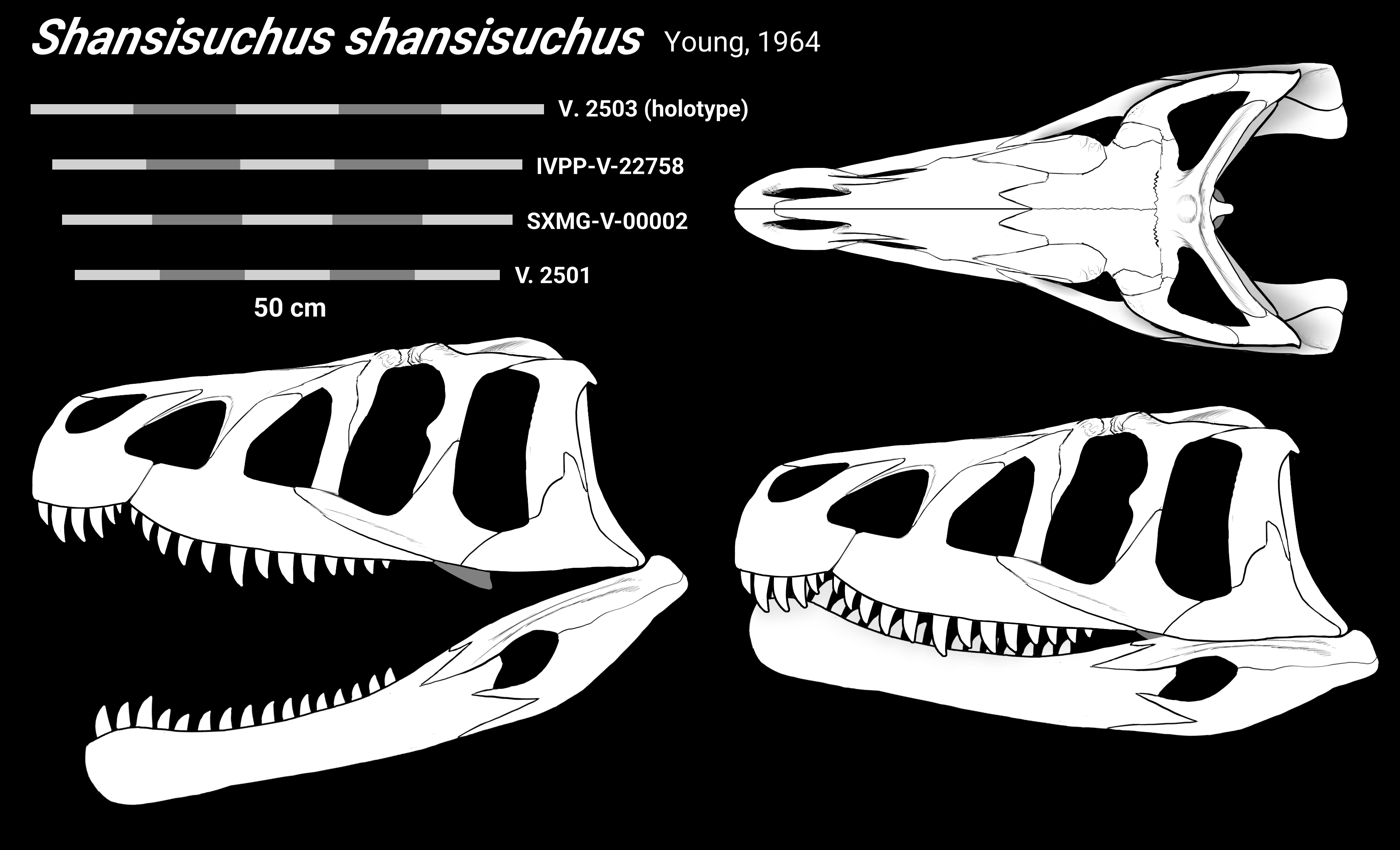
- Skull diagram

Scientific classification
- Kingdom: Animalia
- Phylum: Chordata
- Class: Reptilia
- Family: †Erythrosuchidae
- Genus: †Shansisuchus; Young, 1964

Type species
- †Shansisuchus shansisuchus Young, 1964

Species
- Shansisuchus kuyeheensis; Shansisuchus shansisuchus

= Shansisuchus =

Shansisuchus Temporal range: Middle Triassic, 247.2–242.0 Ma

Extinct genus of reptiles

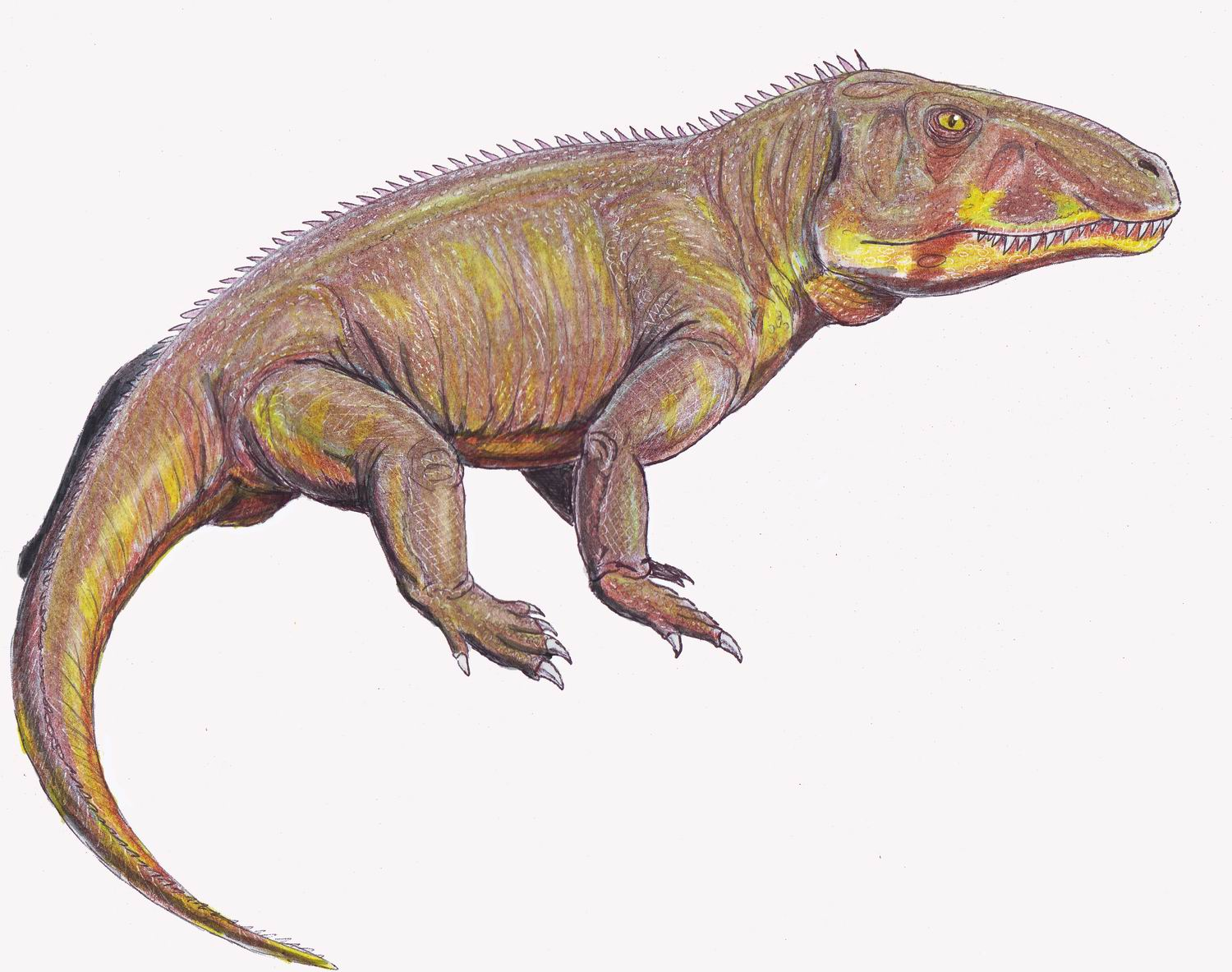
Restoration

Shansisuchus (meaning "Shanxi Province crocodile") is an extinct genus of archosauriform reptile belonging to the family Erythrosuchidae that lived during the Middle Triassic in what is now China. The first fossils of Shansisuchus were discovered from the Ermaying Formation of Shanxi (Shansi) province in 1964 by Chinese paleontologist Yang Zhongjian. Like other erythrosuchids, Shansisuchus was a large-bodied carnivore with a large, deep skull. Shansisuchus is unique among early archosauriforms in having a hole in its skull called a subnarial fenestra.

== Description ==
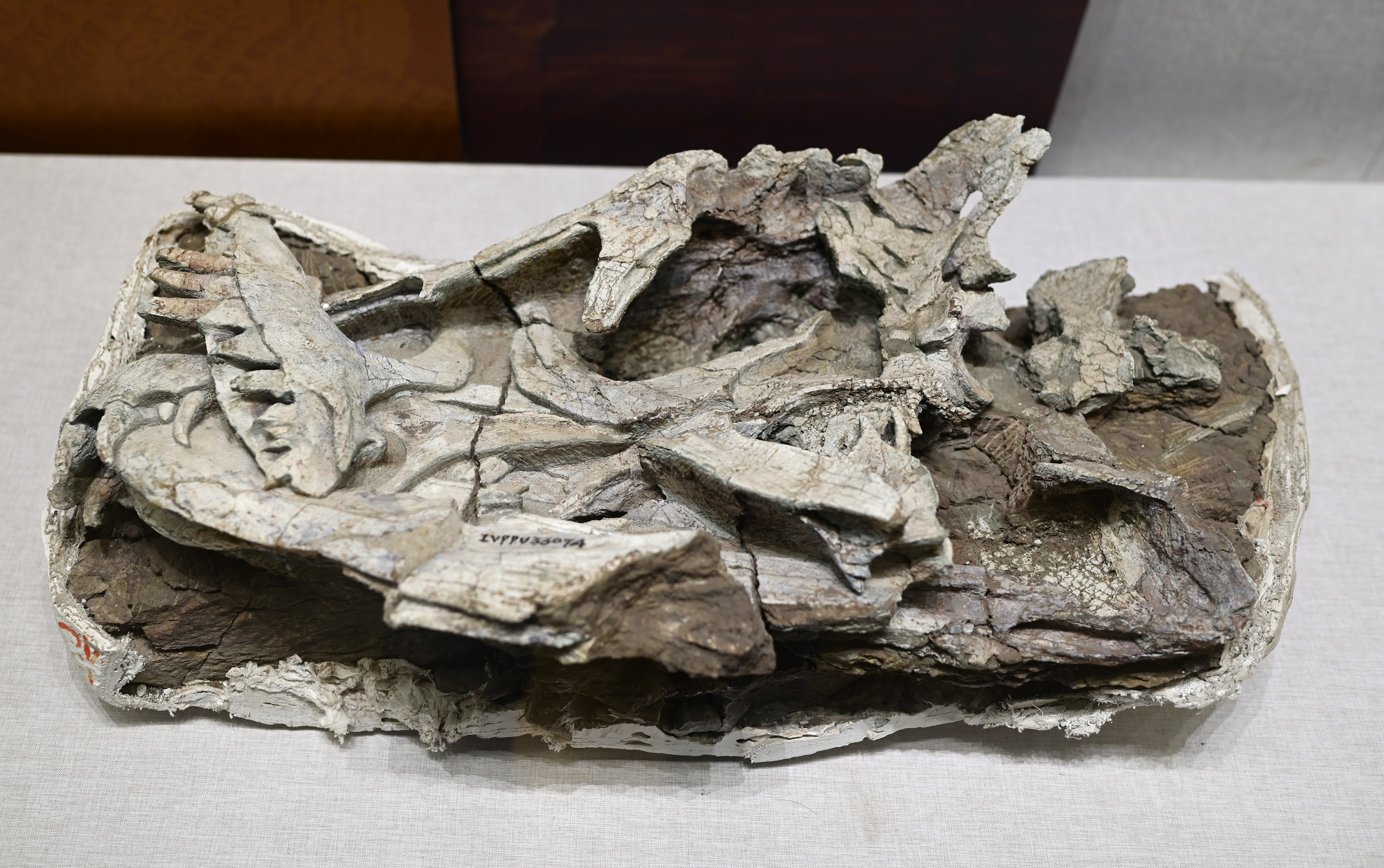
Skull at the Baoding Natural History Museum

Shansisuchus is a large erythrosuchid distinguished from other members of the group by two characters: a tongue-and-groove articulation between the premaxilla and nasal bones of the skull and the presence of a subnarial fenestra. In Shansisuchus the premaxilla, a bone that makes up the front of the snout, projects backward and fits into a groove in the nasal, a bone that makes up the top of the snout. The subnarial fenestra is present between the external nares (nasal opening) and the antorbital fenestra, a hole in front of the eye socket. It is separated from the antorbital fenestra by a vertical projection of the maxilla bone. A subnarial fenestra is present in a few other more derived archosauriforms such as some dinosaurs and pseudosuchians, but its morphology in Shansisuchus is unique. The vertebrae are very short (with centra that are taller than long), and remarkably, one articulated specimen shows the presence of pretty developed intercentra throughout the entire vertebral column; which, instead of being in-between each vertebra as usual, these were positioned ventrally and wrapped around each articulation of the centra. These adaptations would have reduced flexibility, and made the neck very stiff and strong, likely in support of its relatively large head.

== History of research ==
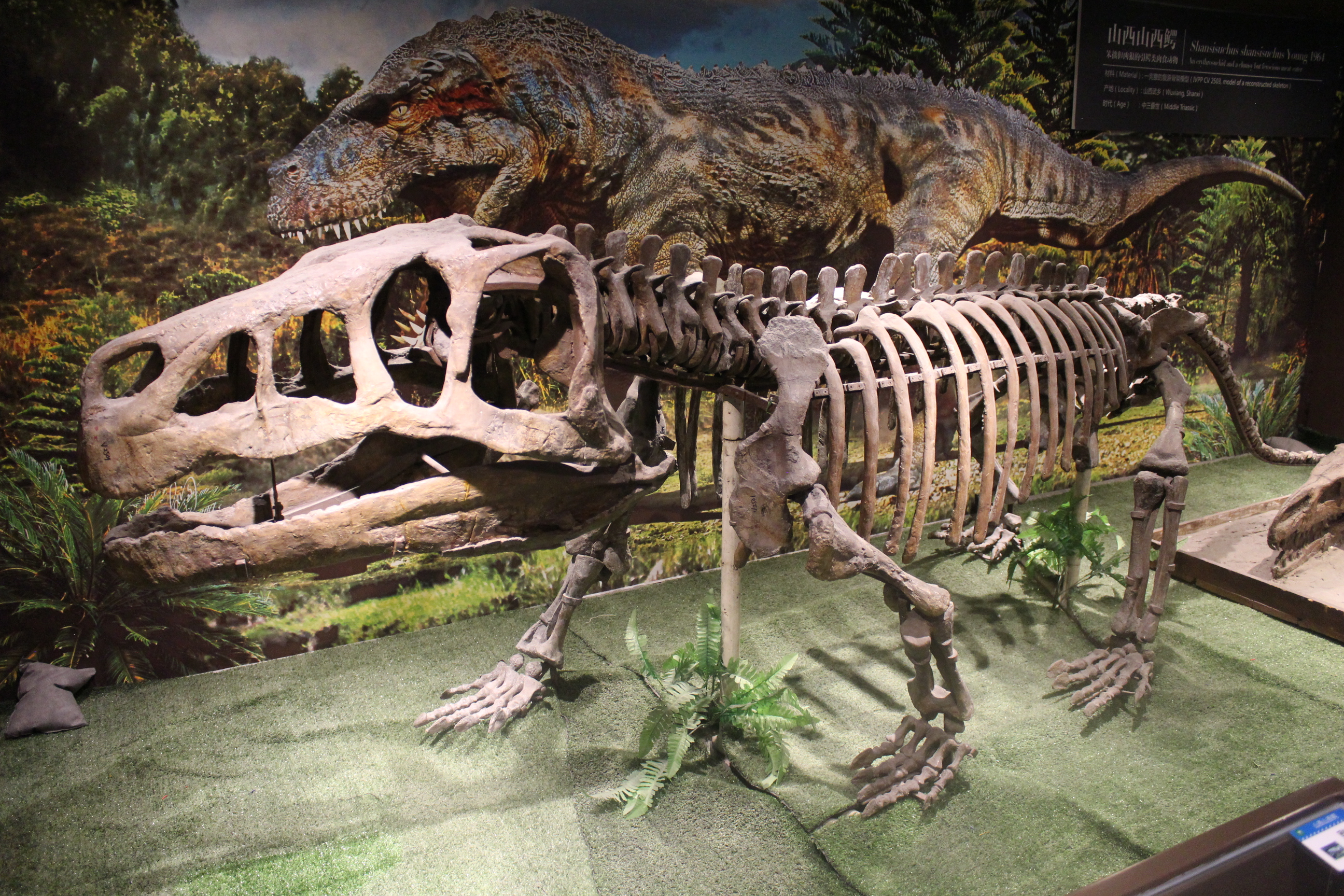
Skeletal cast mount, Paleozoological Museum of China

Shansisuchus is known from many fossil skeletons representing more than a dozen individuals, making it one of the best known erythrosuchids. However, all but one specimen discovered in 2010 (a complete skull and 14 vertebrae from Jixian County) are disarticulated, meaning that many aspects of its anatomy had been poorly understood before that specimen was described. Several skeletal cast mounts have been made with parts of differently-sized specimens, with skulls inaccurately assembled from isolated bones glued in together with plaster. Most specimens have been found in a fossil locality in Wuxiang County, and others have been found in localities in Ningwu, Yushe, Jingle, and Xing counties. Three species of Shansisuchus have been named: the type species Shansisuchus shansisuchus, which is known from over ten individuals; S. heiyuekouensis, which is known from five individuals; and S. kuyeheensis, which is known from one individual.

== Relationships ==
Shansisuchus belongs to a group of reptiles called Archosauriformes, which is today represented by crocodilians and birds but also includes a diversity of extinct forms extending back to the Late Permian. It is a basal archosauriform that lies outside Archosauria, the crown group originating with the last common ancestor of birds and crocodilians. When Shansisuchus was first described, Yang placed it in its own family, Shansisuchidae. In 1992 Shansisuchus was reassigned to the family Erythrosuchidae and proposed to be the closest relative of the genus Vjushkovia (now considered a synonym of Garjainia). A phylogenetic analysis published in 2013 found that Vjushkovia was more closely related to Erythrosuchus, and that Shansisuchus lied outside the Vjushkovia+Erythrosuchus clade as a more basal erythrosuchid. Below is a cladogram from the 2013 analysis:

- Archosauriformes
  - Proterosuchus
  - - Sarmatosuchus
    - Fugusuchus
    - - Koilamasuchus
      - Osmolskina
      - - Erythrosuchidae
          - Shansisuchus
          - - Erythrosuchus
            - Vjushkovia
        - - Euparkeria
          - - Chanaresuchus
            - Archosauria
              - Avemetatarsalia
              - Pseudosuchia
