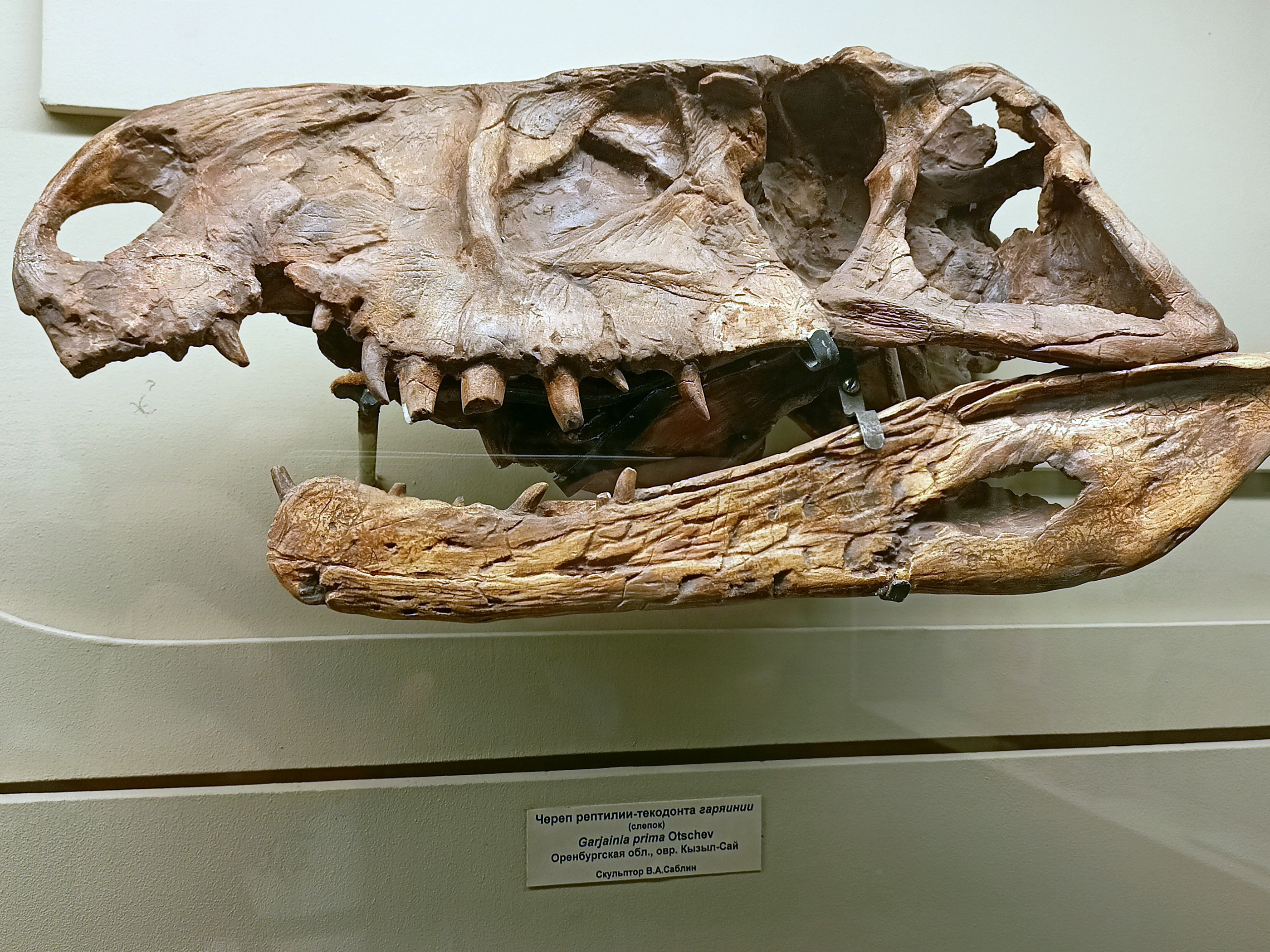
- Skull of Garjainia prima
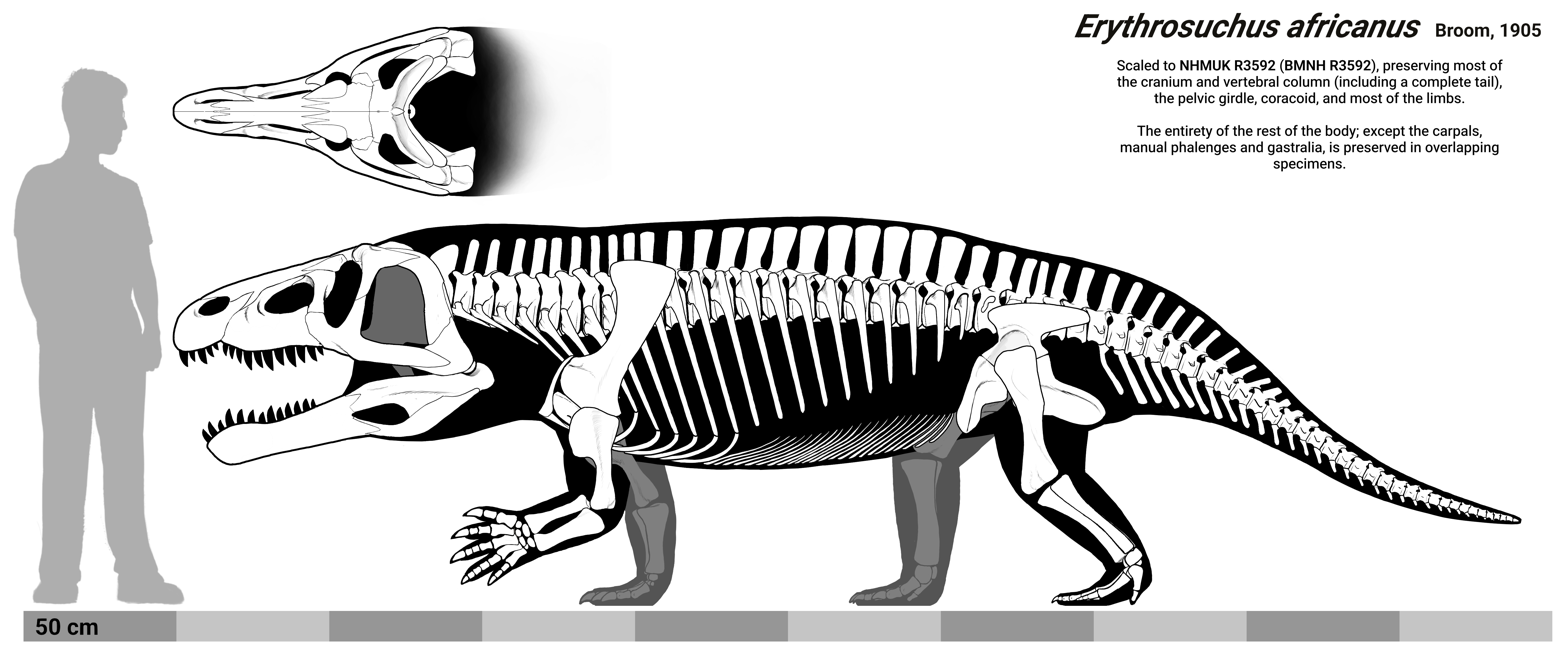
- Skeletal reconstruction of Erythrosuchus, the largest erythrosuchid

Scientific classification
- Kingdom: Animalia
- Phylum: Chordata
- Class: Reptilia
- Clade: Archosauriformes
- Family: †Erythrosuchidae; Watson, 1917

Genera
- †Bharitalasuchus; †Chalishevia; †Erythrosuchus; †Fugusuchus; †Garjainia; †Guchengosuchus; †Shansisuchus; †Uralosaurus; †Vjushkovisaurus?

= Erythrosuchidae =

Erythrosuchids Temporal range: Early – Middle Triassic, 249–237 Ma

Family of reptiles

Erythrosuchidae (meaning "red crocodiles" in Greek) are a family of large carnivorous basal archosauriforms that lived from the later Early Triassic (Olenekian) to the early Middle Triassic (Anisian). Reaching lengths of over 4 m (13 ft), they represented among the largest apex predators across Pangaea during their existence.

== Naming ==
The family Erythrosuchidae was named by David Meredith Seares Watson in 1917.

== Description ==
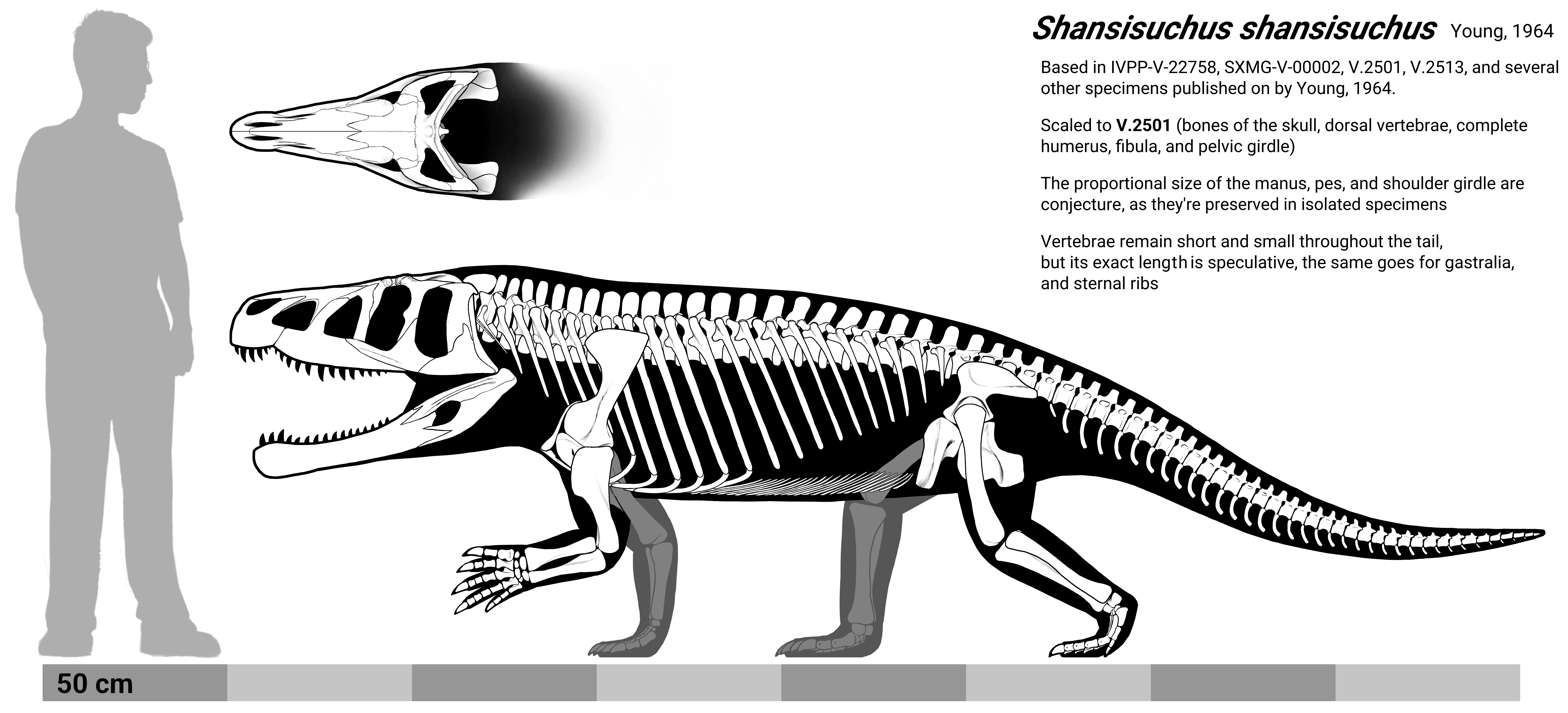
Skeletal reconstruction of Shansisuchus

They were the apex predators of their day, with lengths of 2.5 m (8 ft 2 in) to more than 4 m (13 ft), and possibly up to 5 m (16 ft) based in one isolated neural spine from Erythrosuchus. Their fossil remains are known to date from South Africa (Beaufort Group of the Karoo Basin), China, India and European Russia, from the Early to Middle Triassic.

Erythrosuchids were unusually large and robust archosauromorphs. Several features set them apart from other archosauriformes and are also seen in later, more derived archosaurs. For example, they lack teeth on the palate, which are found in other early archosauriformes, such as Doswellia and euparkeriids. In erythrosuchids, the centra (central parts of vertebrae) are deeply indented on either side, differing considerably from the usual cylindrical shape of the centra in early archosauriformes, but similar to later archosaurs.

The heads of erythrosuchids are generally disproportionately large and deep. In all erythrosuchids, the lower margin of the premaxilla, the bone at the tip of the upper jaw, is lower than the lower margin of the maxilla, the bone behind the premaxilla. This forms a characteristic "step" that makes erythrosuchids easily distinguishable from all other early archosauriformes, which have smooth jaw margins that are either straight or gradually curved.

Erythrosuchids are notable for being the first archosauriforms to have a triradiate pelvic girdle with three projecting areas formed from three bones: an ilium and an elongated pubis and ischium. Although it is small, the fourth trochanter, a ridge on the femur that serves as a muscle attachment in archosaurs, first appears in erythrosuchids. The triradiate pelvis and fourth trochanter are both features which indicate that erythrosuchids had an erect stance similar to later archosaurs. More basal archosauriforms such as proterosuchids lacked these features and probably had a more sprawling posture.

== Classification ==
Erythrosuchids were formerly classified as thecodonts of the suborder Proterosuchia. This classification is no longer used by paleontologists, who now employ a cladistic approach. In this, erythrosuchids constitute an Archosauriformes clade that is an outgroup to the Archosauria proper. The presence of certain archosaurian features, such as the triradiate pelvic girdle, the fourth trochanter, and the third metatarsal longer than the fourth, indicate that erythrosuchids are closer to the true archosaurs than the Proterosuchidae, which lack these features. Thus the Erythrosuchidae occupy a transitional evolutionary position between the most primitive archisauriformes and more advanced Triassic archosaurs. The family was defined by Martin Ezcurra and colleagues in 2010 during the description of Koilamasuchus as "all taxa more closely related to Erythrosuchus africanus than to Proterosuchus fergusi or Passer domesticus (the house sparrow).

=== Genera ===
Genus	Status	Age	Location	Description	Images
Bharitalasuchus	Valid	Middle Triassic	India		
Chalishevia	Valid	Middle Triassic	European Russia		
Erythrosuchus	Valid	Early -Middle-Triassic	South Africa		
Fugusuchus	Valid	Early Triassic	China		
Garjainia	Valid	Early Triassic	European Russia and South Africa		
Guchengosuchus	Valid	Early Triassic	China		
Shansisuchus	Valid	Middle Triassic	China		
Uralosaurus	Valid	Middle Triassic	European Russia		
?Vjushkovisaurus	Valid	Middle Triassic	European Russia		

=== Phylogeny ===
Cladogram from Parrish (1992):

- Archosauriformes
  - Proterosuchus
  - - Erythrosuchidae
      - - Garjainia
        - - Erythrosuchus
          - - Shansisuchus
            - Vjushkovia
      - Fugusuchus
    - Other archosauriformes

Below is a cladogram from Ezcurra (2016) that reexamined all historical members of the "Proterosuchia" (a polyphyletic historical group including proterosuchids and erythrosuchids). The placement of fragmentary taxa that had to be removed to increase tree resolution is indicated by dashed lines (in the most derived position that they can be confidently assigned to). Taxa that are nomina dubia are indicated by the note "dubium". Bold terminal taxa are collapsed. Ezcurra (2016) recovered a monophyletic Erythrosuchidae, although the relationship of the Long Reef form (SAM P41754) and Uralosaurus remain unknown within the family.

- - Prolacertidae
  - - SAM-PK-591
    - "Ankistrodon indicus" (dubium)
    - "Blomosuchus georgii" (dubium)
    - Tasmaniosaurus triassicus
    - Archosauriformes
      - Chasmatosuchus
        - Chasmatosuchus magnus
        - Chasmatosuchus rossicus
        - Gamosaurus lozovskii
      - Chasmatosuchus vjushkovi
      - Vonhuenia friedrichi
      - Proterosuchidae
      - - Eorasaurus olsoni
        - Kalisuchus rewanensis
        - Fugusuchus hejiapanensis
        - - Sarmatosuchus otschevi
          - - Cuyosuchus huenei
            - - Erythrosuchidae
                - SAM P41754
                - Uralosaurus magnus
                - Guchengosuchus shiguaiensis
                - - - GHG 7433MI
                    - Garjainia madiba
                    - Garjainia prima
                  - - Erythrosuchus africanus
                    - - Chalishevia cothurnata
                      - Shansisuchus kuyeheensis
                      - Shansisuchus shansisuchus
              - Eucrocopoda (=other archosauriformes)

== Paleobiology ==
The large contemporary kannemeyeriid dicynodonts doubtless constituted much of erythrosuchids' prey. However, the first erythrosuchids appear in the fossil record slightly earlier than the kannemeyeriids, so it must be assumed that they fed on other animals as well.

== Sources ==
- Benton, M. J. (2000), Vertebrate Paleontology, 2nd Ed. Blackwell Science Ltd (2004) 3rd edition
- Carroll, R. L. (1988), Vertebrate Paleontology and Evolution, WH Freeman & Co.
