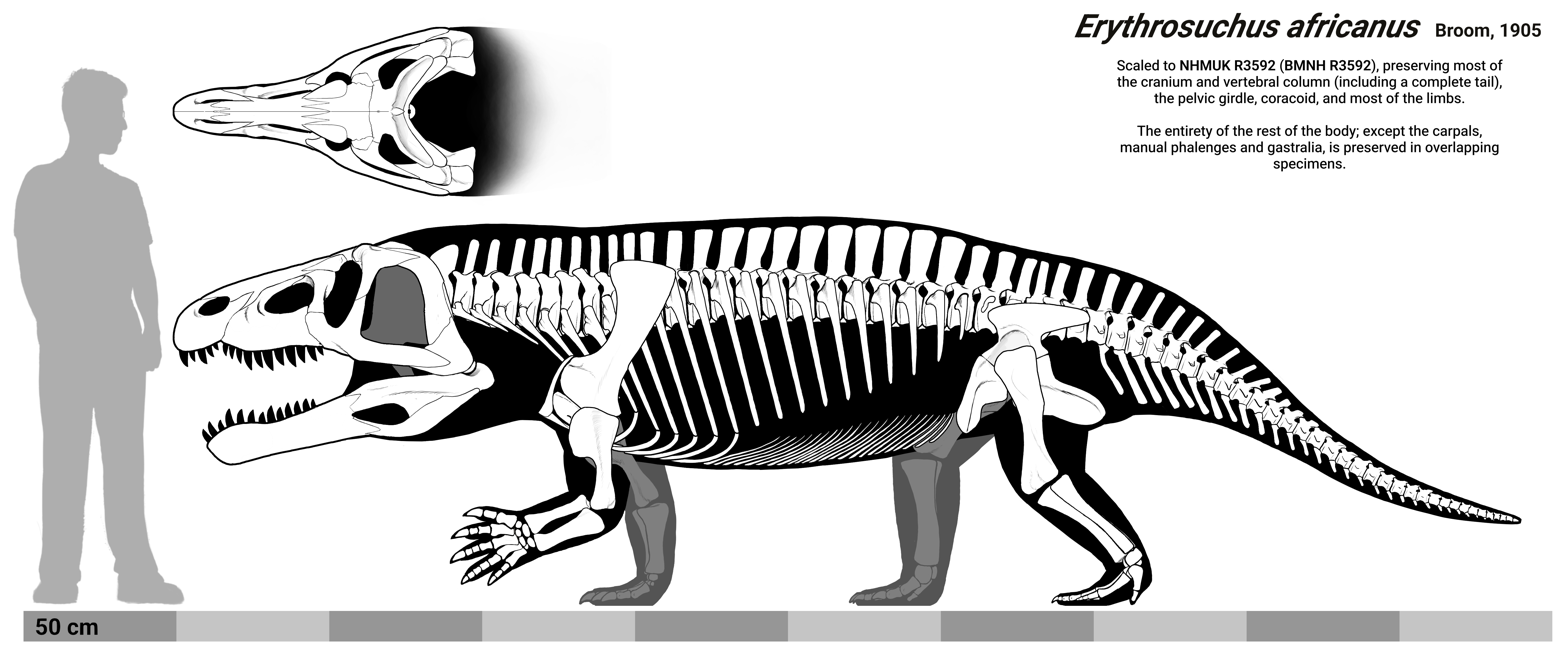
- Skeletal reconstruction based on the large, most complete specimen (NHMUK 3592)
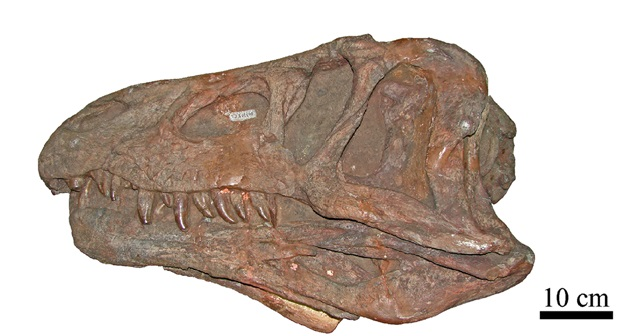
- Skull of Erythrosuchus (specimen BPI 5207)

Scientific classification
- Kingdom: Animalia
- Phylum: Chordata
- Class: Reptilia
- Clade: Crocopoda
- Clade: Archosauriformes
- Family: †Erythrosuchidae
- Genus: †Erythrosuchus; Broom, 1905

Type species
- Erythrosuchus africanus Broom, 1905

= Erythrosuchus =

Erythrosuchus Temporal range: 249–244 Ma Early to Middle Triassic

Extinct genus of reptiles

Erythrosuchus (from Greek: ἐρυθρός eruthrós, 'red' and Greek: σοῦχος soukhos, 'crocodile') is an extinct genus of archosauriform reptiles from the early to middle Triassic of South Africa. Remains have been found in the Cynognathus Assemblage Zone of the Beaufort Group in the Karoo of South Africa. In the Late Triassic, the ecological niche left by Erythrosuchus was filled by archosaurs including "rauisuchians".

== Description ==
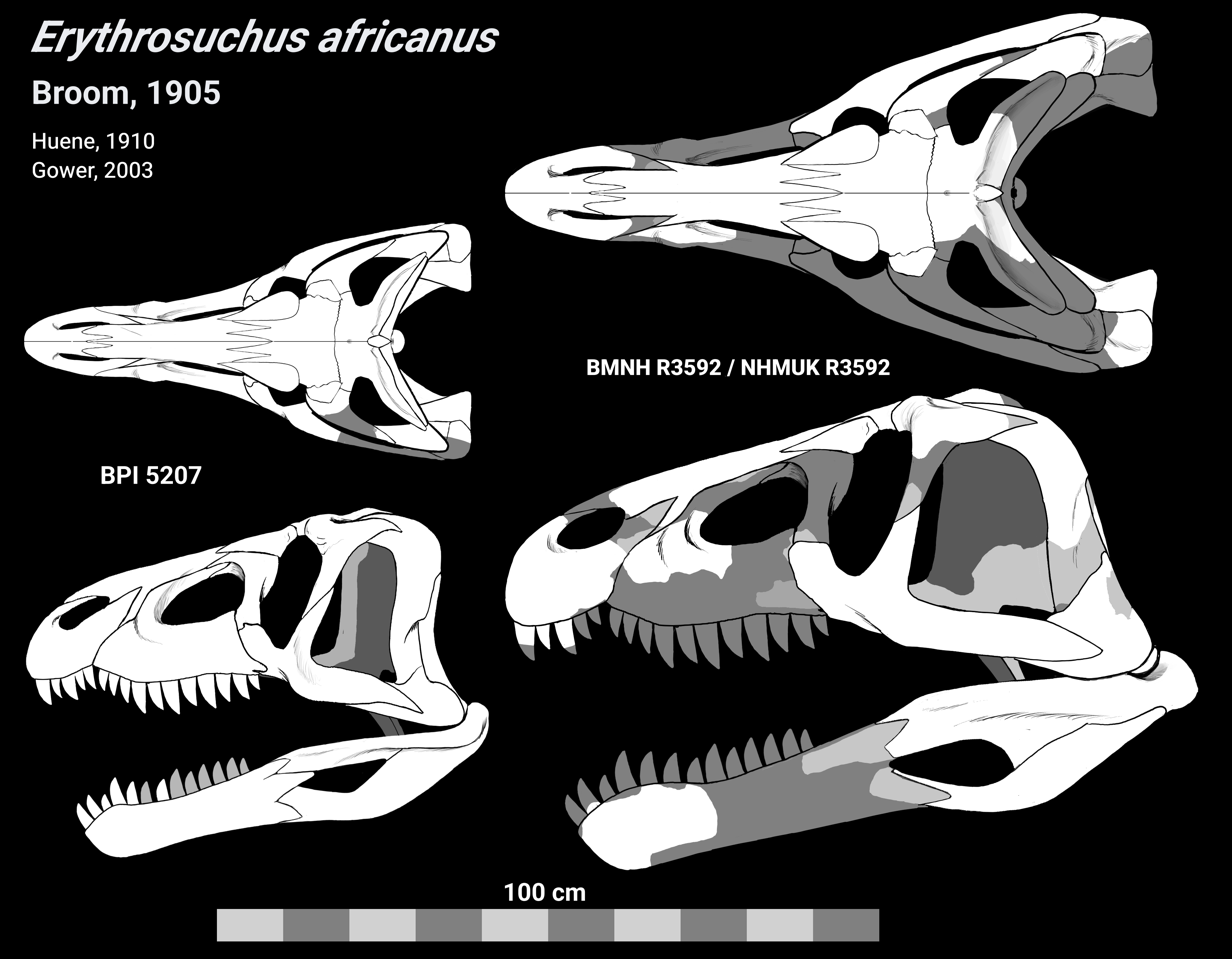
Skull diagrams of two specimens

Erythrosuchus was the largest predator of its time, at more than 4 meters (13.1 ft) in length, with a singular neural arch suggesting possible lengths of 4.75–5 m (15.6–16.4 ft). It walked on all fours and had limbs positioned semi-vertically under its body, unlike the more sprawling gait of most earlier reptiles. Its head was large and theropod-like, possibly able to reach a length of 1 m (3.3 ft), and had sharp, conical teeth.

Erythrosuchus was the largest erythrosuchid, but apart from its size, was largely similar in appearance to other related genera. It had a large head and comparatively short neck. One of the few distinguishing features of Erythrosuchus is the smoothness of the margin of the squamosal, a bone at the rear of the skull. In other erythrosuchids, the margin of this bone projects backward from the skull, giving it a hook-like appearance. In Erythrosuchus, the margin is convex and lacks a hook.

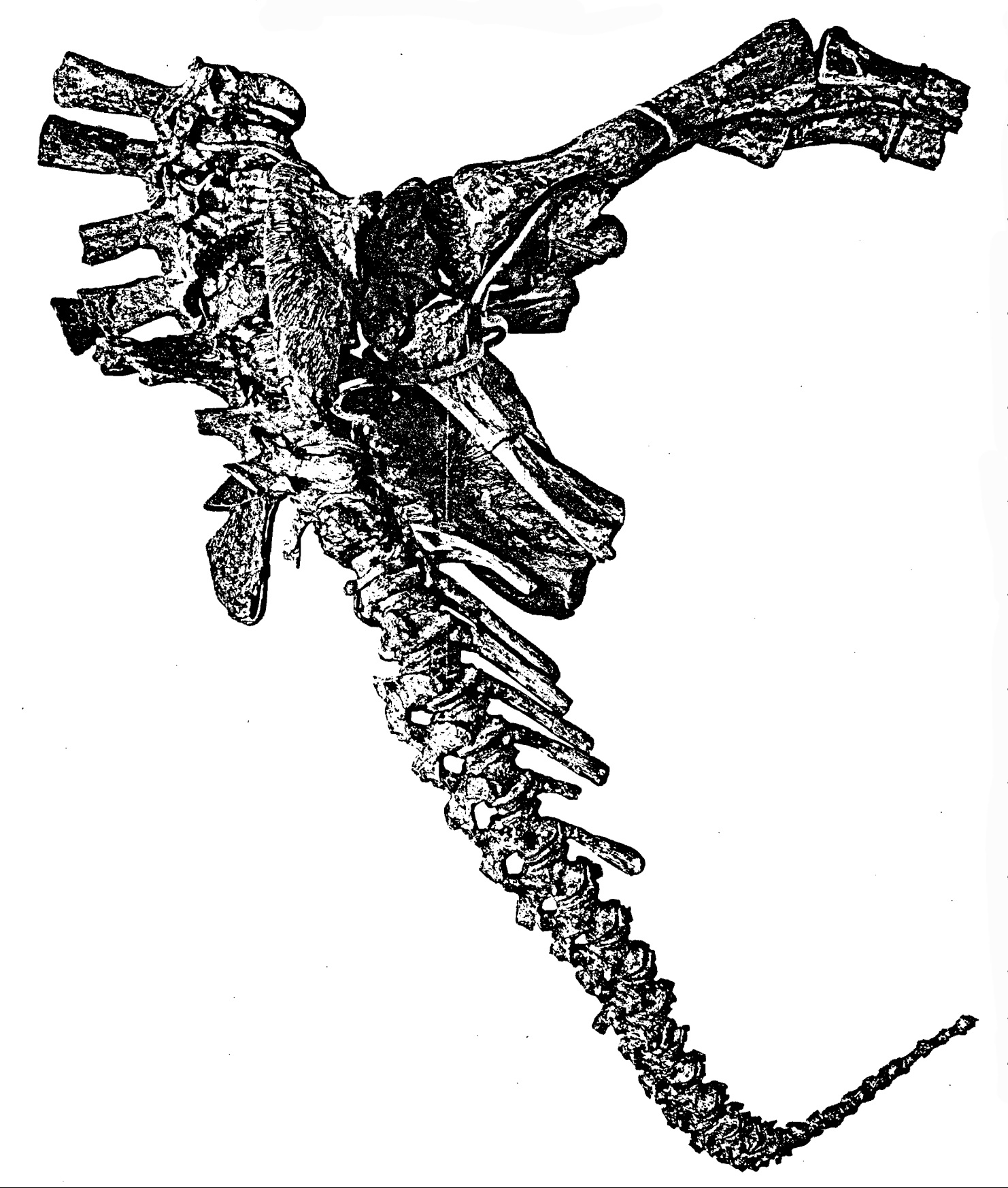
Illustration of a specimen's partial postcrania as it was found, showcasing a complete tail

All the vertebrae were robust and short (being taller than long), and possessed intercentra between them throughout the column, adding strength and stiffness. One very complete specimen (BMNH R3592, among the largest known of the genus) preserves the entirety of its tail, showing 35 individual caudal vertebrae that diminished in size throughout its length, resulting in a comparatively very small tail

== Discovery ==
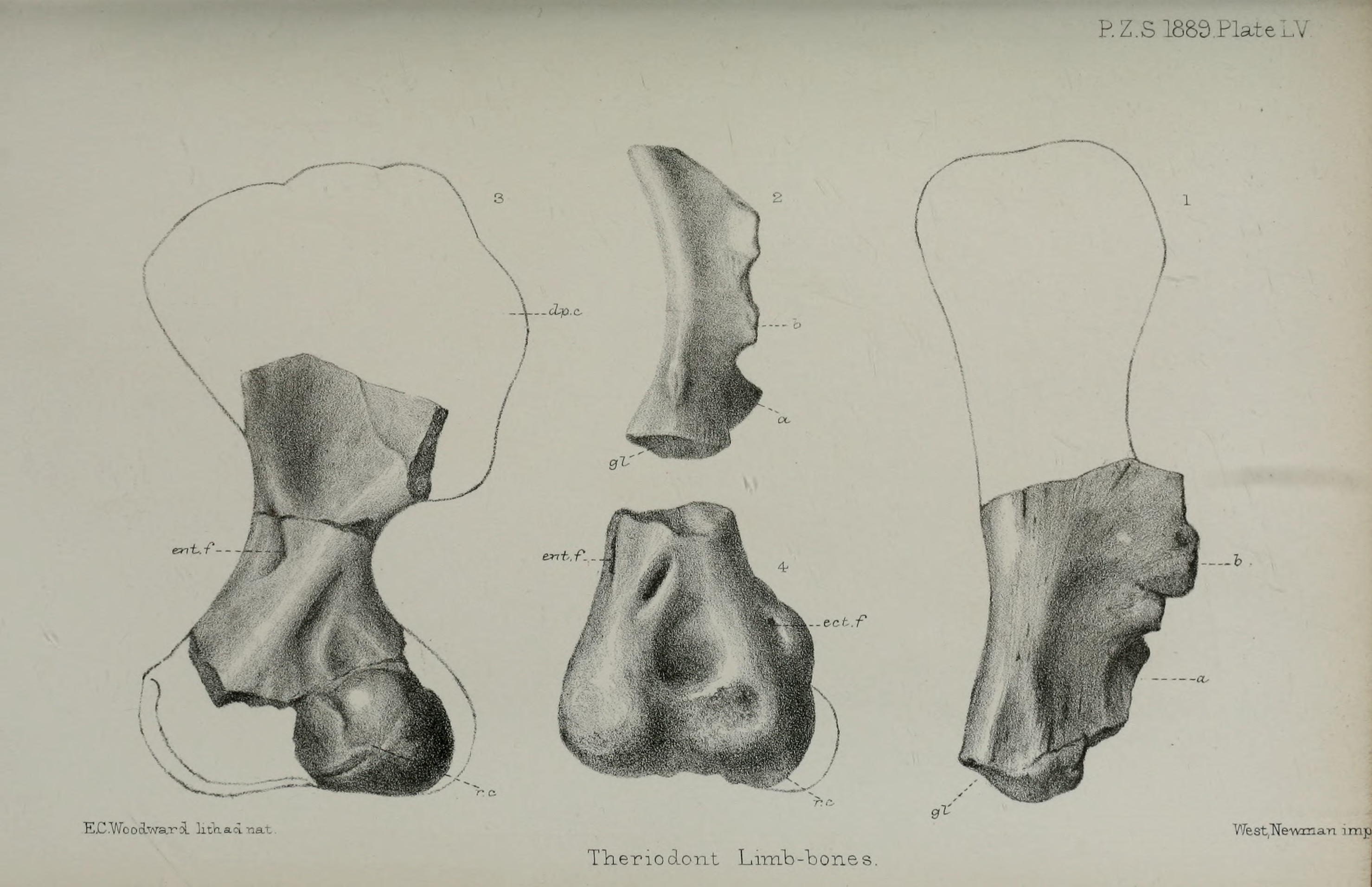
Fossils, 1 and 3

Erythrosuchus is known from many specimens, most of which are fragmentary. The holotype, described by Robert Broom in 1905 and known as SAM 905, is poorly preserved. Only small pieces of the limbs, pectoral and pelvic girdles, skull, and a few vertebrae are present in this specimen. A thorough description of the genus was given by German paleontologist Friedrich von Huene in 1911. The fossil material that served as the basis for the description is now housed in the Natural History Museum in London. Like the holotype, it is very fragmentary, and some specimens may even belong to the same individual as SAM 905. One specimen, known as NHMUK PV R 3592, is relatively more complete, with much of the postcranial skeleton intact.

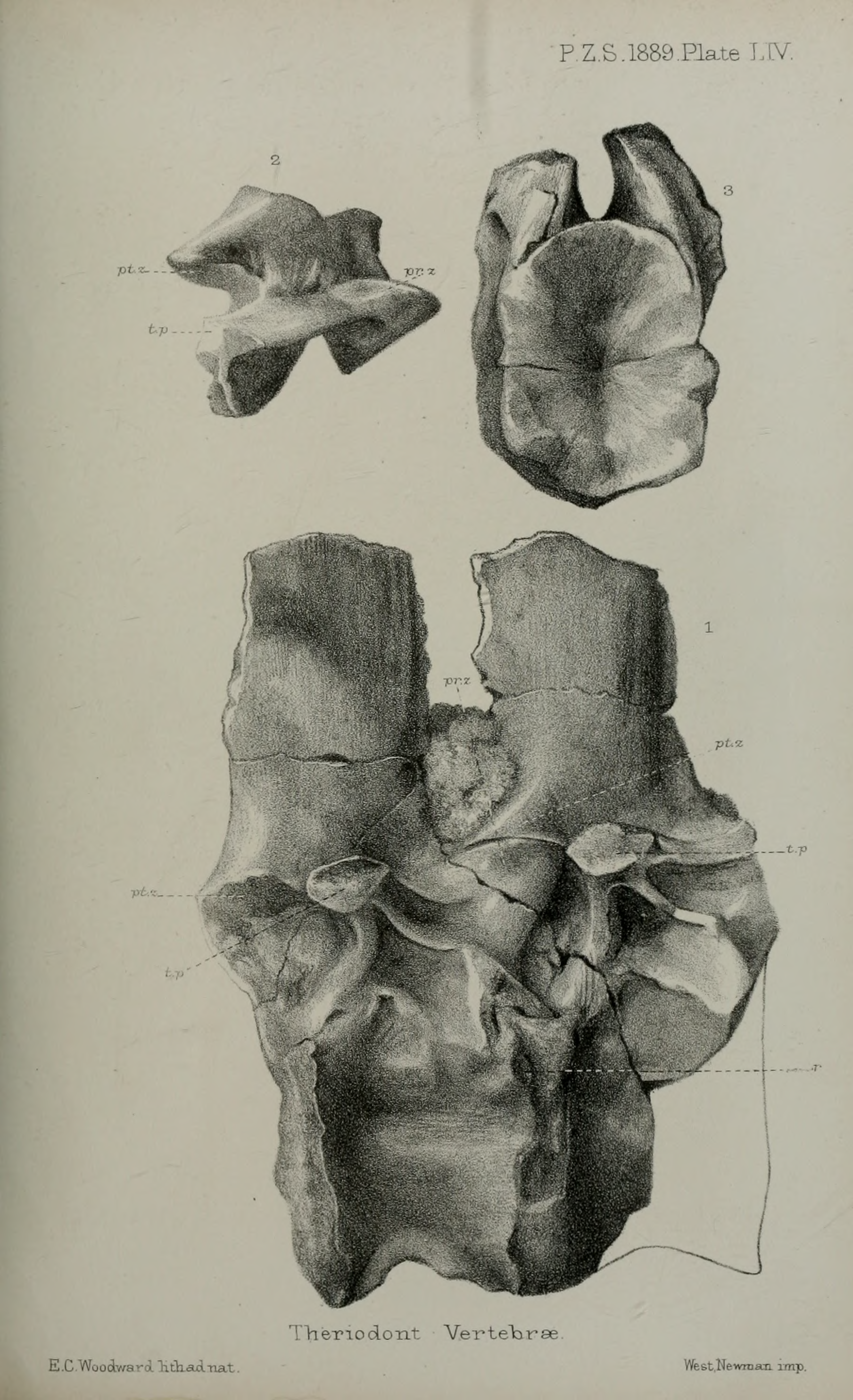
Parts of vertebrae

Early restorations of the skull of Erythrosuchus depicted it as being tall, similar in appearance to the theropod genus Tyrannosaurus. A complete skull that was described in 1963, though, revealed that its true shape was shorter than previously thought. This skull, known as BPI 5207 and currently part of the collection of the Bernard Price Institute for Palaeontological Research in South Africa, has a somewhat pointed snout. Earlier restorations may have shown a deeper snout because how the bones of the skull articulated with one another was unknown then. Supposed Erythrosuchus fossils reported from the Omingonde Formation of Namibia were later described as Etjosuchus, a "rauisuchian" (loricatan) archosaur.

The braincase has also been studied and possesses features that are shared with other early archosauriforms. Many of these characteristics are considered plesiomorphic, or ancestral, in archosaurs. While Erythrosuchus is not considered an archosaur, it is thought to be closely related to the last common ancestor of all archosaurs.

== Classification ==
The hypothetical last common ancestor of archosaurs is thought to have shared many features with Erythrosuchus, many of which are found in the braincase. For example, the inner part of the otic capsule (the skeletal structure surrounding the inner ear) is not entirely ossified or completely formed of bone. Neither is the channel for the perilymphatic duct, which is a tube that leaves the lagena. The lagena is the portion of the inner ear responsible for hearing, and is known as the cochlea in mammals (although in mammals it is coiled rather than straight). Erythrosuchus has a short lagena, which is also expected in the last common ancestor of all archosaurs.

Some features of the ankle of Erythrosuchus suggest that it was beginning to adapt toward walking on toes rather than having the entire foot placed on the ground. The ankle is similar to that of Euparkeria; the ankles of both of these animals are more advanced than those of other archosauriformes.
