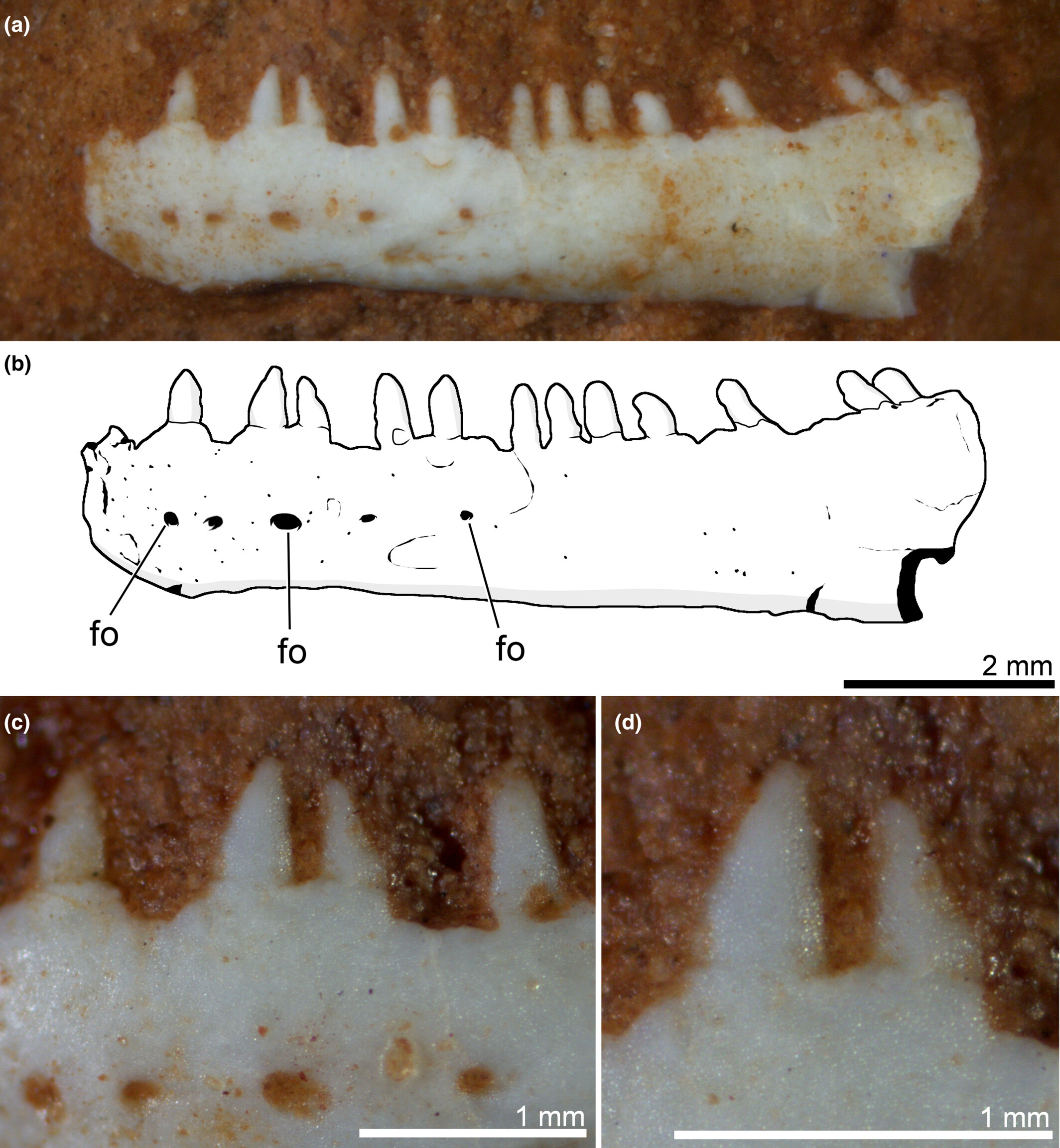
- Dentary referred to C. enigmatica

Scientific classification
- Kingdom: Animalia
- Phylum: Chordata
- Class: Reptilia
- Clade: Lepidosauromorpha
- Genus: †Cargninia; Bonaparte et al. 2010

Type species
- †Cargninia enigmatica Bonaparte et al. 2010

= Cargninia =

Cargninia Temporal range: Late Triassic (Norian), ~225.4 Ma

Extinct genus of reptiles

Cargninia is an extinct genus of basal lepidosauromorph from the Late Triassic of Brazil. The type and only known species is Cargninia enigmatica. It is known from the holotype (UFRGS PV 1027 T) and a referred specimen (CAPPA/UFSM 0519), both of which are partial left dentaries (lower jaw bone) found in Faxinal do Soturno, Rio Grande do Sul, southern Brazil, in the geopark Paleorrota. This locality is from the middle section of the Norian-age Caturrita Formation. Cargninia was named by José Fernando Bonaparte and colleagues in 2010. The generic name honors Daniel Cargnin, a Brazilian priest and fossil collector, and the specific name means "enigmatic", in reference to its uncertain phylogenetic placement.

The preserved dentary has small, peg-like teeth, with the underlying jaw bone about four times deeper than the height of each tooth crown. The holotype jaw was originally collected with eleven preserved teeth and two or three more spaces for broken teeth. However, during preparation, the front half of the fossil was destroyed, leaving only the rear part of the jaw with five preserved teeth and one or two empty spaces. Up to 20 teeth may have been present in a complete lower jaw. The teeth are positioned apicolingually (slightly inwards of the upper edge of the jaw bone). The penultimate tooth in the back of the jaw has a higher attachment point and its base is cemented to the jaw bone. The jaw as a whole can be characterized as having pleuroacrodont tooth implantation.

Cargninia was originally described as a lepidosaur (crown-group lepidosauromorph), possibly related to the gliding kuehneosaurids. A 2020 redescription later considered it a valid, albeit fragmentary, lepidosauromorph with uncertain relations to other members of the group. Its pleuroacrodont dentition is similar to Gephyrosaurus (a basal rhynchocephalian) and Gueragama (a basal acrodontan squamate), which are each early members of major lepidosaur lineages with acrodont dentition. In the absence of more data, Cargninia's condition is considered to be a case of homoplasy (convergent evolution). Several additional pleuroacrodont jaw fragments are known from Faxinal do Soturno, though a lack of overlap prevents an unambiguous referral to Cargninia.

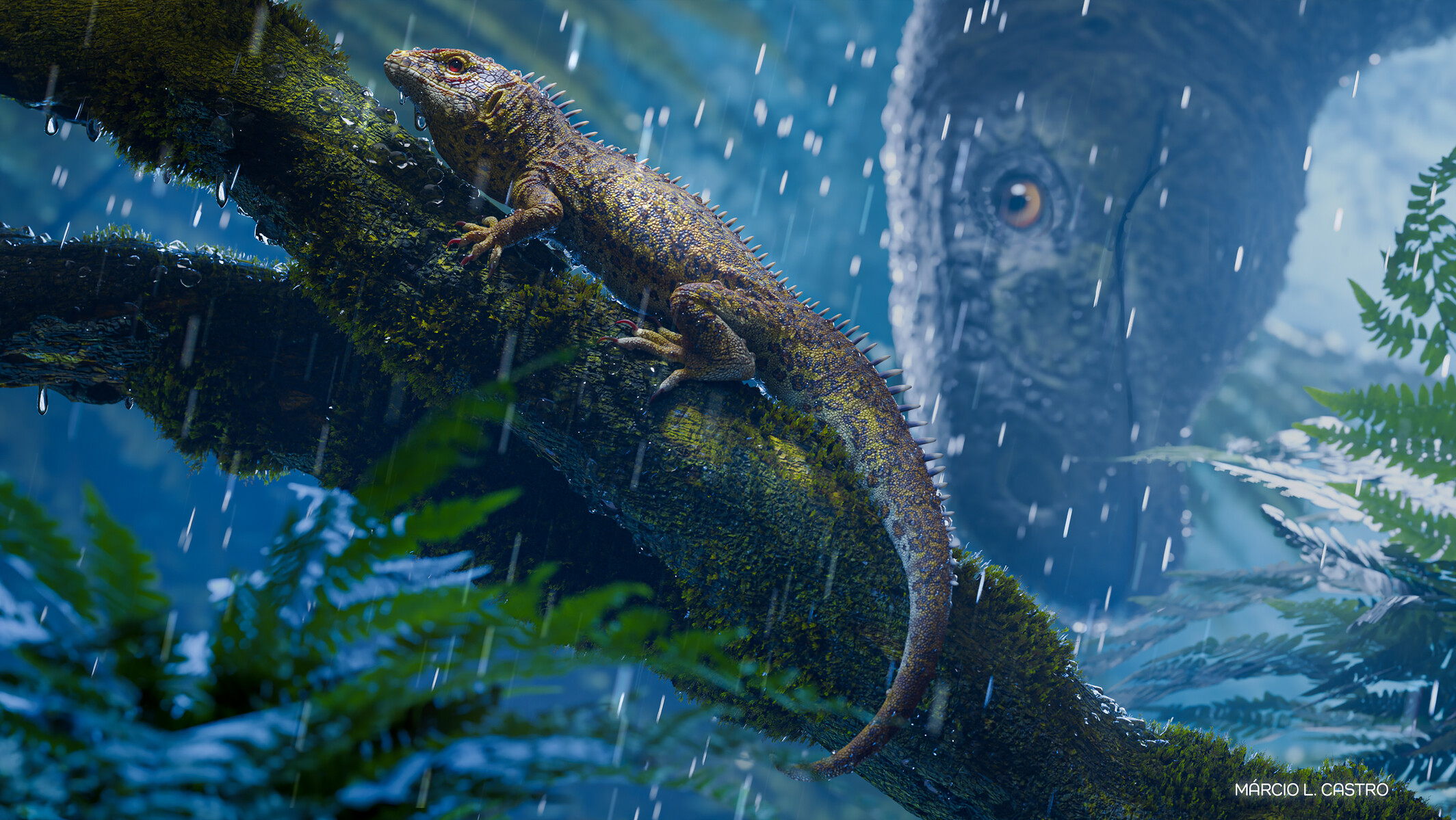
Late Triassic paleoenvironmental reconstruction of Cargninia with the sauropodomorph dinosaur Macrocollum in the background

In 2026, Damke and colleagues described a second specimen of Cargninia from the type locality, which preserves the anterior portion of the dentary that was lost in the holotype. These researchers reassessed the anatomy and relationships of Carginia, and included it in a phylogenetic analysis for the first time. Their strict consensus tree (k = 7–9) recovered it in a clade of non-lepidosaur (stem group) lepidosauromorphs, as the sister taxon to the German Vellbergia. Kuehneosauridae was placed as the earliest-diverging branch of lepidosauromorphs, with Fraxinisaura as its basalmost member. Their tree using k = 10–13 recovered similar results, albeit with keuhneosaurids as non-lepidosaurmorphs and Fraxinisaura as part of the stem-lepidosaur clade. These results are displayed in the cladogram below:

- Lepidosauromorpha
  - - - †Fraxinisaura rozynekae
      - - †Megachirella wachtleri
        - †Marmoretta oxoniensis
    - - †Paliguana whitei
      - - †Vellbergia bartholomaei
        - †Carginia enigmatica
  - Lepidosauria
    - Rhynchocephalia
    - Squamata
