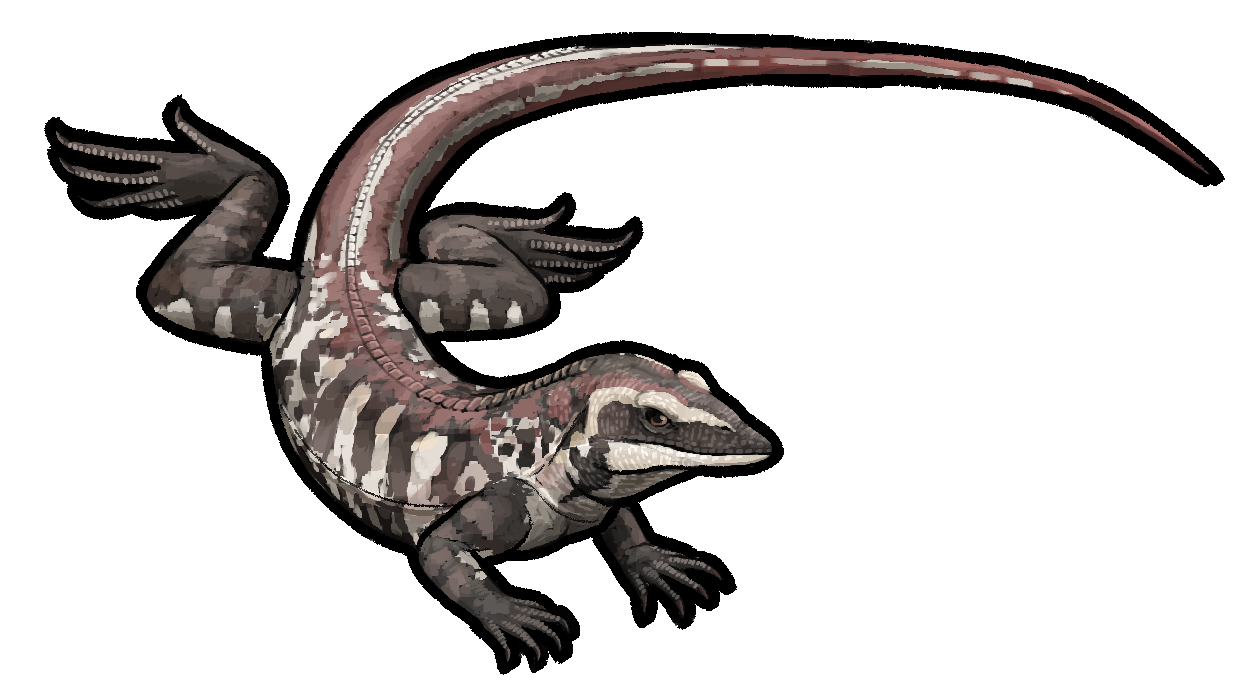
- Life restoration of Huehuecuetzpalli mixtecus

Scientific classification
- Kingdom: Animalia
- Phylum: Chordata
- Class: Reptilia
- Order: Squamata
- Genus: †Huehuecuetzpalli; Reynoso, 1998

Type species
- †Huehuecuetzpalli mixtecus Reynoso 1998

= Huehuecuetzpalli =

Huehuecuetzpalli Temporal range: Late Albian, 105 Ma

Extinct genus of lizards

Huehuecuetzpalli (translating to "the ancient lizard" in Nahuatl) is an extinct genus of lizard from the Early Cretaceous (late Albian) Tlayúa Formation, a Lagerstätte near Tepexi de Rodríguez, Central Mexico. One species, H. mixtecus, is known. Although it is not the oldest known lizard, Huehuecuetzpalli may be amongst the most basal members of Squamata (the group that includes lizards and snakes), and has been variously considered a close relative of Bavarisaurus, Bellairsia, Marmoretta and Oculudentavis, or as the most basal iguanomorphan. Its basal position makes it an important taxon in understanding the origins of squamates.

Huehuecuetzpalli had peg-like teeth of even size, suggesting that it hunted small prey like insects. Its limb proportions are similar to those of modern lizards that practise bipedal locomotion, with hind limbs far smaller than the forelimbs. This suggests that it may, at least on occasion, have walked bipedally.

== Taxonomy ==
=== Discovery and formal description ===
The holotype (IGM 7389) and paratype (IGM 4185) of Huehuecuetzpalli, respectively an adult and a juvenile, were recovered from the Tlayúa Quarry, near Tepexi de Rodríguez in Central Mexico. The specific localities in which they were discovered, represent the Middle Member of the Tlayúa Formation, a Lagerstätte rich in vertebrate fossils. The depositional environment of the Middle Member was a shallow lagoon fringed by a peneplain. On collection, the specimens were transported to the Geological Institute of the National Autonomous University of Mexico. In 1998, Víctor-Hugo Reynoso formally described the genus. The generic name comes from the Nahuatl words huehuetl ("the ancient") and cuetzpalli ("lizard"), while the specific name refers to the La Mixteca region.

=== Classification ===
Describing Huehuecuetzpalli in 1998, Reynoso ran a phylogenetic analysis, wherein the most parsimonious tree recovered it as the outgroup of crown-group squamates. This conclusion was supported by the facts that its premaxillae were still divided, that its vertebrae were still amphicoelous (concave on both ends), similar to those of certain geckos, and that it retained a second distal tarsal, among other characters suggestive of a fairly basal position. However, the shape of the postfrontal and the presence of a parietal foramen suggested an affinity with Iguanomorpha (then called Iguania), and Reynoso noted that the traits indicative of a more basal position may be the result of neoteny (the retention of juvenile traits into adulthood). The tree recovered by Reynoso is below:

- Squamata (total group)
  - Huehuecuetzpalli
  - Squamata (crown group)
    - Iguania
      - - Agamidae
        - Chamaeleontidae
      - Iguanidae
    - Scleroglossa
      - Scincomorpha
        - - Cordylidae
          - Scincidae
        - - - - Gymnophthalmidae
              - Teiidae
            - Lacertidae
          - Xantusiidae
      - - - - Amphisbaenia
            - Dibamidae
          - Gekkota
            - Gekkonidae
            - Pygopodidae
        - - Serpentes
          - Anguimorpha
            - - Anguidae
              - Xenosauridae
            - - Helodermatidae
              - - Lanthanotus
                - Varanus

A fairly basal position has been supported by subsequent papers. Tiago R. Simões et al., in 2018, recovered Huehuecuetzpalli as the sister taxon of Marmoretta, a basal lepidosauromorph from Europe. Arnau Bolet et al., in 2022, recovered it as sister to Bavarisaurus from Germany. Talanda et al., also in 2022, recovered it in a clade with Bellairsia and Oculudentavis, at the stem of Squamata. A cladogram based on the results of Talanda et al. is reproduced below:

- - Archosauromorpha
  - Lepidosauromorpha
    - - †Paliguana
      - †Megachirella
      - - †Fraxinisaura
        - †Marmoretta
    - crown-Lepidosauria
      - †Sophineta
      - Rhynchocephalia
      - - - †Bellairsia
          - - †Oculudentavis
            - †Huehuecuetzpalli
        - crown-Squamata

== Description ==
As an adult, Huehuecuetzpalli had a skull length of 3.22 cm (1.27 in), and its presacral vertebral column (a total of 24 vertebrae, consisting of the cervical and dorsal vertebrae, prior to the sacrum) was 7.55 cm (2.97 in) in length.

=== Skull ===
Huehuecuetzpalli had paired premaxillae, contributing to an elongated snout, and retracted external nares, convergent with those of varanids. The overall jaw structure of Huehuecuetzpalli resembles that of varanids, possibly suggesting similar feeding behaviours. However, the ziphodont (laterally compressed and serrated) teeth of varanids are absent: those of Huehuecuetzpalli were instead peg-like, suggesting that it may instead have fed on smaller prey, such as insects.

=== Postcranial elements ===
Huehuecuetzpalli bore a row of small osteoderms over the middle dorsal vertebrae. It had 24 presacral vertebrae. The paratype juvenile preserves 32 of the original caudal vertebrae, as well as a cartilaginous regenerated segment at the tip. The hind limbs of Huehuecuetzpalli were considerably longer than the forelimbs, falling within range of limb ratios observed in modern lizards that occasionally exhibit bipedalism. Thus, Huehuecuetzpalli may itself have habitually practised bipedal locomotion.

== Palaeoenvironment ==
The palaeoenvironment of the Tlayúa Formation, from which both specimens of Huehuecuetzpalli are known, was likely a shallow coastal lagoon. It may have formed part of an island, though a connection to the North American mainland cannot be ruled out. A certain degree of influence from freshwater environments is indicated by the presence of fossils from crocodilians and freshwater turtles.
