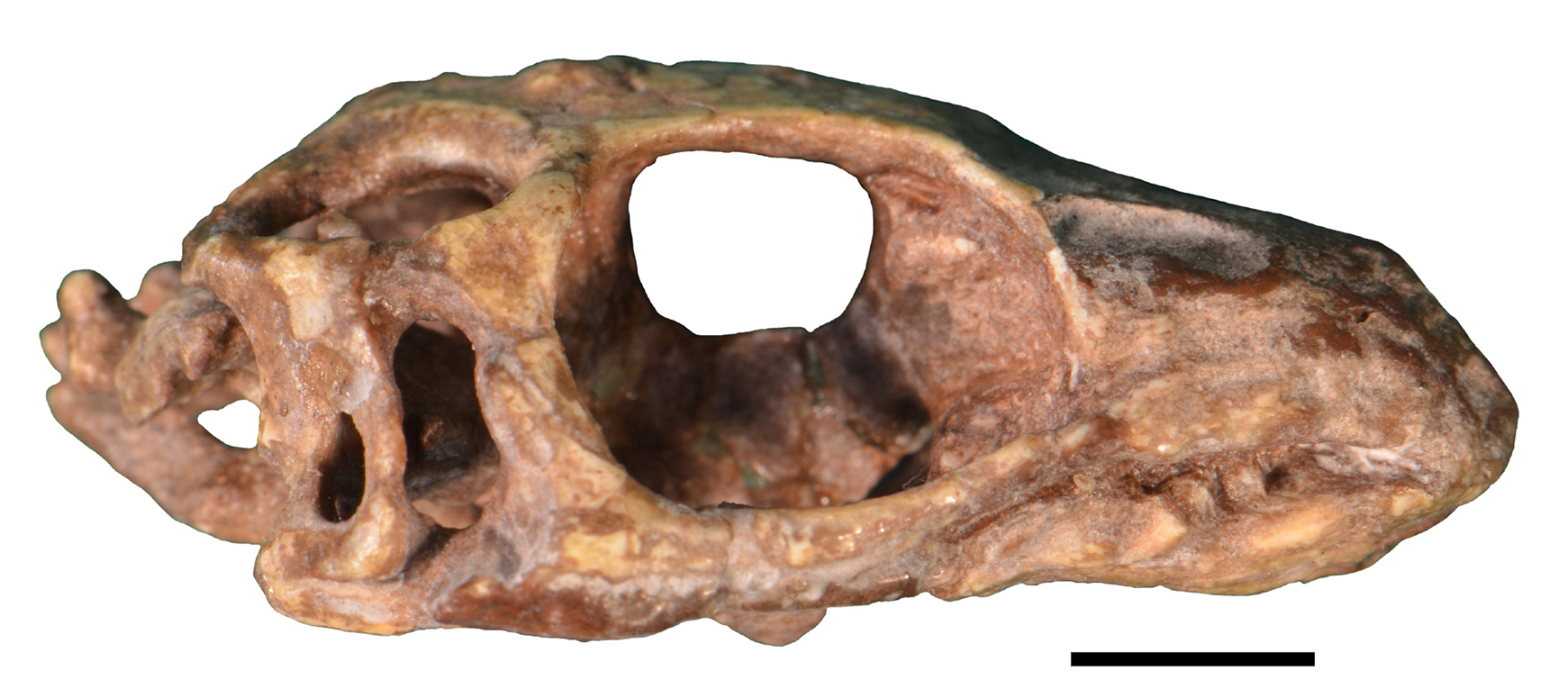
- Skull of Paliguana
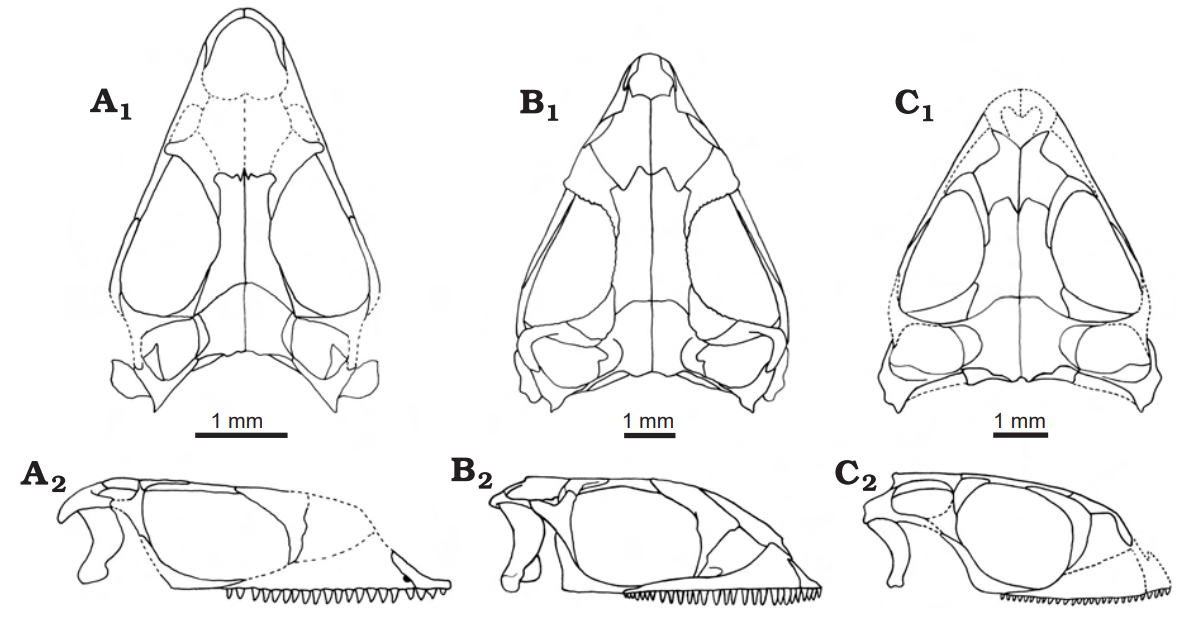
- Skulls of three kuehneosaurids

Scientific classification
- Kingdom: Animalia
- Phylum: Chordata
- Class: Reptilia
- Clade: Lepidosauromorpha
- Order: †Eolacertilia; Robinson, 1967

Families
- †Paliguana; †Kuehneosauridae

= Eolacertilia =

Eolacertilia Temporal range: Triassic

Extinct clade of reptiles

Eolacertilia ("dawn lizards") is a proposed clade of extinct lepidosauromorph reptiles known from fossils dating to the Triassic period. Whether they are a natural group is uncertain, and some suggest they form a "wastebasket" taxon. Suggested members of the group are Paliguana and Kuehneosauridae, as other genera have been transferred to basal groups within Diapsida (such as Palaeagama and Saurosternon), Archosauromorpha (Tanystropheus), or elsewhere (Cteniogenys).
