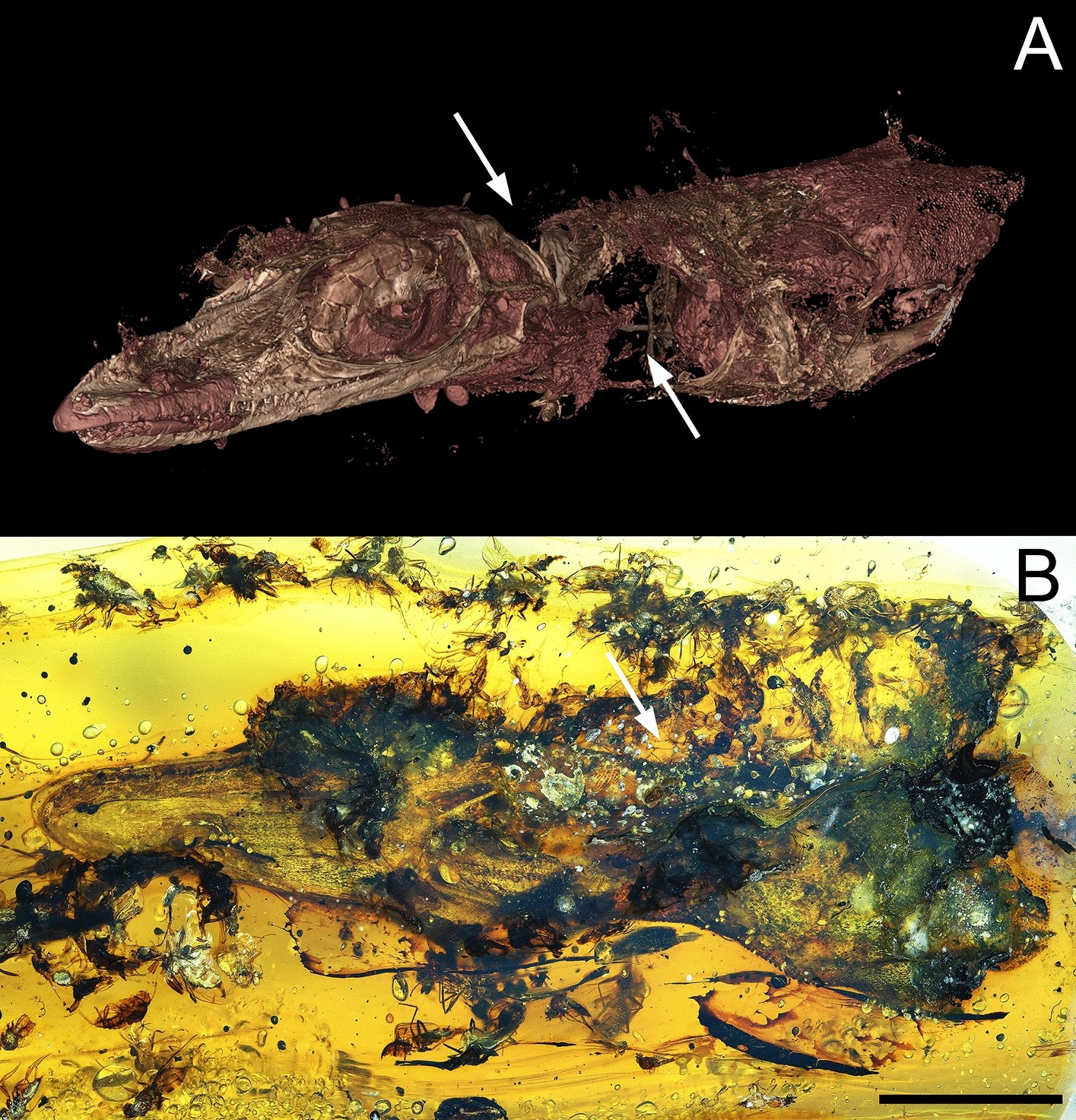
- Holotype of O. naga 3D scan (top) and in ventral view (bottom) with arrows pointing to consumed flesh (top) and fly inclusions (bottom)

Scientific classification
- Kingdom: Animalia
- Phylum: Chordata
- Class: Reptilia
- Order: Squamata
- Genus: †Oculudentavis; Xing et al., 2020

Type species
- †Oculudentavis khaungraae Xing et al., 2020

Other species
- †Oculudentavis naga Bolet et al., 2021

= Oculudentavis =

Oculudentavis Temporal range: Cenomanian, 99.41–98.17 Ma

Extinct genus of reptiles

Oculudentavis is an extinct genus of lizard of uncertain taxonomic placement, originally but inaccurately identified as an avialan dinosaur (bird, in the broad sense). It contains two known species, O. khaungraae and O. naga. Each species is known from one partial fossil specimen in Burmese amber, which differ in several proportions. Their skulls measure 1.4–1.7 centimetres (0.55–0.67 in) in length, indicating that Oculudentavis would have been comparable in size with the modern bee hummingbird if it were an avialan. Both specimens were retrieved from 99-million-year-old deposits of the Hukawng Basin in Kachin State, northern Myanmar. The type specimen of O. khaungraae is embroiled in controversy regarding its identity and the ethical issues surrounding the acquisition and study of Burmese amber. The original description advocating for an avialan identity was published in Nature, but has since been retracted from the journal.

== Discovery and naming ==
Oculudentavis khaungraae is known from a complete skull preserved in Burmese amber, found at the Angbamo site in Tanai Township, Kachin State, northern Myanmar. The genus name Oculudentavis was chosen to include the combination of the words oculus, dentes, and avis. These Latin words translate to "eye", "teeth", and "bird" respectively. The specific name honors Khaung Ra, the woman who donated the piece of amber to the Hupoge Amber Museum for study. Presently, the holotype is cataloged as HPG-15-3 in the Hupoge Amber Museum.

Later that year, an unpublished preprint attributed a second specimen (GRS-Ref-286278) to the genus. Subsequently, in 2021, it was published in the journal Current Biology. This specimen, which consists of the skull and the front portion of the torso, was found in the same mine as the holotype of O. khaungraae. It was named as a different species, O. naga, after the local Naga people of Myanmar (who historically played a prominent role in the amber trade).

== Description ==
Size of both specimens compared with human hand, bee hummingbird and Brookesia micra

The holotype skull of O. khaungraae was 1.73 centimetres (0.68 in) in length, while the holotype skull of O. naga was 1.42 centimetres (0.56 in) in length; the length of the former was initially misreported as 1.4 centimetres (0.55 in). The animal would have been comparable in size with the modern bee hummingbird, the smallest known living dinosaur.

It had a slender snout and a bulbous skull roof, as well as a long tooth row of twenty-three teeth. The orbits were very large and had a thick scleral ring formed from unusual spoon-shaped scleral ossicles. This indicates that it was likely a diurnal animal, active mostly during the day. The eyes bulge sideways according to an outwardly slanted jugal (cheekbone), indicating that it did not possess binocular vision. It may have had a relatively strong bite and a specialized diet of small invertebrates, based on its sharp teeth, extensively textured mouth skin, tall coronoid process, and robust, inflexible skull.

Oculudentavis had a collection of plesiomorphic ("primitive") and advanced traits compared with Mesozoic avialans. For example, it retains separate frontal, parietal, postorbital, and squamosal bones, which are fused together or lost in modern birds. The extensive tooth row is also similar to non-avialan theropods. On the other hand, it lacks a separate antorbital fenestra and the bones of the snout are elongated and fused. These features are more common among modern birds. Some traits, such as the acrodont or pleurodont tooth implantation and spoon-shaped scleral bones are unprecedented for dinosaurs as a whole, and instead, are common among modern lizards. A patch of seemingly scaly skin occurs near the base of the skull, unusual for a bird, but consistent with a lepidosaur identity. The high tooth count and apparent lack of an antorbital fenestra or quadratojugal bone have also been used to argue against an avialan identity. The two specimens are distinguished by numerous characters of the skull, though the authors of the description of O. naga noted that it was "possible that at least some of these differences between the two specimens are due to a combination of individual variation, taphonomical deformation, and perhaps sexual dimorphism".

== Classification ==
Specializations caused by the small size of Oculudentavis led to difficulties in making precise conclusions on its classification. A phylogenetic analysis in the original description supports a basal placement for Oculudentavis within Avialae, only slightly closer to modern birds than Archaeopteryx. This suggests that a ~50 million year ghost lineage exists between the Late Jurassic and the middle of the Cretaceous. A small amount of most parsimonious trees instead suggest that it is an enantiornithean, like other birds preserved in Burmese amber. The cladogram following the original description is shown below:

- - †Dromaeosauridae
  - Aves
    - †Archaeopteryx
    - - †Oculudentavis
      - - †Jeholornis
        - Pygostylia
          - †Confuciusornithiformes
          - - †Sapeornis
            - Ornithothoraces
              - †Enantiornithes
              - - Ornithuromorpha

Soon after the publication of the article, a number of paleontologists voiced skepticism on whether Oculudentavis is even a dinosaur, due to a much higher number of similarities with squamates than with theropods. The general skull shape is considered the largest argument in favor of bird affinities, but some living lizards (Meroles, Anolis) and extinct reptiles (Avicranium, Teraterpeton) are known to have convergently evolved a bird-like skull shape. The usage of a bird-focused phylogenetic analysis (without considering lizards) also has been criticized. The editors of the Institute of Vertebrate Paleontology and Paleoanthropology's Fanpu publication have published an editorial arguing for an interpretation of Oculudentavis as a lizard rather than an avialan.

Several additional phylogenetic analyses were conducted for the description of O. naga, including both of the specimens referred to the genus. Both specimens were consistently placed together in the genus Oculudentavis. An analysis based on a dataset of amniotes found that they were squamates. Within the squamates, analyses with a more detailed dataset variously recovered Oculudentavis as the sister group of (1) the Dibamidae, (2) Scandensia, and (3) Mosasauria, depending on whether multi-state characteristics were treated as (1) ordered or (2) unordered or if (3) molecular data was removed. A 2022 description of the Middle Jurassic lizard Bellairsia by Tałanda et al. found Oculudentavis to be a stem-group squamate, forming a weakly supported clade with Huehuecuetzpalli from the mid-Cretaceous of Mexico and Bellairsia. The cladogram below displays the results of the phylogenetic analyses by Tałanda et al.:

- Squamata
  - - †Bellairsia
    - - †Oculudentavis
      - †Huehuecuetzpalli
  - crown-Squamata
    - †Hongshanxi
    - †Ardeosaurus
    - - other Squamata
    - - - †Eichstaettisaurus
        - - Dibamus
          - - †Gobekko
            - - Dactylocnemis
              - - Coleonyx
                - Gekko

== Paleoecology ==
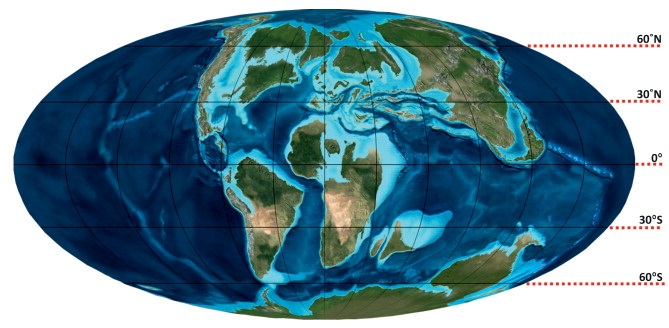
Paleogeography of the late Turonian (90 Ma) Original map by Ron Blakey

Burmese amber is retrieved from the Hukawng Valley, the geographical representation of the Hukawng Basin, a large Mesozoic-Cenozoic sedimentary basin in Kachin State of northern Myanmar. The strata have undergone folding and faulting. The basin is considered to be a part of the West Burma block or Burma terrane, which has a debated tectonic history. The block was part of Gondwana during at least the Early Paleozoic, but the timing of rifting is very uncertain, with estimates ranging from the Devonian to Early Cretaceous. It also is disputed whether the block had accreted onto the Asian continental margin by the time of the amber deposition.

Some members of the flora and fauna have Gondwanan affinities although albanerpetontids are more typically found in the northern continents. A recent paleomagnetic reconstruction finds that the Burma terrane formed an island land mass in the Tethys Ocean during the Mid Creaceous at a latitude around 5-10 degrees south of the equator.

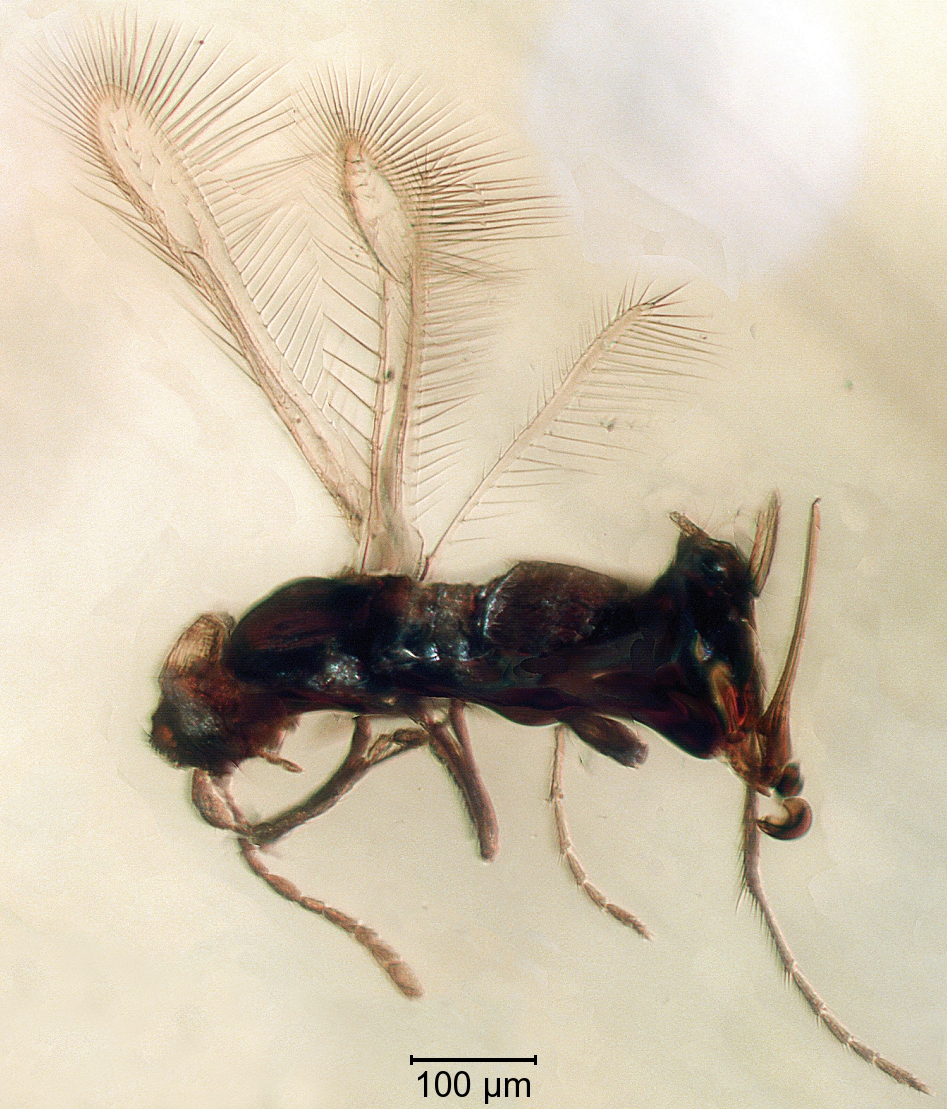
Myanmymar aresconoides

The amber deposits have provided a wealth of fossil flora (including mosses and bamboo-like monocots), arthropods (among many others pisaurid spiders, onychophorans, dyspnoid harvestmen, and coccoid scale insects), and a number of vertebrates (including well-preserved three-dimensional anatomy of skeletons and feathers), that the paleoecology of the earliest Cenomanian environment has been interpreted in detail. The existence of the frog Electrorana limoae (the oldest record of frogs in amber), the snake Xiaophis myanmarensi, lizard Cretaceogekko burmae, an albanerpetontid and several enantiornitheans including Elektorornis and undescribed specimens, suggest a humid, warm, tropical forest ecosystem that contained at least some freshwater habitats. The presence of ammonites and marine ostracods suggest that some of the amber-bearing forests existed near the shore of a marine environment.

Zircons in the tuffs of the formation in which the Burmese amber has been found have been U-Pb dated to 98.8 ± 0.6 Ma, or the Cenomanian epoch of the earliest Late Cretaceous.

== Controversy ==
=== Ethics of Burmese amber ===
Upon the high-profile release of the paper, which was featured on the front cover of Nature, several palaeontologists renewed discussion around controversies related to Burmese amber, which were first raised in 2019. These include poor working conditions for miners (many of whom are underage), and allegations that the high-end trade of Burmese amber helps to fund the Kachin conflict, akin to blood diamonds. As of April 2020, the Society of Vertebrate Paleontology has discouraged its members from collecting and studying Burmese amber due to the connections between the resource and human rights abuse.

=== Scientific criticism ===
In response to the paper's taxonomic identification of Oculudentavis, critics such as Wang et al. also have noted a deliberate use of ambiguous language by the authors — in particular, the statement that Oculudentavis is "bird-like" as opposed to being a bird, and the admission that "there is a strong potential for new data to markedly alter [their] systematic conclusion". The decision of the authors to assume that Oculudentavis is a bird a priori, without testing other possible positions, for their morphological description and phylogenetic analysis also was called "illogical" by Wang et al., who noted that the rejection of this hypothesis would compromise the paper's conclusions and significance. On July 22, 2020, the original Nature article describing the genus was retracted. This retraction was motivated by the type specimen of O. naga, which opposes the paper's hypothesis that the original specimen is an avialan.

== See also ==
- Vertebrates in Burmese amber
