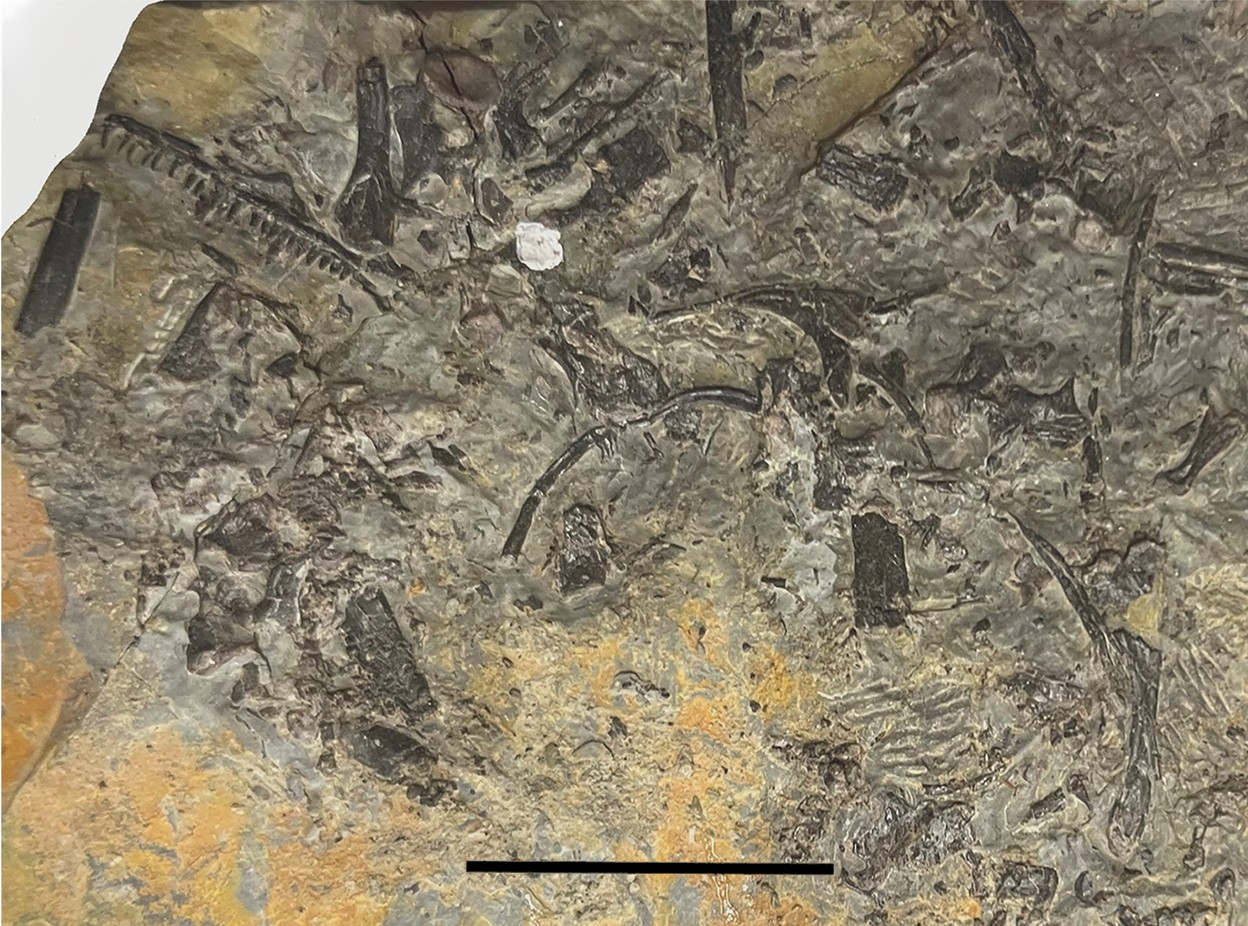
- Holotype specimen

Scientific classification
- Kingdom: Animalia
- Phylum: Chordata
- Class: Reptilia
- Clade: Lepidosauromorpha
- Genus: †Fraxinisaura; Schoch & Sues, 2018

Type species
- †Fraxinisaura rozynekae Schoch & Sues, 2018

= Fraxinisaura =

Fraxinisaura Temporal range: Middle Triassic, Ladinian

Extinct genus of reptiles

Fraxinisaura is an extinct genus of basal lepidosauromorph reptile known from the Middle Triassic of Germany. The only known species is Fraxinisaura rozynekae. It possessed an elongated snout, unique features of the teeth, and an ilium (upper hip bone) which was intermediate in orientation between sphenodontians (the branch of lepidosaurs including the tuatara) and squamates (the branch including lizards). Based on characteristics of the maxilla, it is considered a close relative of Marmoretta from the Middle Jurassic of the United Kingdom, resolving a ghost lineage between that genus and other Triassic basal lepidosauromorphs.

== Discovery ==
Remains of Fraxinisaura have only been recovered from the Schumann limestone quarry near Vellberg, Germany. Stratigraphically, it hails from the Untere Graue Mergel Layer of the Erfurt Formation, also known as the Lower Keuper. The Lower Keuper preserved a lakeshore environment of Ladinian (late Middle Triassic) age. The holotype of Fraxinisaura is SMNS 91547, a disarticulated partial skeleton encompassing portions of the skull, vertebrae, hip and limbs. Numerous other isolated bones have also been referred to the taxon. Fraxinisaura combines the Latin words for lizard (saurus) and ash tree (fraxinus). This references the nearby village of Eschenau, which means "meadow of ash trees". The species name honors Brigette Rozynek, a fossil collector who donated many Lower Keuper fossils to local museums. Fraxinisaura was described by Rainer R. Schoch and Hans-Dieter Sues in 2018.

== Description ==
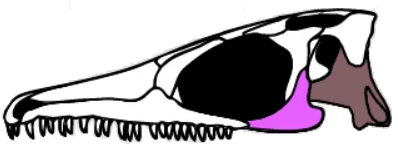
Diagram of the skull, the jugal is coloured in lilac, while the quadrate and quadratojugal are shown in brown

The skull of adults was probably 2-2.5 centimeters (.8-1 inches) in length, with a low and elongated snout. Some bones are faintly textured similar to those of kuehneosaurids. The maxilla has a short facial process (upwards branch) and a uniquely long premaxillary process (front branch), conditions also known to a lesser extent in Marmoretta. The 22+ maxillary teeth are characteristic as well, being conical, closely spaced, and bearing longitudinal striations at their tips. The teeth are slightly heterodont, with those at the front of the maxilla having more recurved tips than those at the back of the maxilla, or the four at the premaxilla. The left and right frontal and parietal bones at the top of the skull are more robust, flatter, and unfused to their counterparts in contrast to those of Marmoretta. There may have been a small gap where the frontals and parietals meet. The nasal bones at the top of the snout are also longer (from front-to-back) and thinner (from side-to-side) than those of Marmoretta. As with most early lepidosauromorphs, the posterior process (rear branch) of the jugal was very short, leaving the lower temporal fenestra open from below. Preserved postemporal bones, such as the postorbital and squamosal, were smaller and more conservative in shape than those of other early lepidosauromorphs. The rear of the parasphenoid had a small patch of teeth, a plesiomorphic feature not present in most saurians. There are also three longitudinal rows of small teeth on each pterygoid bone, as well as a transverse row (which is not present in Marmoretta). The ectopterygoid resembles that of Sphenodon (the modern tuatara). The dentary has a small expansion at the tip, forming a "chin" similar to that of sphenodontians. The elongated, closely spaced dentary teeth are similar to those of the maxilla. Dentition is pleurodont, like other basal lepidosauromorphs and lizards, but unlike sphenodontians.

Vertebrae are similar to those of Marmoretta and kuehneosaurs, being amphicoelous (concave at both ends) and lacking a hole for the notochord. The scapula and coracoid are fused into a scapulocoracoid, while the interclavicle was large, arrow-shaped, and heavily textured. Like other lepidosauromorphs, the humerus is twisted, constricted in the middle, and possesses an entepicondylar foramen but not an ectepicondylar one. The ilium has a distinctively long, leaf-shaped iliac blade which projects up and back at a 45 degree angle, intermediate between the horizontal iliac blade of lizards, and the vertical iliac blade of sphenodontians. Sophineta and Gephyrosaurus have a similarly shaped intermediate ilium. Recovered hindlimb material generally resembles that of generalized lepidosaurs like Sphenodon, though the femur is somewhat more robust.

== Classification ==
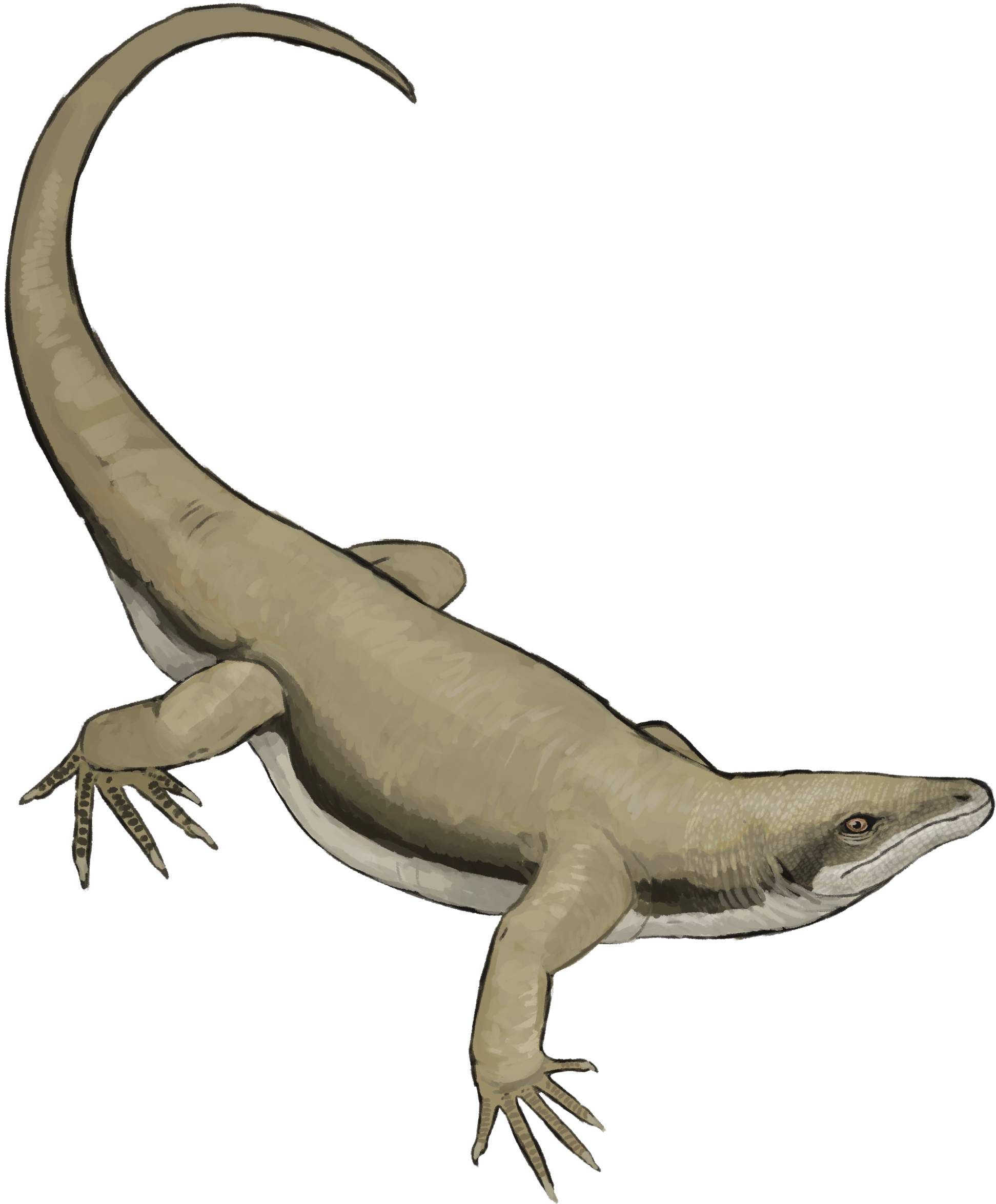
Speculative life restoration

Fraxinisaura does not preserve a quadrate, sternum, or metatarsal V, bones which are useful for determining whether a reptile is a lepidosauromorph or not. However, it does possess an entepicondylar foramen of the humerus as well as pleurodont dentition, both of which are characteristic lepidosauromorph features. The shape of the maxilla also links it to Marmoretta, helping to fill the small ghost lineage which lies between Marmoretta (from the mid to late Jurassic) and other basal lepidosauromorphs (which appeared in the Triassic). This classification scheme was supported by a phylogenetic analysis using the data matrix of Ezcurra et al. (2014). The Fraxinisaura + Marmoretta clade was tentatively considered to be closer to Sophineta and rhynchocephalians than to lizards, but lepidosauromorph relations were largely reduced into a polytomy upon the addition of Kuehneosaurus into the analysis. Adding Fraxinisaura to another lepidosauromorph analysis (Evans and Borsuk-Białynicka (2009)) also led to a large polytomy.

Below is a portion of the cladogram produced by adding Fraxinisaura (but not Kuehneosaurus) to the analysis of Ezcurra et al. (2014):

- Lepidosauromorpha
  - †Paliguana
  - Squamata
    - †Huehuecuetzpalli
    - - †Dalinghosaurus
      - Chalarodon
  - - - †Fraxinisaura
      - †Marmoretta
    - - †Sophineta
      - †Gephyrosaurus
      - †Planocephalosaurus (Sphenodontia)
