= Saurosternon =

Saurosternon Temporal range: Late Permian

Scientific classification
- Kingdom: Animalia
- Phylum: Chordata
- Class: Reptilia
- Clade: Neodiapsida
- Genus: †Saurosternon; Huxley, 1868

Type species
- †Saurosternon bainii Huxley, 1868

Extinct genus of reptiles

Saurosternon is an extinct genus of neodiapsid reptile from the Late Permian of South Africa. It is based on a partial skeleton split between two slabs of sandstone from the Daptocephalus Assemblage Zone. Saurosternon was one of the earliest small lizard-like reptiles to be discovered in Permian deposits of the Karoo Supergroup, preceding later discoveries such as Paliguana, Youngina, Palaeagama, and Lacertulus. The skeleton is mostly complete, though missing the head. Most of the original bone had decayed away by the time the fossil was discovered, leaving perfect molds in the sandstone slabs. What little bone remained was removed with acid by museum preparators, and the specimen was cast with latex to reconstruct the original bone shape.

The affinities of Saurosternon are uncertain. Several studies interpreted it as one of the earliest lepidosauromorphs, the reptile group including squamates (lizards and snakes), rhynchocephalians (tuatara and kin), and their close relatives. One study proposed that Saurosternon was a "paliguanid", a suggested (and likely invalid) ancestral family of lizards also including Paliguana and Palaeagama. More recently it has generally been considered an early neodiapsid outside of Sauria (the crown group of reptiles).
