= Lacertulus =

Lacertulus Temporal range: Upper Permian?

Scientific classification
- Kingdom: Animalia
- Phylum: Chordata
- Class: Reptilia
- Clade: Lepidosauromorpha (?)
- Genus: †Lacertulus; Carroll & Thompson, 1982

Type species
- †Lacertulus bipes Carroll & Thompson, 1982

Extinct genus of reptiles

Lacertulus is an extinct genus of lizard-like reptile, possibly a lepidosauromorph, from the Karoo Supergroup of South Africa. It contains a single species, Lacertulus bipes, which is based on a small articulated skeleton stored in the Transvaal Museum in Pretoria. The origin and locality of the specimen is unknown, though it is embedded in a greenish-gray siltstone similar to some sediments from the Late Permian Daptocephalus Assemblage Zone. The skeleton is mostly complete apart from the distal part of the tail, but erosion and improper preparation has damaged the skull and parts of the torso. Though originally described as a lepidosaur, poor preservation has lent doubt to this conclusion. Lacertulus is notable for its small size (around 5 cm or 2.0 inches in snout-vent length) and proportionally small forelimbs relative to the large and well-ossified hindlimbs. The short humerus in particular suggests that it was capable of some degree of bipedal locomotion when escaping predators, by comparison to modern facultatively bipedal lizards such as Crotaphytus (collared lizards).
