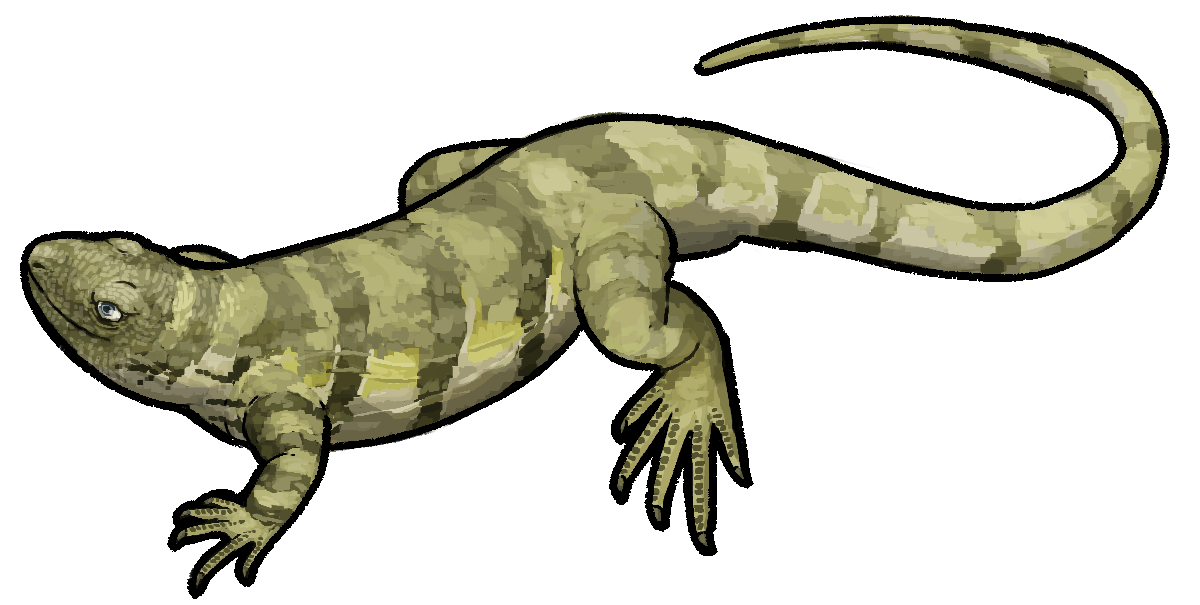
- Life restoration

Scientific classification
- Kingdom: Animalia
- Phylum: Chordata
- Class: Reptilia
- Clade: Neodiapsida
- Genus: †Palaeagama; Broom, 1926

Type species
- †Palaeagama vielhaueri Broom, 1926

= Palaeagama =

Palaeagama Temporal range: Late Permian or Early Triassic

Extinct genus of reptiles

Palaeagama is an extinct genus of neodiapsid reptile from the Late Permian or Early Triassic of South Africa. It is known from much of an articulated skeleton. The exact age of Palaeagama is unclear; it was described in 1926 as having been found in rock layers associated with the Late Permian Cistecephalus Assemblage Zone, while a 1975 revision preferred the Early Triassic Lystrosaurus Assemblage Zone for the specimen's origins, but did not rule out the end-Permian Daptocephalus Assemblage Zone. Despite the completeness of the specimen, Palaeagama is considered as a "wildcard" taxon of uncertain affinities due to poor preservation. It was originally considered an "eosuchian" (ancestral to modern reptiles), and later reinterpreted as a lizard ancestor closely related to Paliguana and Saurosternon. Modern studies generally consider it an indeterminate neodiapsid, though a few phylogenetic analyses tentatively support a position at the base of Lepidosauromorpha.
