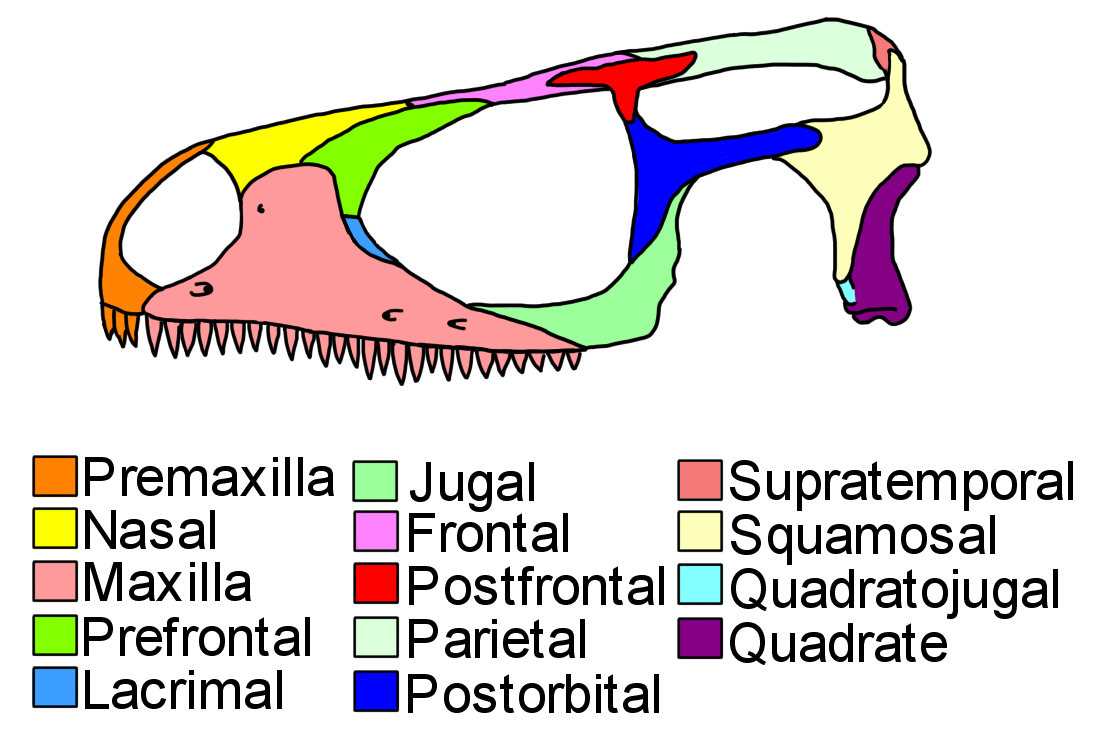
- Cranial diagram

Scientific classification
- Domain: Eukaryota
- Kingdom: Animalia
- Phylum: Chordata
- Class: Reptilia
- Clade: Lepidosauromorpha
- Genus: †Sophineta; Evans & Borsuk−Białynicka, 2009

Type species
- †Sophineta cracoviensis Evans & Borsuk−Białynicka, 2009

= Sophineta =

Sophineta Temporal range: Early Triassic, 247.3 Ma

Extinct genus of reptiles

Sophineta is an extinct genus of basal lepidosauromorph reptile known from the Early Triassic (late Olenekian age) of Małopolska Province, southern Poland. It contains a single species, Sophineta cracoviensis.

== Discovery ==
Sophineta was first described and named by Susan E. Evans and Magdalena Borsuk−Białynicka in 2009, and the type species is Sophineta cracoviensis. It is known from holotype ZPAL RV/175, a nearly complete right maxilla. Many isolated or associated skull and postcranial fragments are referred to the species, representing frontals, parietals, prefrontal, postfrontals, postorbitals, jugals, squamosals, pterygoids, quadrates, maxillae, premaxilla, dentaries, vertebrae and ilia.

Sophineta fossils were discovered in situ and collected in 1982 by a team (Paszkowski and Wieczorek) from the Institute of Geological Sciences of Jagiellonian University in Kraków. They were collected from the Czatkowice 1 locality, a single exposure near Kraków from which a diverse fauna of small vertebrates is known. It represents Triassic karst deposits which developed in Early Carboniferous (Tournaisian to Mid Visean) limestone which is now mined at the Czatkowice quarry. The locality dates to the earliest Late Olenekian stage of the Early Triassic period, about 247.3 million years ago. Sophineta is the smaller of the two lepidosauromorph reptiles known from the Czatkowice quarry, alongside the larger kuehneosaurid Pamelina. Czatkowice 1 material was transferred to and stored at the Museum of the Earth and Institute of Paleobiology of the Polish Academy of Sciences in Warsaw. Preliminary chemical preparation in acetic acid was initially performed, before effective preparation started in the 1990s until 2007.

=== Etymology ===
The generic name honors Professor Zofia Kielan-Jaworowska of the Instytut Paleobiologii PAN, and it is derived from Greek sophia, meaning "wisdom" which is the classical root of the name Zofia. The specific name is derived from Cracovia, the Latin name for Kraków, the closest major Polish city to the Czatkowice 1 locality (the type locality of Sophineta). It is also honors researchers at the University of Kraków for their work at the locality.

== Description ==
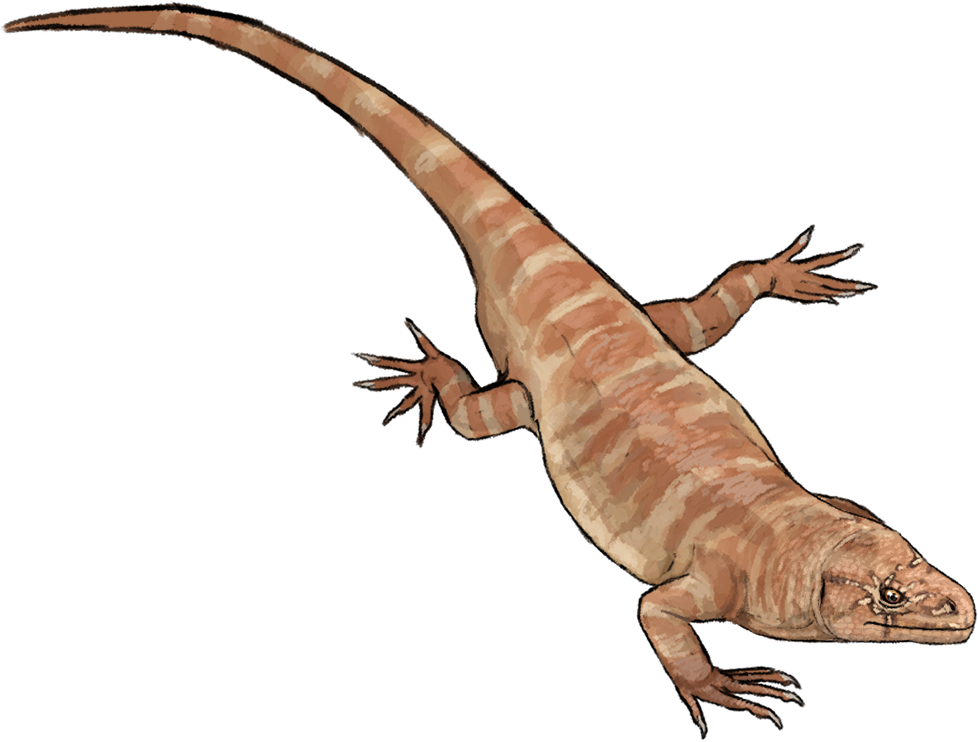
Life restoration

Sophineta differs from all kuehneosaurs and Marmoretta in having short vertebrae bearing notochord pits while lacking transverse processes. It also has pleurodont teeth, rather than subthecodont teeth like in all kuehneosaurs. Other differences are the presence of paired rather than confluent nares, the presence of weakly developed zygosphenoidal articulations on the vertebrae, and compressed keeled tooth tips rather than simple cones. It differs from the Paliguana in having a deeper facial process on the maxilla and a much smaller lacrimal, and from Marmoretta in that the latter has a specialised maxillary/premaxillary overlap. Sophineta resembles lepidosaurs in having weak zygosphenes, short vertebrae and single−headed ribs throughout the column, but differs in having a shallower pleurodont tooth implantation and the apparent absence of both a thyroid fenestra and functional caudal autotomy. Sophineta had an unspecialised vertebral column but fairly derived skull structure, including the tall facial process of the maxilla, reduced lacrimal and pleurodonty. These traits also resemble those of early lepidosaurs more than stem−lepidosaurs. The skull of Sophineta reconstructed as a "modified diapsid skull" with a relatively short preorbital region. The orbits, narial openings and upper temporal fenestrae are large, and the lower temporal fenestrae are open ventrally. Based on the dimensions of the ZPAL RV/175 and skull proportions in Marmoretta, its total skull length is estimated to be about 10 mm (0.39 in), with a body length (excluding the tail) of about 30 mm (1.2 in).

== Classification ==
Susan E. Evans and Magdalena Borsuk−Białynicka (2009) performed a phylogenetic analysis that recovered Sophineta as the sister group of Lepidosauria. The inclusion of Sophineta displaced the relictual Middle Jurassic Marmoretta and gave the origin of Lepidosauria a much older age. The cladogram below follows their results.

- Diapsida
  - Araeoscelidia
  - Neodiapsida
    - Youngina
    - Coelurosauravus
    - Saurosternon
    - Sauria
      - Prolacerta
      - Lepidosauromorpha
        - - Paliguana
          - Kuehneosauridae
        - - Marmoretta
          - - Sophineta
            - Lepidosauria
              - Gephyrosaurus
              - Squamata
