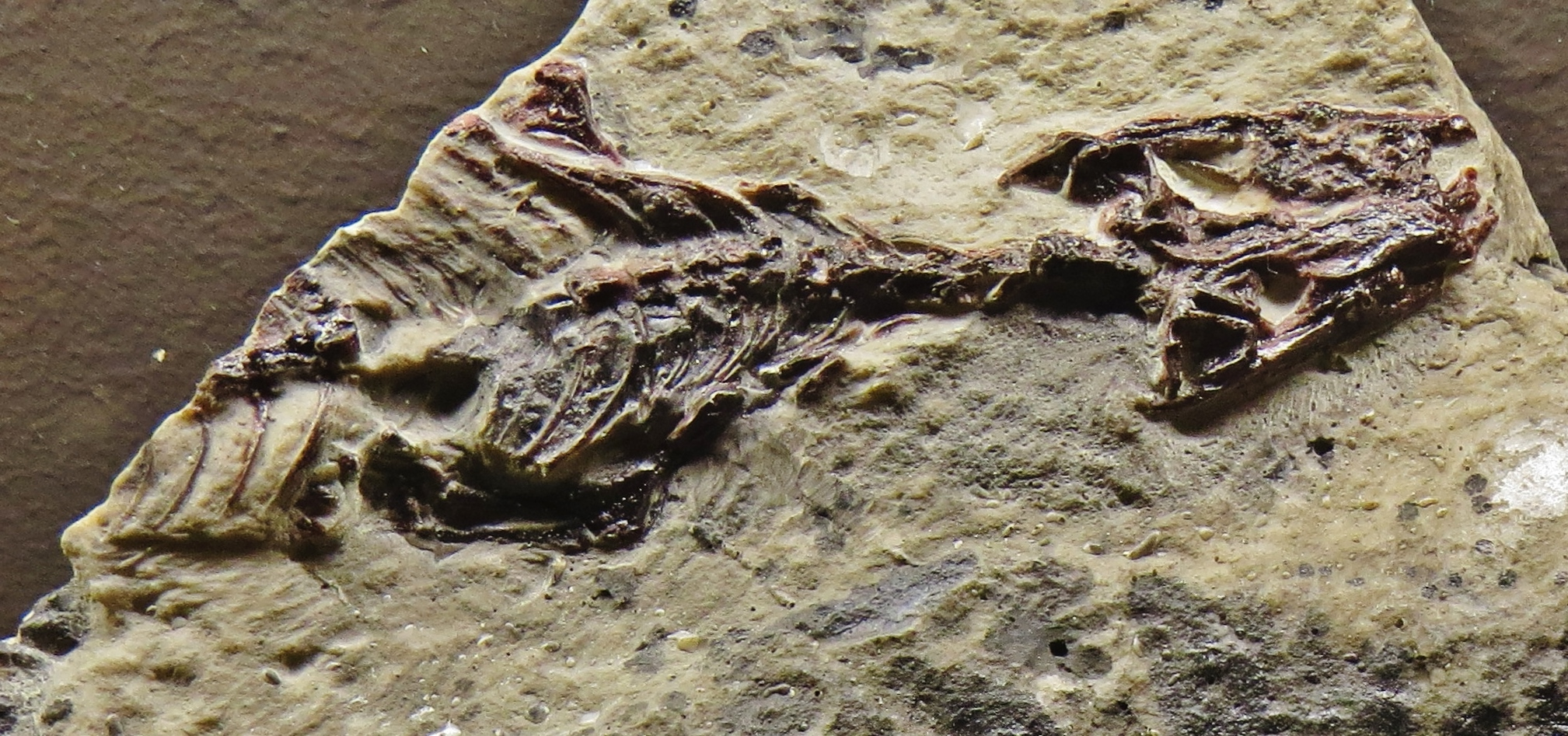
- Megachirella wachtleri, Museum of Nature South Tyrol, Bolzano, Italy

Scientific classification
- Kingdom: Animalia
- Phylum: Chordata
- Class: Reptilia
- Clade: Lepidosauromorpha
- Genus: †Megachirella; Renesto and Posenato, 2003

Type species
- †Megachirella wachtleri Renesto and Posenato, 2003

= Megachirella =

Megachirella Temporal range: Middle Triassic, 240 Ma

Extinct genus of reptiles

Megachirella is an extinct genus of lepidosauromorph that lived about 240 million years ago during the Middle Triassic and contains only one known species, Megachirella wachtleri. It is known from a partial skeleton discovered in the Dolomites of Northern Italy and was described in 2003.

== Description ==
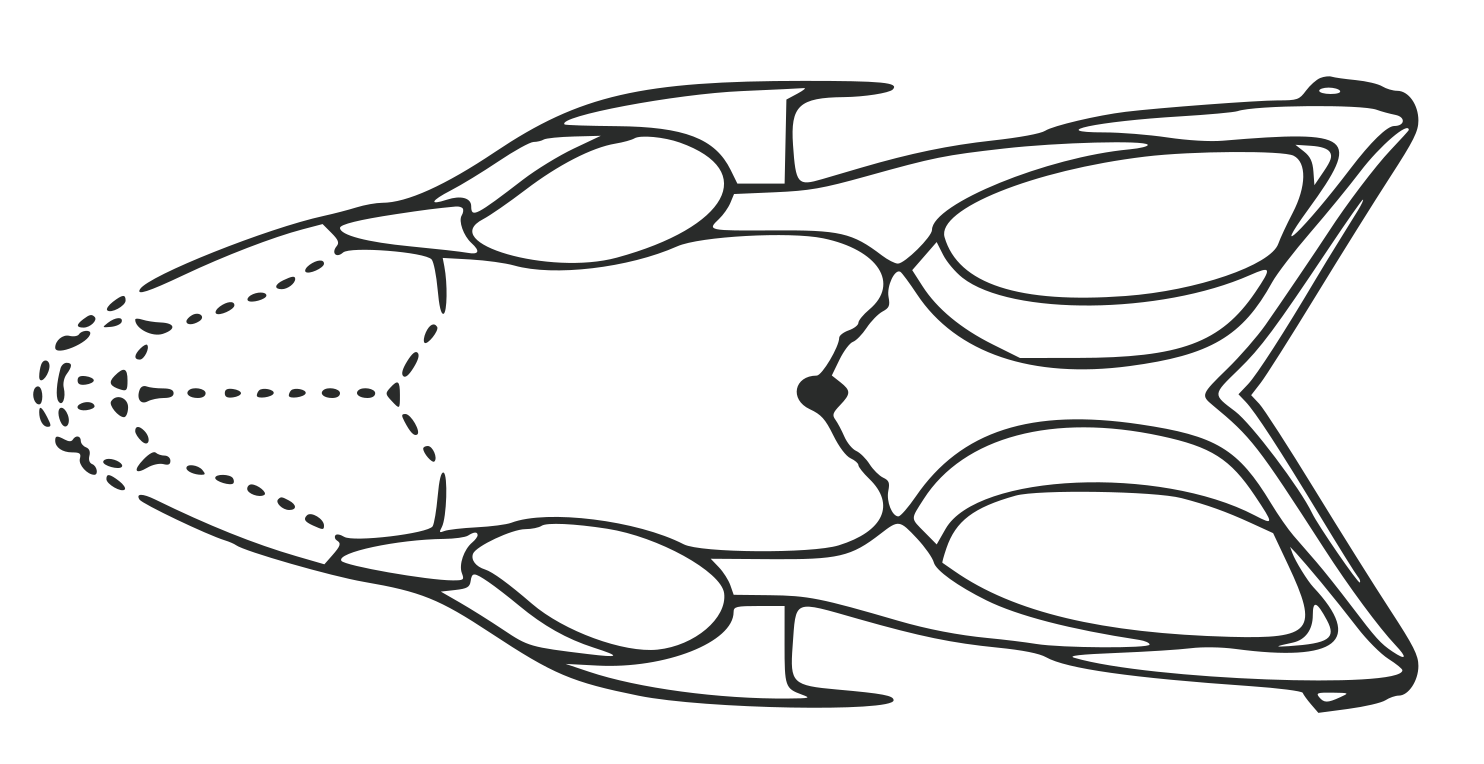
Restoration of the skull in dorsal view

Megachirella is known exclusively from a partial skeleton, preserved in anatomical connection. The find includes an almost complete skull, the front half of the body and part of the front legs. The skull, although devoid of the front part of the snout, is rather robust and large; the neck is moderately elongated and the front legs are large and strong. The dimensions do not exceed 15 cm (5.9 in) in length, and the appearance is similar to that of a strong-legged lizard.

== Classification ==
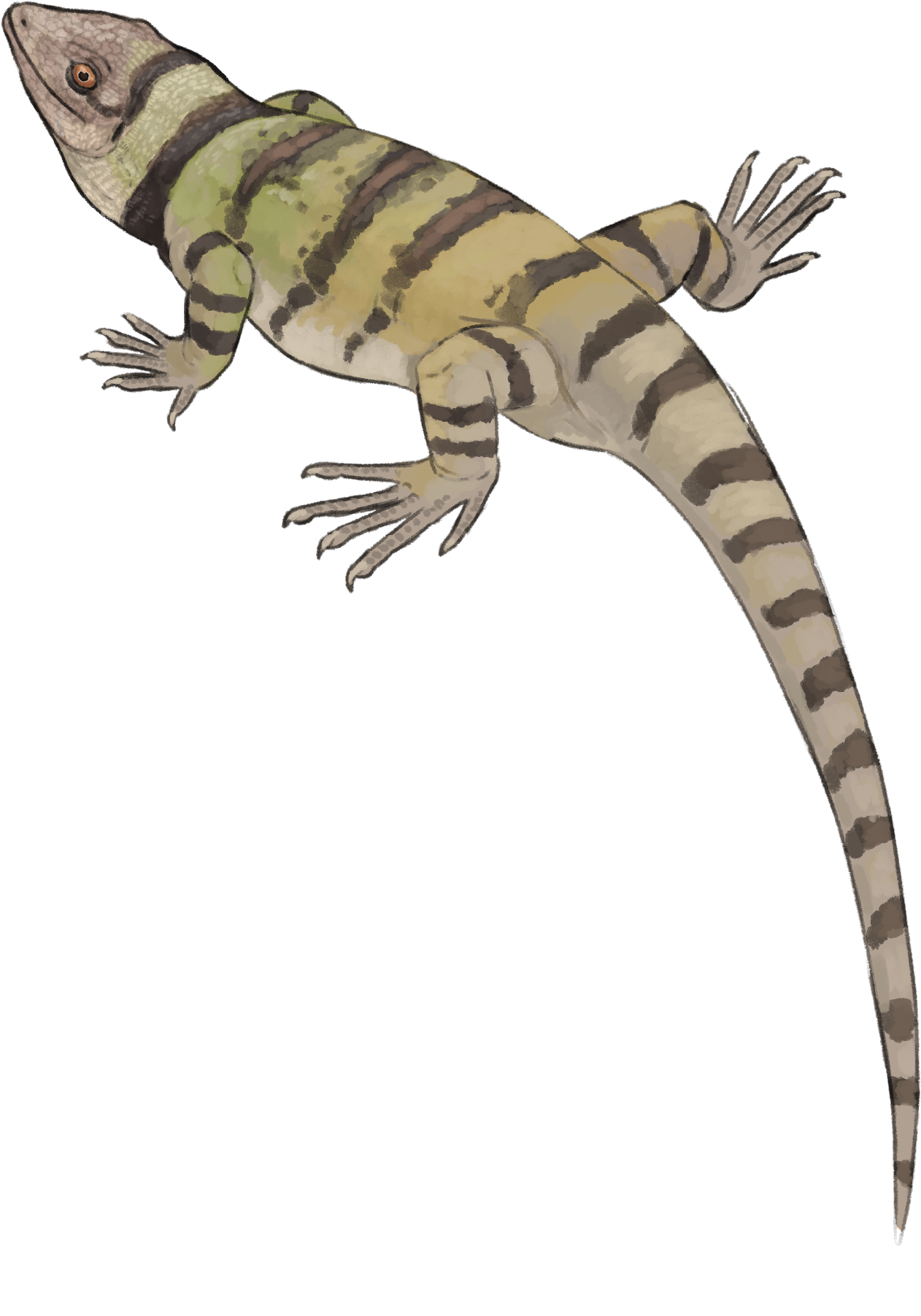
Life restoration

Megachirella was discovered in the Dont Formation of the area of Braies, in South Tyrol, and described in 2003. It was classified as a member of Lepidosauromorpha, the clade of reptiles that includes lizards, snakes, the tuatara and their closest extinct relatives, at the time. In particular, the fossils show some similarities, mainly in the skull, with some primitive forms such as the Eolacertilia. A phylogenetics analysis in 2013 confirmed that it was a lepidosauromorph closely related to the crown group Lepidosauria.

A study in 2018, led by Tiago R. Simōes from the University of Alberta, found that Megachirella was a stem-squamate, making it the oldest known member of the order Squamata, the order that includes lizards, snakes and amphisbaenians (worm lizards). The study was conducted by performing high-resolution microfocus X-ray computed tomography (micro-CT) scans on the fossil specimen of Megachirella to gather detailed data about its anatomy. This data was then compared with a phylogenetic dataset combining the morphological and molecular data of 129 extant (living) and extinct reptilian taxa. The comparison revealed Megachirella had certain features that are unique to squamates. The study also found that geckoes are the earliest crown group squamates, not iguanians. However, a 2021 study found the genus to be a lepidosaur of uncertain position, in a polytomy with Squamata and Rhynchocephalia. In 2025, Marke and colleagues recovered Megachirella as a basal lepidosauromorph within a clade that includes Fraxinisaura and Marmoretta.

== Paleobiology ==
Despite being found in marine deposits, the fossil of Megachirella shows no adaptation to aquatic life. On the contrary, characteristics like the strong front legs, the shape of the claws, the well-ossified carpus and the hollow ribs lead one to think that this animal was well adapted to a terrestrial lifestyle. The specimen was probably transported to a shallow coastal environment due to heavy storms after it died.
