= Paliguana =

Paliguana Temporal range: Earliest Triassic 252 Ma
- Holotype skull

Scientific classification
- Kingdom: Animalia
- Phylum: Chordata
- Class: Reptilia
- Clade: Lepidosauromorpha
- Family: †Paliguanidae
- Genus: †Paliguana; Broom 1903

Type species
- †Paliguana whitei Broom 1903

Extinct reptile genus

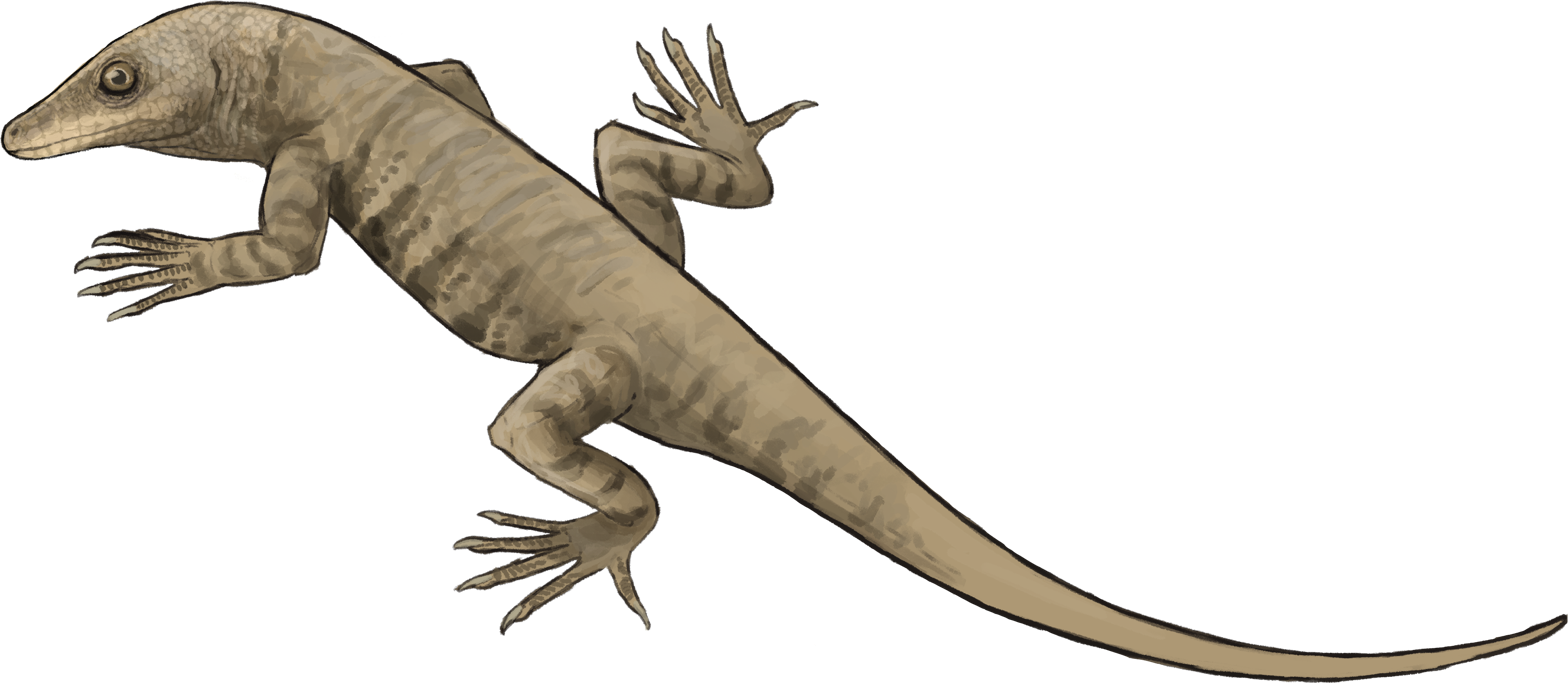
Life restoration

Paliguana is an extinct genus of lizard-like lepidosauromorph reptile. It is known from a single somewhat poorly preserved skull around 3 centimetres (1.2 in) in length from the earliest Triassic Katberg Formation (Beaufort Group) in the upper Lystrosaurus Assemblage Zone of South Africa. It is currently the earliest known lepidosauromorph.

Cladogram after Ford et al., 2021:

- Lepidosauromorpha
  - - Paliguana
    - Marmoretta
    - Fraxinisaura
  - Lepidosauria
    - Megachirella
    - Squamata
    - Sophineta
    - - Vellbergia
      - Rhynchocephalia
