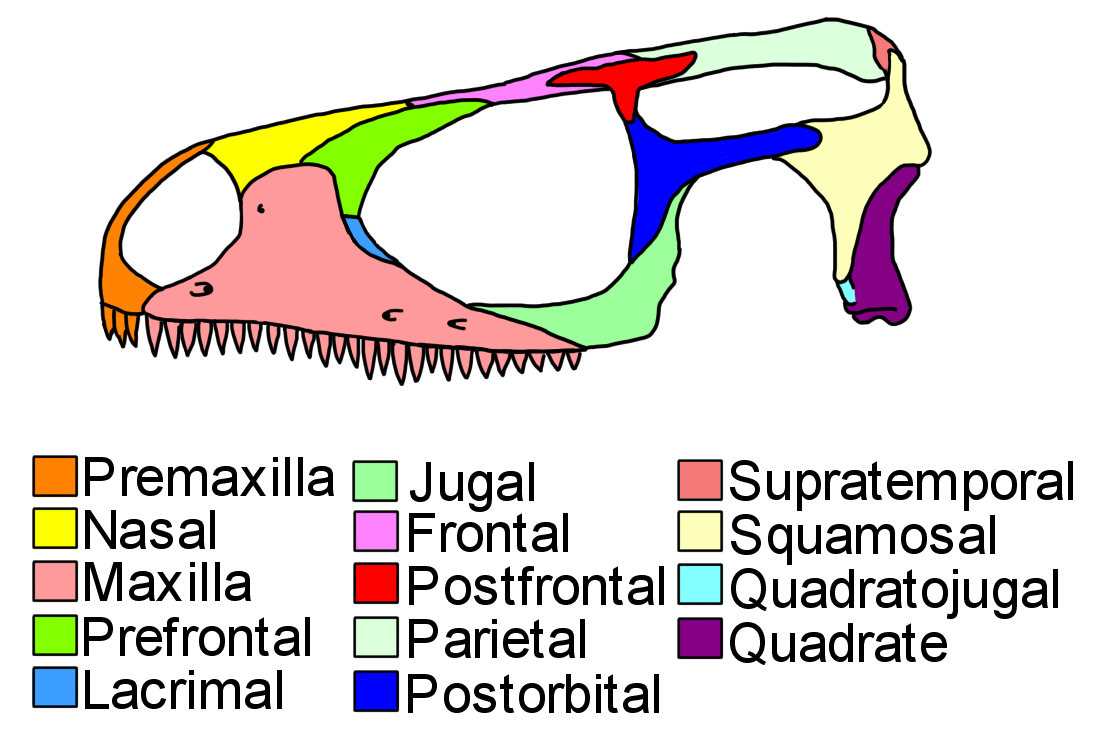
- Skull of Sophineta cracoviensis
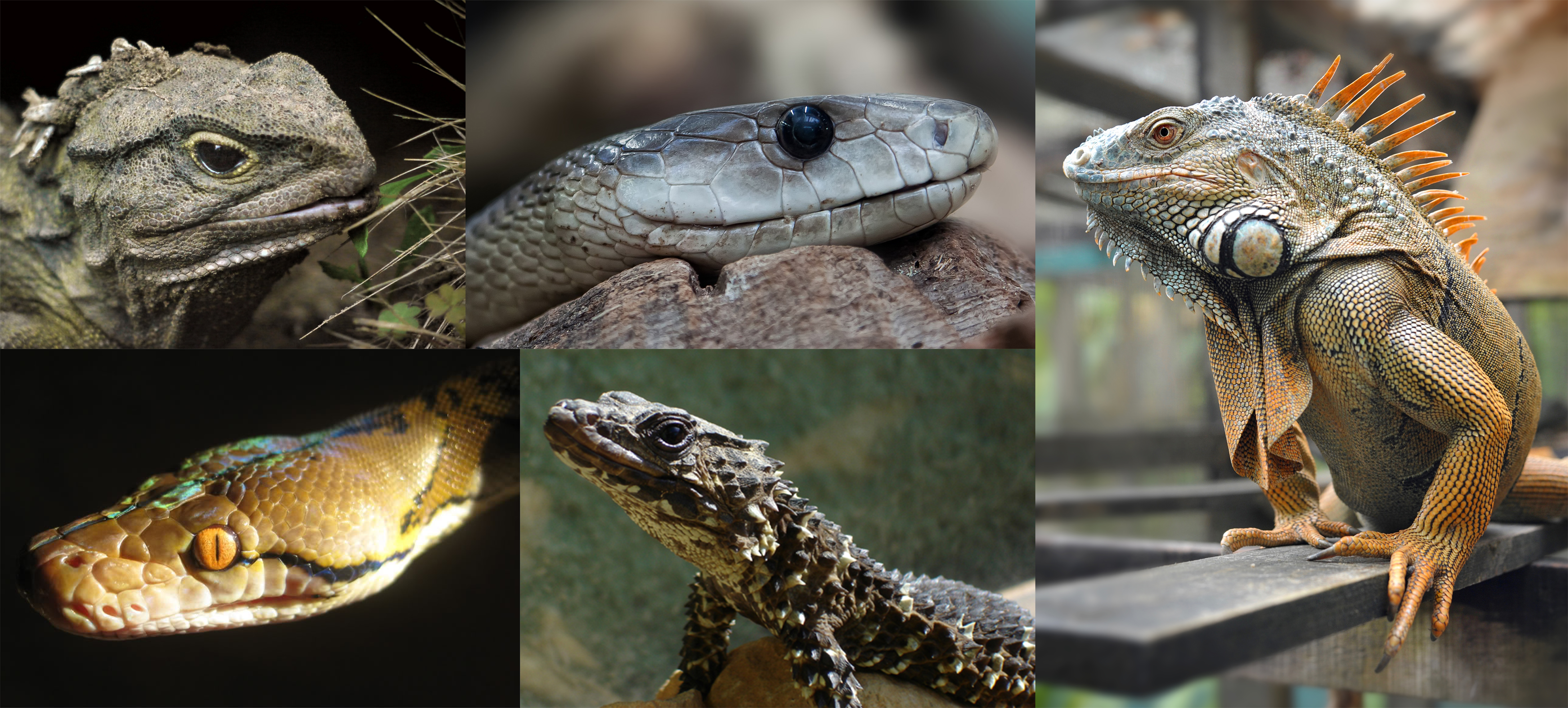
- Collage of five lepidosaurs. From top left to right: Sphenodon punctatus, Dendroaspis polylepis, Iguana iguana, Smaug breyeri and Malayopython reticulatus.

Scientific classification
- Kingdom: Animalia
- Phylum: Chordata
- Class: Reptilia
- Clade: Sauria
- Clade: Lepidosauromorpha; Benton, 1983

Subgroups
- See text.

Synonyms
- Ankylopoda (obsolete clade); Pan-Lepidosauria Gauthier & de Queiroz, 2020

= Lepidosauromorpha =

Lepidosauromorphs Temporal range: Earliest Triassic - Holocene, 252–0 Ma

Clade of reptiles

Lepidosauromorpha (in PhyloCode known as Pan-Lepidosauria) is a group of reptiles comprising all diapsids closer to lizards than to archosaurs (extant archosaurs are crocodiles and birds). The only living sub-group is the Lepidosauria, which contains two subdivisions, Squamata, which contains lizards and snakes, and Rhynchocephalia, the only extant species of which is the tuatara.

The defining characters (synapomorphies) ancestral for Lepidosauromorpha include several characters of the skull and lower jaws, including the reduction in the size of the lacrimal bone, the posterior process (extension/growth) of the jugal bone being short, reduced or absent interdental (between teeth) plates/laminae, and the wall of bone enclosing the teeth from the mouth on the inner surface of the upper and lower jaws being reduced or absent, corresponding with the development of an ancestrally pleurodont dentition. Members of the group are ancestrally and are almost exclusively (with the exception of mosasaurs) ectothermic (cold-blooded). Members of the group generally have a sprawling posture.

While some putative stem-lepidosauromorphs like Palaeagama are known from the Late Permian, the oldest definitive lepidosauromorphs, Sophineta and Paliguana, are known from the Early Triassic. Taytalura from the early Late Triassic of Argentina is the most complete fossil of an early lepidosauromorph and is one of the few fossils robustly inferred as an early evolving lepidosauromorph. The Kuehneosauridae, a family of reptiles with elongated ribs which allowed them to glide akin to living gliding lizards have been historically typically considered early lepidosauromorphs. However, several recent studies have been found them in other positions within Sauria, including Archosauromorpha.

Almost all non-lepidosaurian lepidosauromorphs became extinct by the end of the Triassic, with the latest non lepidosaur-lepidosauromorphs being Marmoretta from the Middle-Late Jurassic of Britain and Iberia, and an indeterminate form from the Middle Jurassic Moskvoretskaya Formation of Russia, which appear to be closely related to Fraxinisaura from the Middle Triassic of Germany. Other studies have recovered Marmoretta as a stem-squamate.

== Subgroups ==
- †Kuehneosauridae?
- †Choristodera?
- †Helveticosauridae?
- †Airistagiz
- †Cargninia
- †Coartaredens?
- †Feralisaurus?
- †Fraxinisaura
- †Hohlachia
- †Klainjosaura
- †Lacertulus?
- †Marmoretta
- †Megachirella
- †Paliguana
- †Pamelina?
- †Sophineta
- †Tamaulipasaurus
- †Taytalura?
- †Vellbergia
- †Vinitasaura
- Lepidosauria
  - Rhynchocephalia
  - Squamata

=== Phylogeny ===
Cladogram after Sobral and Schoch, 2026 with equal-weights parsimony:

- Lepidosauromorpha
  - †Paliguana
  - - - †Airistagiz
      - †Hohlachia
    - - †Sophineta
      - - †Vellbergia
        - - †Fraxinisaura
          - †Marmoretta
      - Rhynchocephalia
      - - †Megachirella
        - Squamata

Strict consensus cladogram also after Sobral and Schoch, 2026.

- Sauria
  - Archosauromorpha
  - Lepidosauromorpha
    - Paliguana whitei
    - - - Airistagiz seegisi
        - Hohlachia multidens
      - Lepidosauria
        - Rhynchocephalia
          - Taytalura alcoberi
          - - - Diphydontosaurus avonis
              - Gephyrosaurus bridensis
            - - Sphenodontia
        - Pan-Squamata
          - - Vellbergia bartholomaei
            - - Fraxinisaura rozynekae
              - Marmoretta oxoniensis
          - - Sophineta cracoviensis
            - - Megachirella wachtleri
              - Squamata
