= Hongshanxi =

Hongshanxi Temporal range: Oxfordian

Scientific classification
- Kingdom: Animalia
- Phylum: Chordata
- Class: Reptilia
- Order: Squamata
- Genus: †Hongshanxi
- Species: †H. xiei

Binomial name
- †Hongshanxi xiei Dong et al., 2019

Extinct genus of lizard

Hongshanxi is an extinct genus of lizard that lived in Liaoning, China during the Oxfordian stage of the Late Jurassic epoch.

== Taxonomy ==
Hongshanxi xiei, the type species, has an uncertain phylogenetic position, with it fluctuating depending on the position of Gekkota within Squamata.
