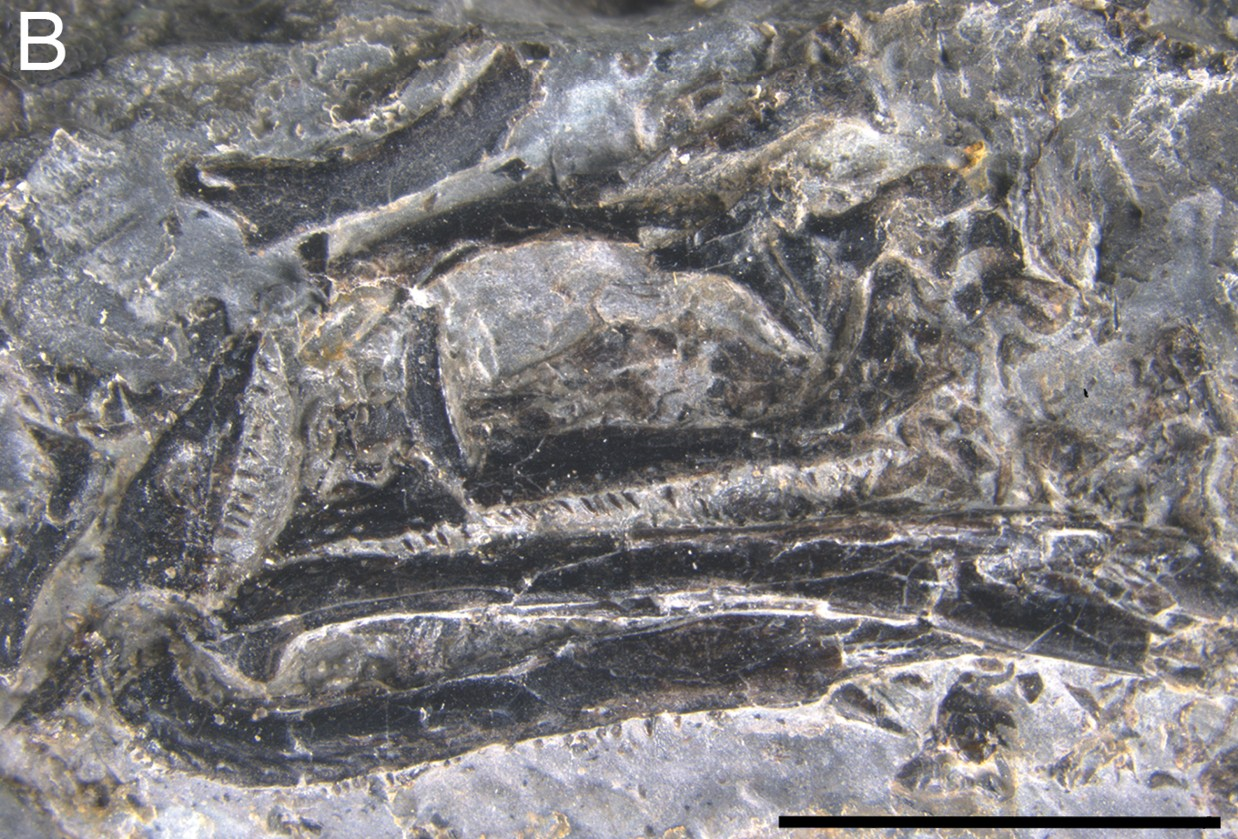
- Holotype specimen

Scientific classification
- Kingdom: Animalia
- Phylum: Chordata
- Class: Reptilia
- Clade: Lepidosauromorpha
- Genus: †Vellbergia; Sobral et al., 2020

Type species
- †Vellbergia bartholomaei Sobral et al., 2020

= Vellbergia =

Vellbergia Temporal range: Middle Triassic Ladinian

Extinct genus of reptiles

Vellbergia is an extinct genus of lepidosauromorph from the Middle Triassic of Germany. It contains a single species, Vellbergia bartholomaei, which is based on a tiny partial skull from the Ladinian-age Lower Keuper. Some studies have found it to be a crown group lepidosaur, closely related to Rhynchocephalia.

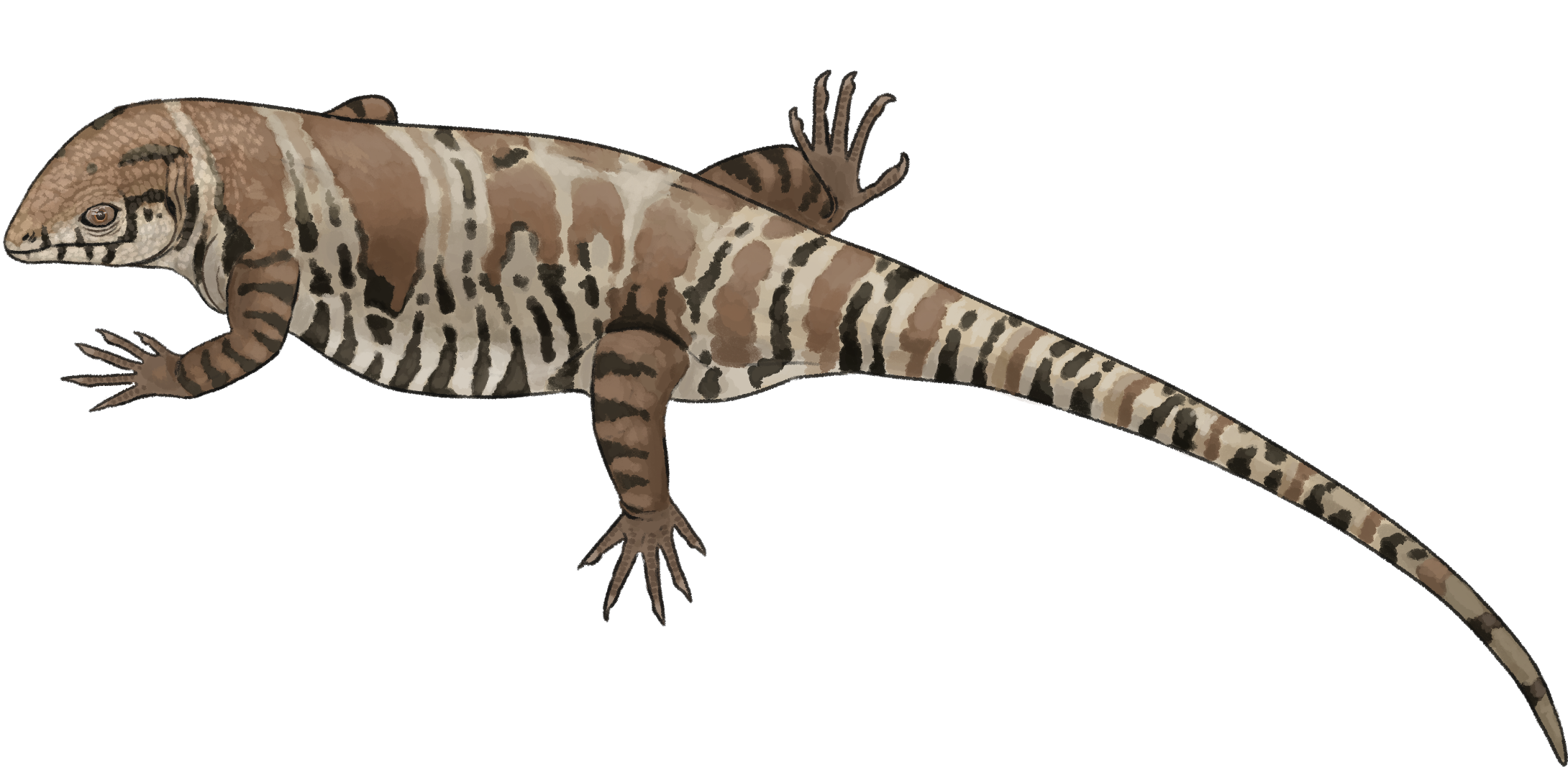
Speculative life restoration
