= Marmoretta =

Marmoretta Temporal range: Middle-Late Jurassic Bathonian–Kimmeridgian
- Skull of Marmoretta

Scientific classification
- Kingdom: Animalia
- Phylum: Chordata
- Class: Reptilia
- Clade: Lepidosauromorpha
- Genus: †Marmoretta; Evans, 1991

Type species
- †Marmoretta oxoniensis Evans, 1991

Other species
- †M. drescherae Guillaume et al., 2025

Extinct genus of reptiles

Marmoretta is an extinct genus of small lepidosauromorph reptile known from the Middle-Late Jurassic of Britain and Portugal. The genus contains two species, M. oxoniensis and M. drescherae.

== Discovery and naming ==
Marmoretta is known from holotype BMNH R.12020, the anterior region of a right maxilla. All specimens are housed in the Natural History Museum. They were collected from the Mammal Bed of the Forest Marble Formation, at Kirtlington Quarry, Oxfordshire, which has yielded a rich assemblage of small vertebrates including mammals, frogs, salamanders and other small reptiles. Marmoretta is very common in that locality but its remains are fragmentary. In 1994, additional specimens of Marmoretta were described from the Kilmaluag Formation (previously known as the Ostracod Limestones) of the Great Estuarine Group in Skye. This material of Marmoretta includes the first associated skull and postcranial remains. They confirm the original description and reconstruction, and provide additional support for position of Marmoretta as the sister taxon of Lepidosauria. Both localities dates to the Late Bathonian stage of the Middle Jurassic period, about 166.2-164.7 million years ago. In 2021, the Skye material was redescribed with CT scanning, and was found to slightly differ from the specimens from Oxford, with a different arrangement of palatal teeth and a differently shaped parabasisphenoid.

Marmoretta was first described and named by Susan E. Evans in 1991 and the type species is Marmoretta oxoniensis. The generic name is derived from Latin marmoros, meaning "Marble" and refers to the Forest Marble Formation - the source of the initial specimens of Marmoretta. The specific name is derived from Oxonia, the Latinised form of "Oxford", in reference to Oxfordshire. In 2025, Guillaume and colleagues named the second species M. drescherae based on remains discovered from the Late Jurassic (Kimmeridgian) Alcobaça Formation in Portugal.

== Description ==
Marmoretta oxoneiensis was a relatively small reptile, with a skull that varied in length from around 1 centimetre (0.39 in), probably as a hatchling to a maximum of 4 centimetres (1.6 in) as a fully grown adult. The skull has large upper and lower temporal fenestrae. The premaxillae bones at the front of the snout are paired, and have a distinctive facet at their posterior where they join the maxilla. The frontal and parietal bones of the skull are fused. The frontal bones are narrow, and the parietals lack a pineal foramen. The skull has a prominent sagittal crest. The vertebrae are amphicoelous, that is both of the faces are concave (curved inward). The penultimate (second closest to the tips of the digits) phalanges of the hands are elongate and curved, the terminal ungual phalanges forming the tips of the digits of the hand are narrow but deep and have a curved underside.

== Ecology ==
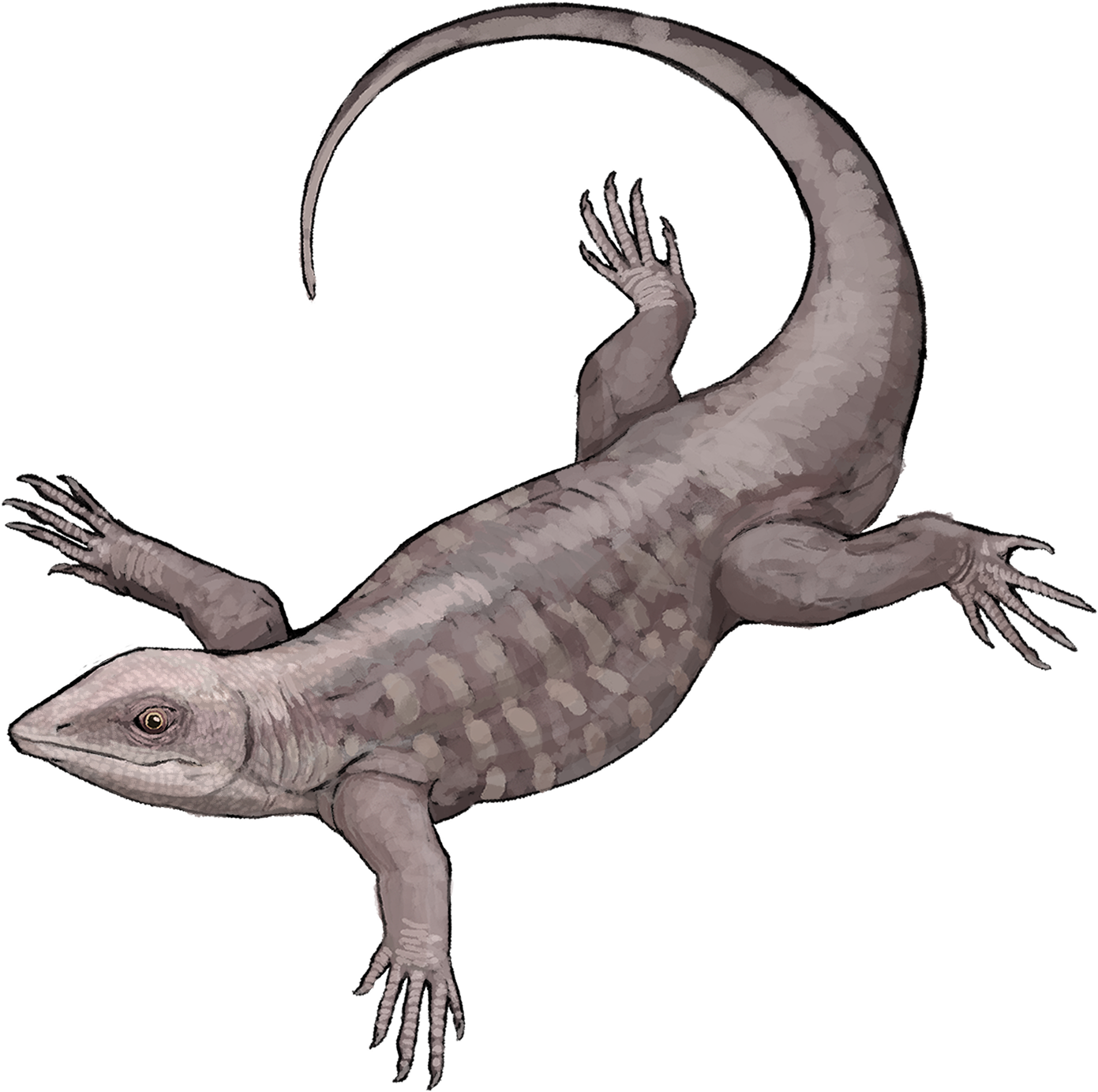
Life restoration

While originally interpreted as semi-aquatic, due to the relative abundance of finds in the Kirtlington Mammal Bed, thought to have been deposited in an aquatic environment, the shape of the hand bones, which are similar to those of living arboreal lizards suggests that Marmoretta habitually engaged in climbing and that it likely spent much of its time in trees.

== Classification ==
Susan E. Evans and Magdalena Borsuk−Białynicka (2009) performed a phylogenetic analysis that recovered Sophineta as the sister group of Lepidosauria. The inclusion of Sophineta displaced the relictual Middle Jurassic Marmoretta and gave the origin of Lepidosauria much older age. The cladogram below follows their results. Some subsequent phylogenies have recovered Marmoretta as a stem-squamate, closer to squamates than to rhynchocephalians. In the 2021 redescription, it was found to be a basal lepidosauromorph, most closely related to Fraxinisaura from the Middle Triassic of Germany.

Cladogram after Griffiths, 2021:

- - Lepidosauromorpha
    - - Marmoretta
      - Fraxinisaura
    - Lepidosauria
      - Rhynchocephalia
      - - Sophineta
        - - Megachirella
          - - Huehuecuetzpalli
            - - Eichstaettisaurus
              - Squamata crown group
