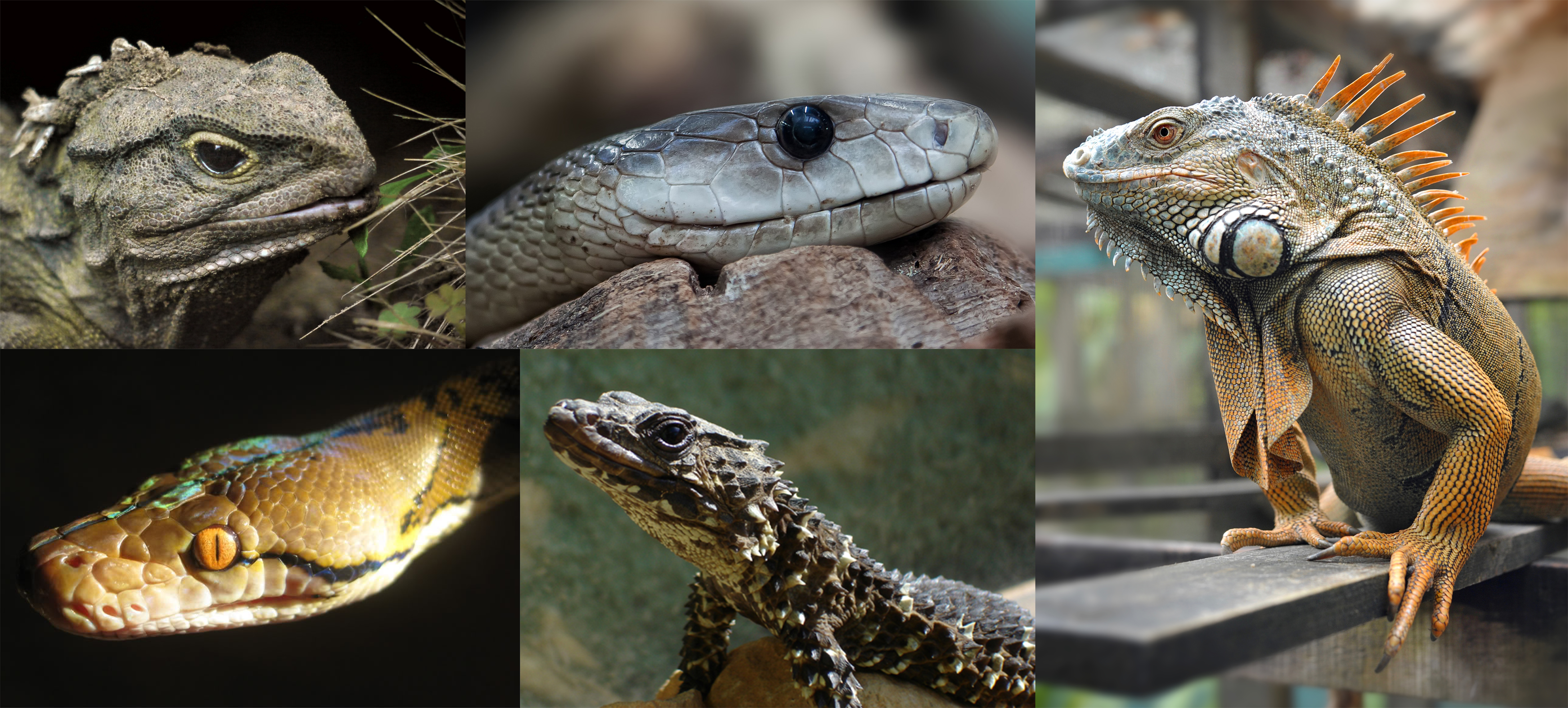
- Collage of five lepidosaurs. Clockwise from top left: tuatara, black mamba, green iguana, Smaug breyeri and reticulated python

Scientific classification
- Kingdom: Animalia
- Phylum: Chordata
- Class: Reptilia
- Clade: Lepidosauromorpha
- Superorder: Lepidosauria; Haeckel, 1866

Orders and genera
- Rhynchocephalia; †Vellbergia?; Pan-Squamata; †Sophineta?; †Megachirella?; †Marmoretta?; †Tamaulipasaurus?; †Hongshanxi; †Bellairsia; †Oculudentavis; †Huehuecuetzpalli; †Parviraptoridae?; Squamata

= Lepidosauria =

Lepidosauria Temporal range: Middle Triassic - Present, 244–0 Ma

Superorder of reptiles

The Lepidosauria (/ˌlɛpɪdoʊˈsɔːriə/, from Greek meaning scaled lizards) is a superorder of reptiles, containing the orders Squamata and Rhynchocephalia. Squamata, comprising lizards and snakes, contains over 9,000 species, making it by far the most species-rich and diverse order of non-avian reptiles in the present day. Rhynchocephalia was a formerly widespread and diverse group of reptiles in the Mesozoic Era. However, it is represented by only one living species: the tuatara (Sphenodon punctatus), a superficially lizard-like reptile native to New Zealand.

Lepidosauria is a monophyletic group (i.e. a clade), containing all descendants of the last common ancestor of squamates and rhynchocephalians. Lepidosaurs can be distinguished from other reptiles via several traits, such as large keratinous scales which may overlap one another. Purely in the context of modern taxa, Lepidosauria can be considered the sister taxon to Archelosauria, which includes Testudines (turtles), Aves (birds) and Crocodilia (crocodilians). Lepidosauria is encompassed by Lepidosauromorpha, a broader group defined as all reptiles (living or extinct) closer to lepidosaurs than to archosaurs.

== Evolution ==
Lepidosauromorpha is thought to have split from their sister group, Archelosauria, during the Permian period. The earliest members of Lepidosauromorpha date to the Early Triassic. The oldest known definitive lepidosaur is the rhynchocephalian Agriodontosaurus from the Helsby Sandstone Formation of the United Kingdom, dating to the upper Anisian stage of the Middle Triassic, approximately 244 to 241.5 million years ago. The next earliest rhynchocephalian, Wirtembergia, is known from the Ladinian stage of the Middle Triassic. Sophineta is known from older rocks in the Early Triassic, but its exact placement within the broader clade Lepidosauromorpha is uncertain and it may not be a true lepidosaur. While the lepidosaur Megachirella may represent a stem-group squamate from the Middle Triassic, the earliest modern members of the group are known from the Middle Jurassic. Squamates underwent a great radiation in the Cretaceous, while rhynchocephalians declined during the same time period.

== Description ==
Extant reptiles are in the clade Diapsida, named for the two pairs of temporal fenestrae present on the skull behind the eye socket. Until recently, Diapsida was said to be composed of Lepidosauria and their sister taxa Archosauria. The Lepidosauria is then split into Squamata and Rhynchocephalia. More recent morphological studies and molecular studies also place turtles firmly within Diapsida, even though they lack temporal fenestrations.

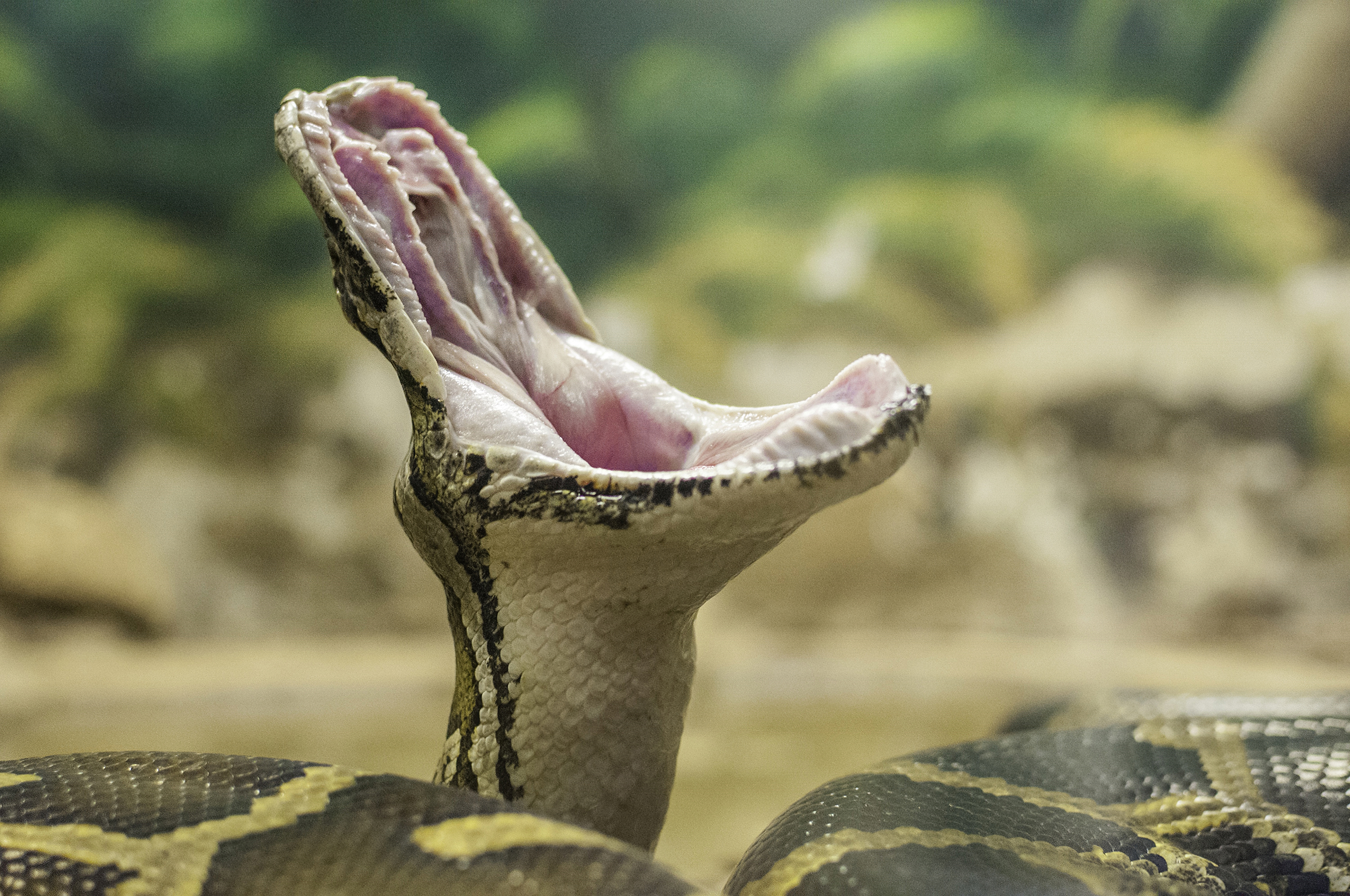
The quadrate bone is particularly elongated in snakes, to facilitate cranial kinesis

The reptiles in the Lepidosauria can be distinguished from other reptiles by a variety of characteristics. Lepidosaurs are suggested to be distinguished from more primitive lepidosauromorphs by the development of a conch on the quadrate, allowing for the development of a tympanic membrane in the ear (a trait lost in the tuatara, but present in early rhynchocephalians), as well as the development of a subolfactory process on the frontal bones of the skull.

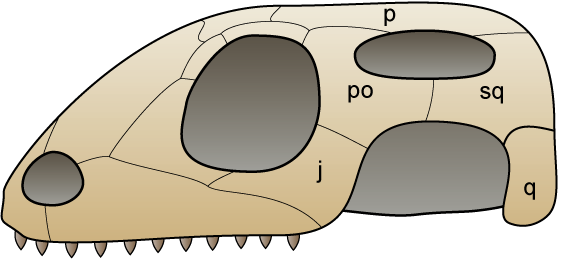
Schematic skull of a squamate showing the location of major dermal bones

The group Squamata includes snakes, lizards, and amphisbaenians. Squamata can be characterized by the reduction or loss of limbs. Snakes and legless lizards have evolved the complete loss of their limbs. The upper jaw of Squamates is movable on the cranium, a configuration called kinesis. This is made possible by a loose connection between the quadrate and its neighboring bones. Without this, snakes would not be able consume prey that are much larger than themselves. Amphisbaenians are mostly legless like snakes, but are generally much smaller. Three species of amphisbaenians have kept reduced front limbs and these species are known for actively burrowing in the ground. The tuatara and some extinct rhynchocephalians have a more rigid skull with a complete lower temporal bar closing the lower temporal fenestra formed by the fusion of the jugal and quadrate/quadratojugal bones, similar to the condition found in primitive diapsids. However early rhynchocephalians and lepidosauromorphs had an open lower temporal fenestra, without a complete temporal bar, so this is thought to be a reversion rather than retention. The temporal bar is thought to stabilise the skull during biting.

Male squamates have evolved a pair of hemipenises instead of a single penis with erectile tissue that is found in crocodilians, birds, mammals, and turtles. The hemipenis can be found in the base of the tail. The tuatara does not have a hemipenis, but instead has shallow paired outpocketings of the posterior wall of the cloaca.

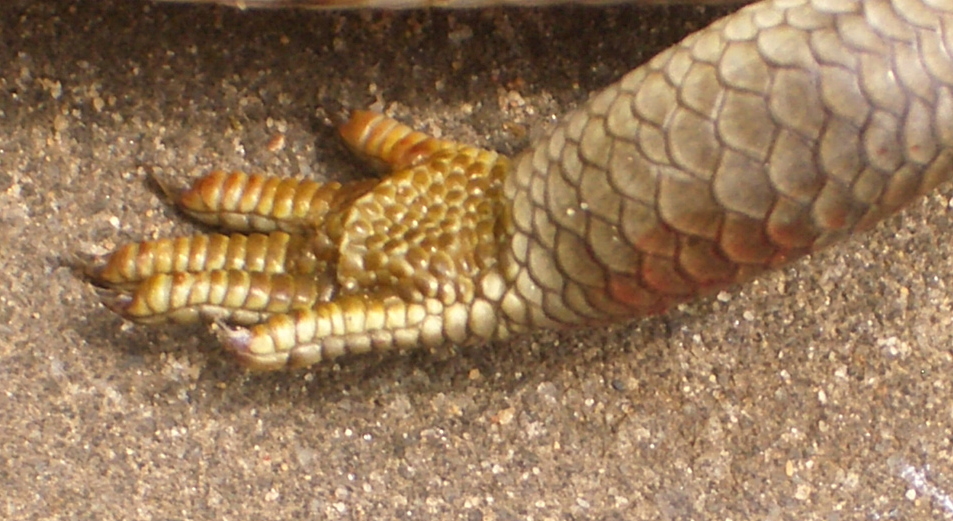
The foot of a skink, showing lepidosaurs' characteristic overlapping scales

Second, most lepidosaurs have the ability to autotomize their tails. However, this trait has been lost on some recent species. In lizards and rhynchocephalians, fracture planes are present within the vertebrae of the tail that allow for its removal. Some lizards have multiple fracture planes, while others just have a single fracture plane. The regrowth of the tail is not always complete and is made of a solid rod of cartilage rather than individual vertebrae. In snakes, the tail separates between vertebrae and some do not experience regrowth.

Third, the scales in lepidosaurs are horny (keratinized) structures of the epidermis, allowing them to be shed collectively, contrary to the scutes seen in other reptiles. This is done in different cycles, depending on the species. However, lizards generally shed in flakes while snakes shed in one piece. Unlike scutes, lepidosaur scales will often overlap like roof tiles.

== Biology and ecology ==
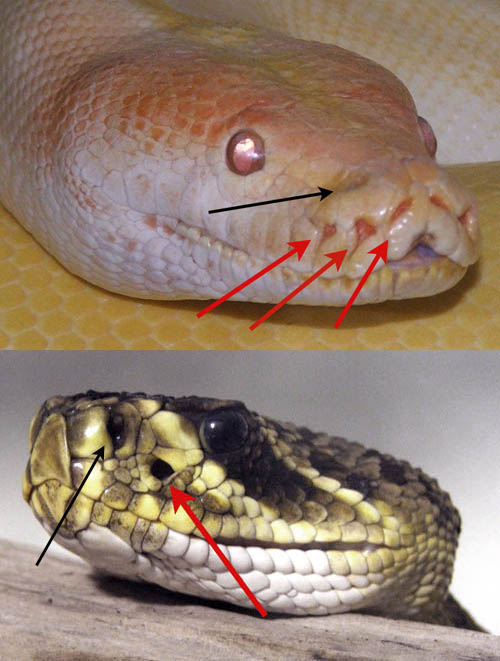
Python (top) and rattlesnake (bottom) featuring pit organs for infrared sensing. Red arrows indicating pit organs and black arrows pointing to the nostrils

Squamates are represented by viviparous, ovoviviparous, and oviparous species. Viviparous means that the female gives birth to live young, Ovoviviparous means that the egg will develop inside the female's body and Oviparous means that the female lays eggs. A few species within Squamata have the ability to reproduce asexually. The tuatara lays eggs that are usually about one inch in length and which take about 14 months to incubate.

While in the egg, the Squamata embryo develops an egg tooth on the premaxillary that helps the animal emerge from the egg. A reptile will increase three to twentyfold in length from hatching to adulthood. There are three main life history events that lepidosaurs reach: hatching/birth, sexual maturity, and reproductive senility.

Because gular pumping is so common in squamates, and is also found in the tuatara, it is assumed that it is an original trait in the group.

Most lepidosaurs rely on camouflage as one of their main defenses. Some species have evolved to blend in with their ecosystem, while others are able to change their skin color to blend in with their current surroundings. The ability to autotomize the tail is another defense that is common among lepidosaurs. Other species, such as the Echinosauria, have evolved the defense of feigning death.

=== Hunting and diet ===
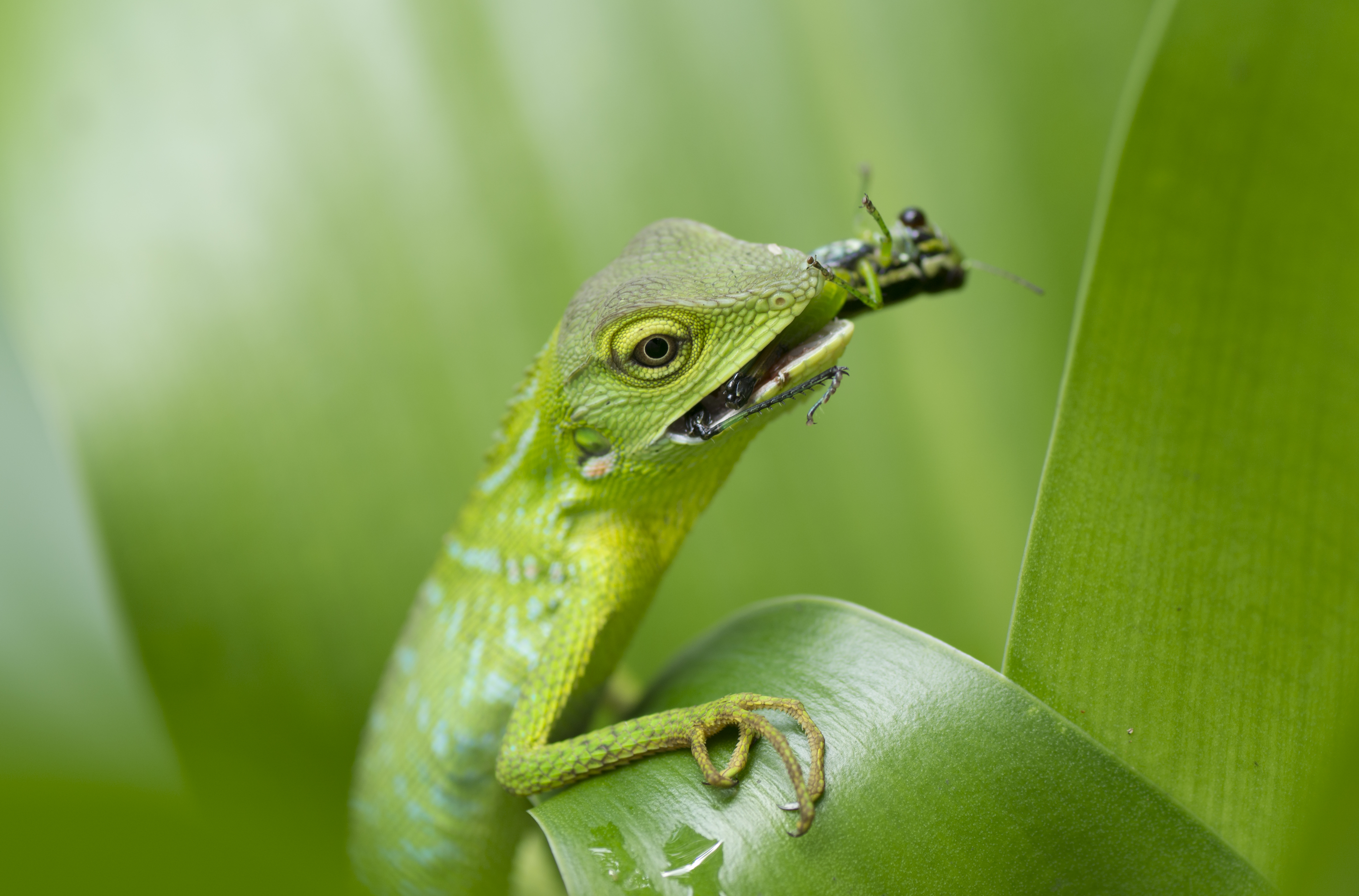
A green crested lizard feeding on an invertebrate

Viperines can sense their prey's infrared radiation through bare nerve endings on the skin of their heads. Also, viperines and some boids have thermal receptors that allow them to target their prey's heat. Many snakes are able to obtain their prey through constriction. This is done by first biting the prey, then coiling their body around the prey. The snake then tightens its grip as the prey struggles, which leads to suffocation. Some snakes have fangs that produce venomous bites, which allows the snake to consume unconscious, or even dead, prey. Also, some venoms include a proteolytic component that aids in digestion. Chameleons grasp their prey with a projectile tongue. This is made possible by a hyoid mechanism, which is the contraction of the hyoid muscle that drives the tip of the tongue outwards.

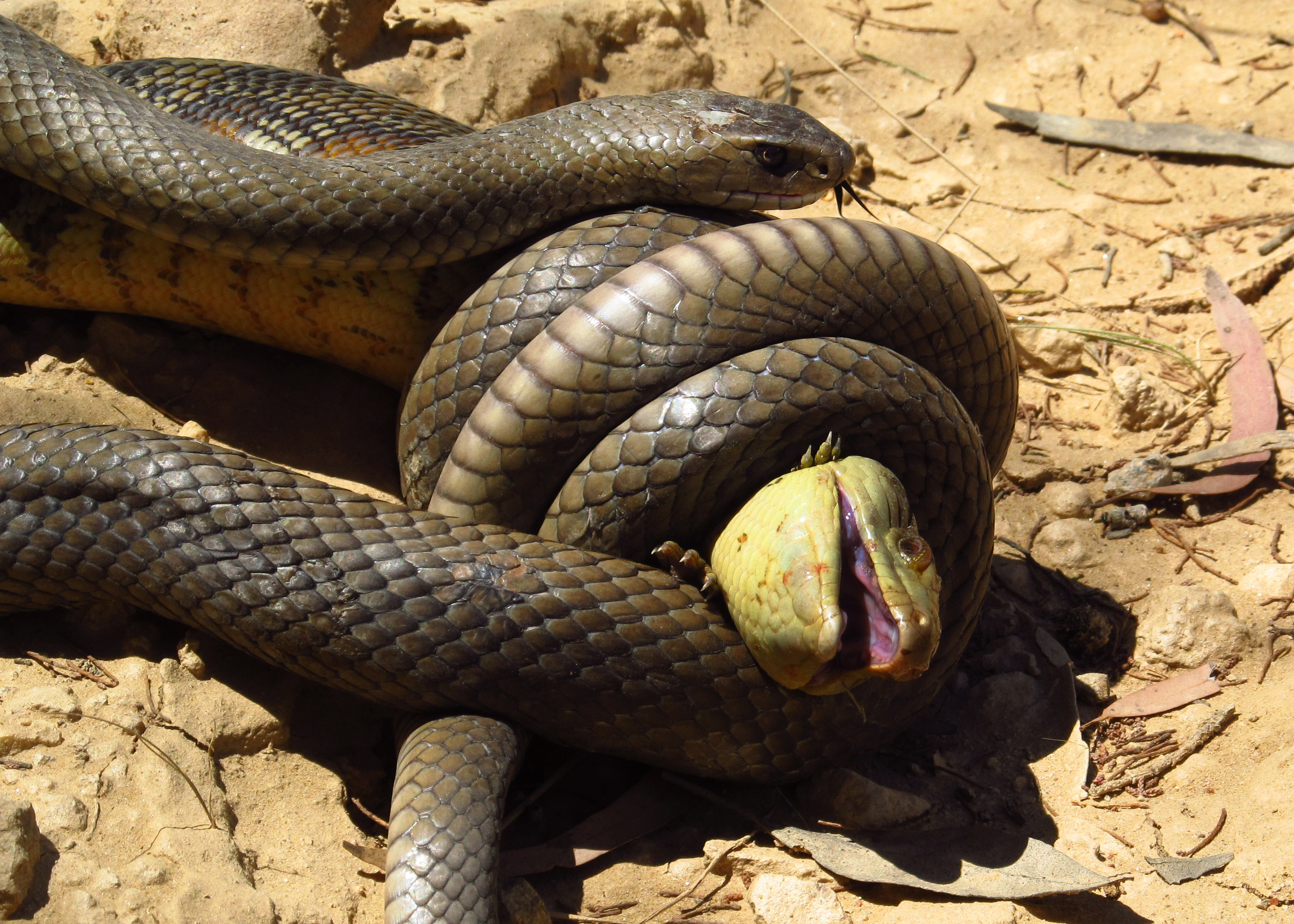
An eastern blue-tongued lizard preyed upon by an eastern brown snake

Within the Lepidosauria there are herbivores, omnivores, insectivores, and carnivores. The herbivores consist of iguanines, some agamids, and some skinks. Most lizard species and some snake species are insectivores. The remaining snake species, tuataras, and amphisbaenians, are carnivores. While some snake species are generalist, others eat a narrow range of prey - for example, Salvadora only eat lizards. The remaining lizards are omnivores and can consume plants or insects. The broad carnivorous diet of the tuatara may be facilitated by its specialised shearing mechanism, which involves a forward movement of the lower jaw following jaw closure.

While birds, including raptors, wading birds and roadrunners, and mammals are known to prey on reptiles, the major predator is other reptiles. Some reptiles eat reptile eggs, for example the diet of the Nile monitor includes crocodile eggs, and small reptiles are preyed upon by larger ones.

== Conservation ==
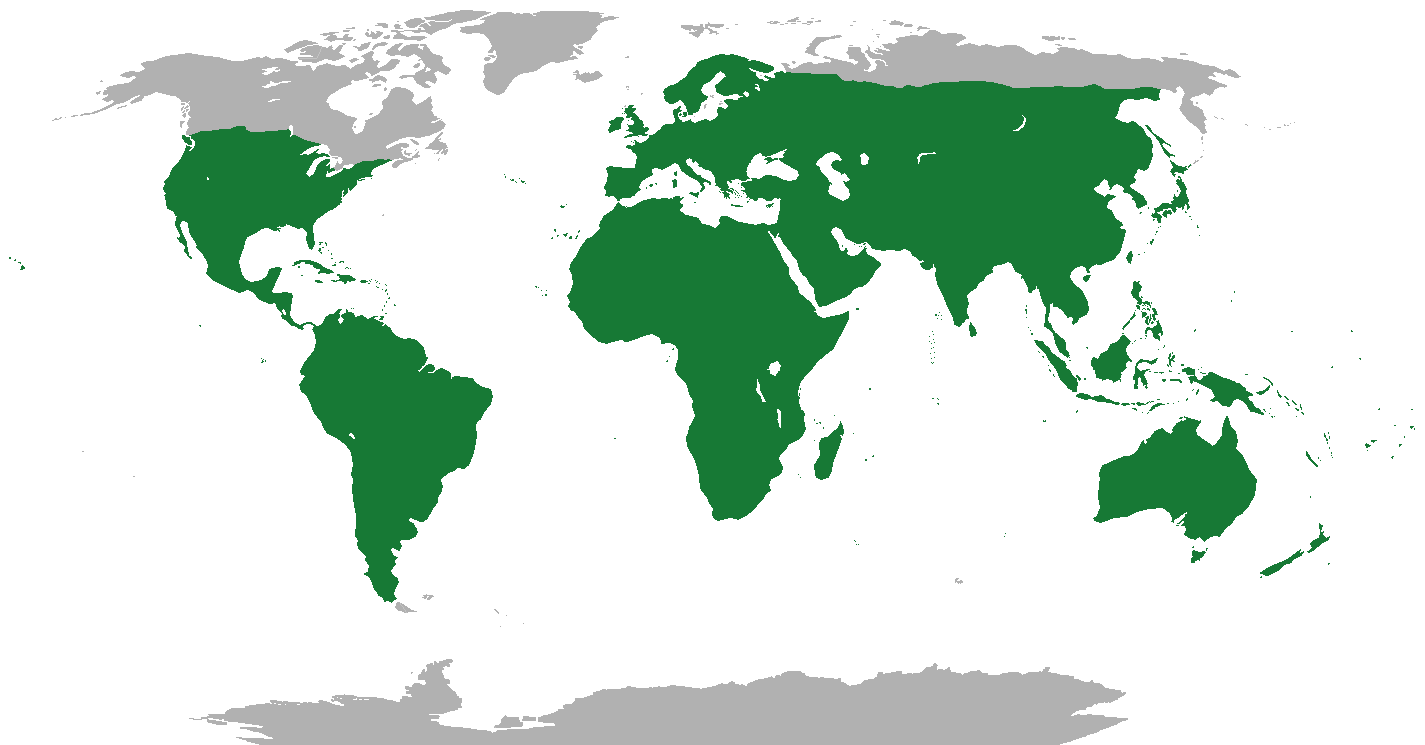
Global range of lizard species

The geographic ranges of lepidosaurs are vast and cover all but the most extreme cold parts of the globe. Amphisbaenians exist in Florida, mainland Mexico, including Baja California, the Mediterranean region, the Middle East, North Africa, sub-Saharan Africa, South America, and the Caribbean. The tuatara is confined to only a few rocky islands of New Zealand, where it digs burrows to live in and preys mostly on insects.

Climate change has led to the need for conservation efforts to protect the existence of the tuatara. This is because it is not possible for this species to migrate on its own to cooler areas. Conservationists are beginning to consider the possibility of translocating them to islands with cooler climates. The range of the tuatara has already been minimized by the introduction of cats, rats, dogs, and mustelids to New Zealand. The eradication of the mammals from the islands where the tuatara still survives has helped the species increase its population. An experiment observing the tuatara population after the removal of the Polynesian rat showed that the tuatara expressed an island-specific increase of population after the rats' removal. However, it may be difficult to keep these small mammals from reinhabiting these islands.

Habitat destruction is the leading negative impact of humans on reptiles. Humans continue to develop land that is important habitat for the lepidosaurs. The clear-cutting of land has also led to habitat reduction. Some snakes and lizards migrate toward human dwellings because there is an abundance of rodent and insect prey. However, these reptiles are seen as pests and are often exterminated.

=== Interactions with humans ===
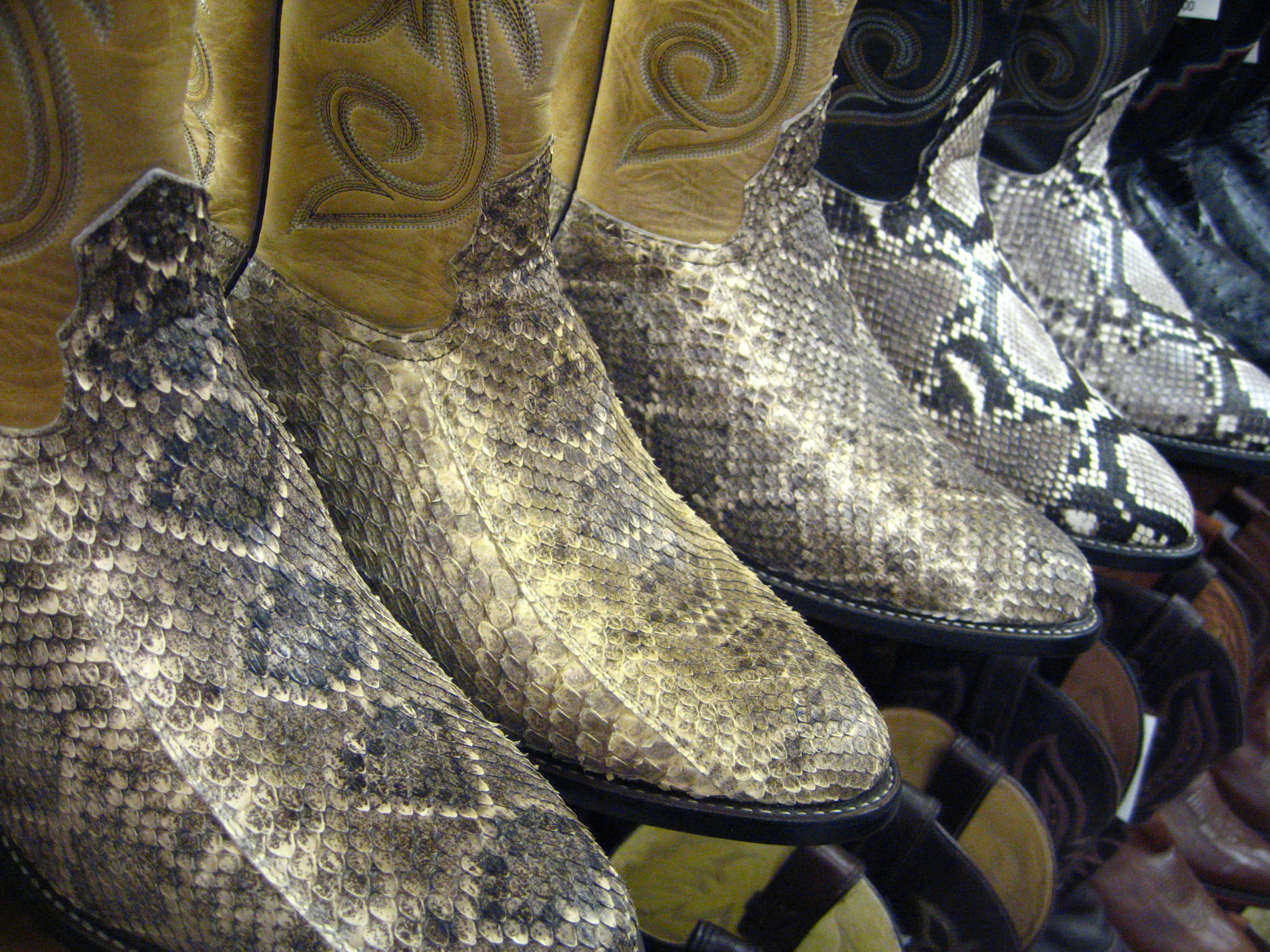
Boots made from snake skin, the three closest from diamondback rattlesnakes

Snakes are commonly feared throughout the world. Bounties were paid for dead cobras under the British Raj in India; similarly, there have been advertised rattlesnake roundups in North America. Data shows that between 1959 and 1986 an average of 5,563 rattlesnakes were killed per year in Sweetwater, Texas, due to rattlesnake roundups, and these roundups have led to documented declines and local extirpations of rattlesnake populations, especially Eastern Diamondbacks in Georgia.

People have introduced species to the lepidosaurs' natural habitats that have increased predation on the reptiles. For example, mongooses were introduced to Jamaica from India to control the rat infestation in sugar cane fields. As a result, the mongooses fed on the lizard population of Jamaica, which has led to the elimination or decrease of many lizard species. Actions can be taken by humans to help endangered reptiles. Some species are unable to be bred in captivity, but others have thrived. There is also the option of animal refuges. This concept is helpful to contain the reptiles and keep them from human dwellings. However, environmental fluctuations and predatorial attacks still occur in refuges.

Reptile skins are still being sold. Accessories, such as shoes, boots, purses, belts, buttons, wallets, and lamp shades, are all made out of reptile skin. In 1986, the World Resource Institute estimated that 10.5 million reptile skins were traded legally. This total does not include the illegal trades of that year. Horned lizards are popularly harvested and stuffed. Some humans are making a conscious effort to preserve the remaining species of reptiles, however.
