= Pleurodont =

Various squamate jaws viewed from the inside, showing pleurodonty

Pleurodont is a form of tooth implantation common in reptiles of the order Squamata, as well as in at least one temnospondyl. The vestibular (outer) side of pleurodont teeth are fused (ankylosed) to the inner surface of the jaw bones which host them. The lingual (tongue) side of pleurodont teeth are not attached to bone, and instead are typically held in place by connective ligaments. This contrasts with thecodont implantation, in which the teeth are set in sockets and surrounded by bone on all sides.
