= Sgurr of Eigg Pitchstone Formation =

Geologic formation in Scotland

- Stratigraphic range: 58.72 ± 0.07 Ma
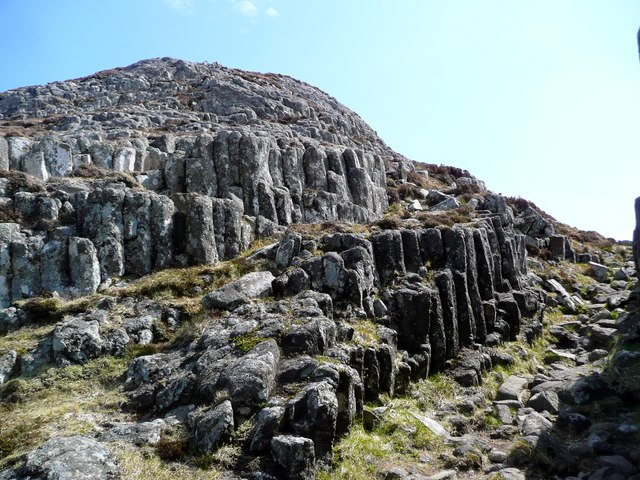
- Columnar pitchstone on An Sgurr
- Type: Geological formation
- Overlies: Eigg Lava Formation
- Thickness: up to 120 metres (390 ft)

Lithology
- Primary: Pitchstone
- Other: Peperite

Location
- Region: Inner Hebrides
- Country: Scotland

Type section
- Named for: Sgurr of Eigg

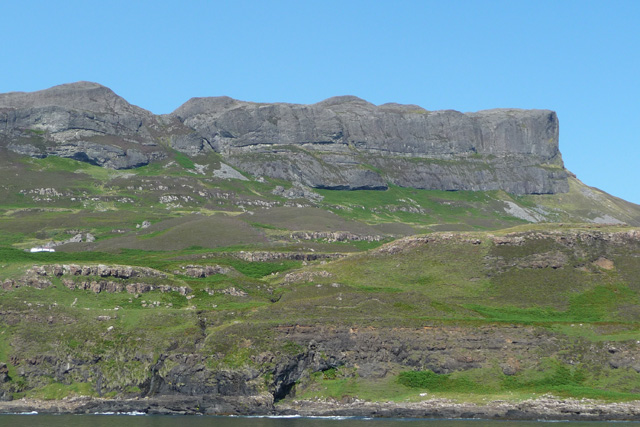
The ridge formed by the pitchstone, viewed from the south

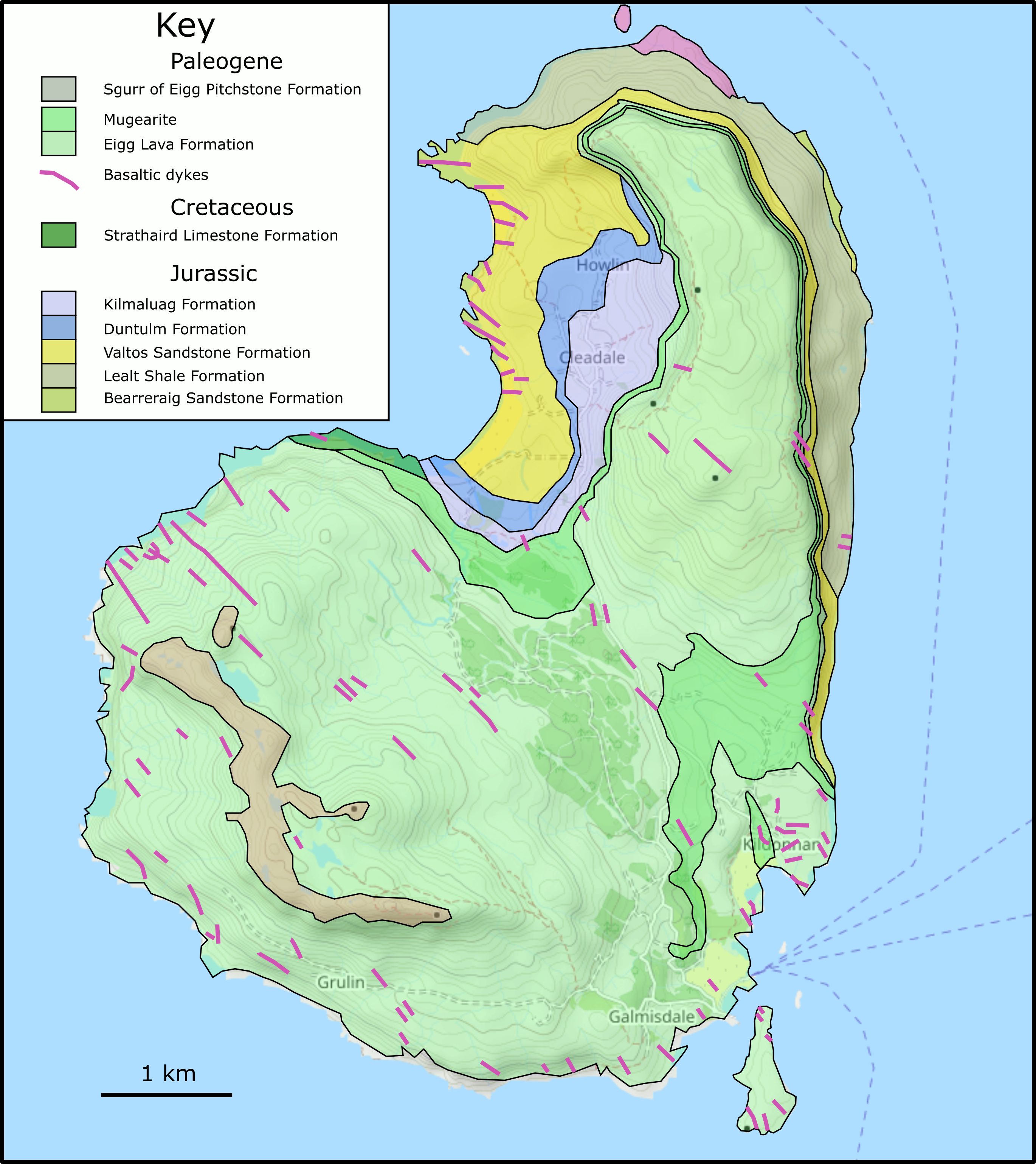
Geological map of Eigg, showing location of the pitchstone

The Sgurr of Eigg Pitchstone Formation is a volcanic formation of late Paleocene age exposed on Eigg, part of the Inner Hebrides in Scotland. It is thought to represent a remnant of a much larger deposit that originated from the Skye igneous centre to the northeast, formed by an eruption, possibly with a VEI of 6 or greater.

== Extent ==
Due to its resistance to erosion, the Sgurr of Eigg Pitchstone Formation forms a prominent 3 km long ridge in the southwestern part of Eigg, with the peak of An Sgùrr at the eastern end and Bidean Boidheach at the western end. The pitchstone is preserved within a paleovalley eroded down into the underlying olivine basalts of the Eigg Lava Formation. It has been correlated with a similar pitchstone that outcrops on Òigh-Sgeir, a group of rocky islets 30 km west-northwest of Eigg.

== Lithology ==
The formation is described as a pitchstone. In the TAS classification scheme samples from the formation plot mostly within the trachydacite field. In the QAPF classification this is the equivalent to a rhyolite. There is a basal unit of breccia that is interpreted as a peperite. At three localities the pitchstone lies above significant thicknesses of conglomerate. These coarse, poorly sorted rocks are interpreted as an earlier valley-fill, emplaced as debris flows.

== Emplacement ==
First interpreted by Archibald Geikie as a lava filling a paleovalley, it was later interpreted as an intrusion by Alfred Harker. All subsequent workers, however, have supported Geikie's valley fill model. Multiple emplacement units have been recognised. The lack of evidence of significant subaerial exposure at the unit boundaries, as there are no sediments or evidence of weathering/paleosols at these levels, suggests that the formation is the result of a single eruption. The presence of shear folding throughout the sequence and other features associated with rheomorphism, supports interpretation of this formation as a rheomorphic lava-like ignimbrite.

== Source ==
The source for this unit is considered likely to be either the igneous centre on Skye to the north or the one on Rum to the northwest, as both of these centres have a significant component of silica-rich rocks. Comparisons of the chemistry and the radiometric ages argue strongly against Rum as the origin of this unit. However, granites that form part of the western Red Hills centre on Skye match closely in age and chemistry and this is thought to be the source for the pitchstone found both on Eigg and at Òigh-Sgeir.

== Eruption ==
Assuming that the pitchstone occurrences are related to the same single eruptive event, it is possible to estimate the size of eruption that formed them. A model in which the Eigg and Òigh-Sgeir pitchstones were deposited by two separate lobes, dividing either side of the Rum volcanic complex and using the maximum preserved thickness of 120 m, gives an estimate of 3.9 km^{3} dense-rock equivalent (DRE). Making reasonable assumptions about the extent of deposits outside the valley system, gives a range of in excess of 10–15 km^{3} DRE, the equivalent of an eruption of VEI 6 or more. Such an event would be the largest known silicic eruption in the British part of the North Atlantic Igneous Province.
