= North Atlantic Igneous Province =

Large igneous province in the North Atlantic, centered on Iceland

The North Atlantic Igneous Province (NAIP) is a large igneous province in the North Atlantic, centered on Iceland. In the Paleogene, the province formed the Thulean Plateau, a large basaltic lava plain, which extended over at least 1.3 million km^{2} (500 thousand mi^{2}) in area and 6.6 million km^{3} (1.6 million mi^{3}) in volume. The plateau was broken up during the opening of the North Atlantic Ocean leaving remnants preserved in north Ireland, west Scotland, the Faroe Islands, northwest Iceland, east Greenland, western Norway and many of the islands located in the north eastern portion of the North Atlantic Ocean. The igneous province is the origin of the Giant's Causeway and Fingal's Cave. The province is also known as Brito–Arctic province (also known as the North Atlantic Tertiary Volcanic Province) and the portion of the province in the British Isles is also called the British Tertiary Volcanic Province or British Tertiary Igneous Province.

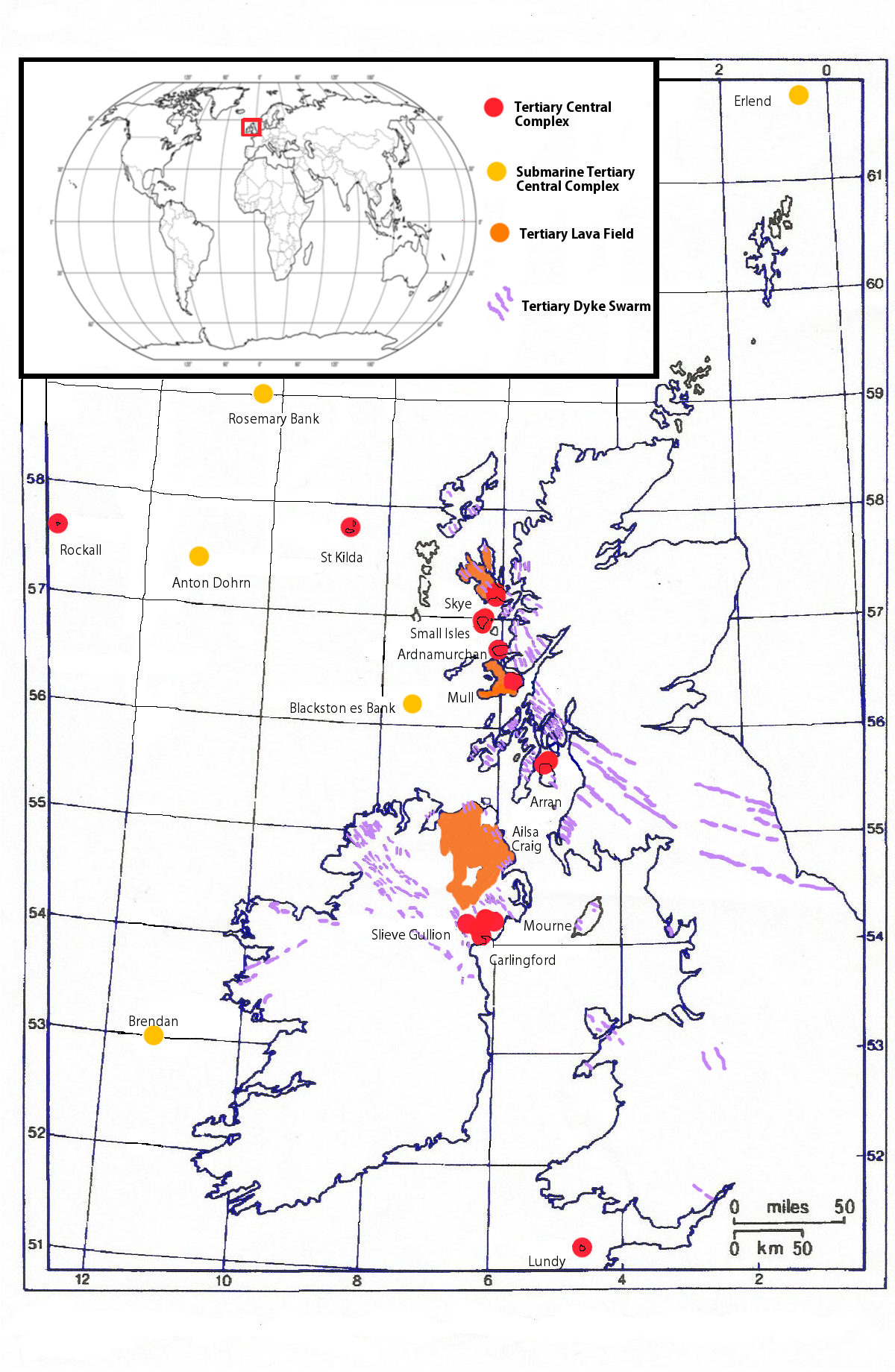
The British Tertiary Volcanic Province (based on Emeleus & Gyopari 1992 and Mussett et al. 1988) with UK map shown in context of the world map

== Formation ==
Isotopic dating indicates the most active magmatic phase of the NAIP was between c. 60.5 and c. 54.5 Ma (million years ago) (mid-Paleocene to early Eocene) – further divided into Phase 1 (pre-break-up phase) dated to c. 62–58 Ma and Phase 2 (syn-break-up phase) dated to c. 56–54 Ma.

Continuing research also indicates that tectonic plate movement (of the Eurasian, Greenland, and North American plates), regional rifting events, and seafloor spreading between Labrador and Greenland may have begun as early as c. 95–80 Ma, c. 81 Ma, and c. 63–61 Ma respectively (late Cretaceous to early Paleocene).

Studies have suggested that the modern day Iceland hotspot corresponds to the earlier 'North Atlantic mantle plume' that would have created the NAIP. Through both geochemical observations and reconstructions of paleogeography, it is speculated that the present day Iceland hotspot originated as a mantle plume on the Alpha Ridge (Arctic Ocean) c. 130–120 Ma, migrated down Ellesmere Island, through Baffin Island, onto the west coast of Greenland, and finally arrived on the east coast of Greenland by c. 60 Ma.

Extensive outpourings of lava occurred, particularly in East Greenland, which during the Paleogene was then adjacent to Britain. Little is known of the geodynamics of the opening of the North Atlantic between Greenland and Europe.

As the Earth's crust was stretched above the mantle hotspot under stress from plate rifting, fissures opened up along a line from Ireland to the Hebrides and plutonic complexes were formed. Hot magma over 1000 °C surfaced as multiple, successive and extensive lava flows covered over the original landscape, burning forests, filling river valleys, burying hills, to eventually form the Thulean Plateau, which contained various volcanic landforms such as lava fields and volcanoes. There was more than one period of volcanic activity during the NAIP, in between which sea levels rose and fell and erosion took place.

Volcanic activity would have started with volcaniclastic accumulations, like volcanic ash, quickly followed by vast outpourings of highly fluid basaltic lava during successive eruptions through multiple volcanic vents or in linear fissures. As mafic low viscosity lava reached the surface it rapidly cooled and solidified, successive flows built up layer upon layer, each time filling and covering existing landscapes. Hyaloclastites and pillow lavas were formed when the lava flowed into lakes, rivers and seas. Magma that did not make it to the surface as flows froze in conduits as dikes and volcanic plugs and large amounts spread laterally to form sills. Dike swarms extended across the British Isles throughout the Cenozoic. Individual central complexes developed with arcuate intrusions (cone sheets, ring dikes and stocks), the intrusions of one centre cut through earlier centres recording magmatic activity with time. During intermittent periods of erosion and change in sea levels, heated waters circulated through the flows altering the basalts and deposited distinctive suites of zeolite minerals.

Activity of the NAIP 55 million years ago may have caused the Paleocene–Eocene Thermal Maximum, where a large amount of carbon was released into the atmosphere and the Earth substantially warmed. One hypothesis is that the uplift caused by the NAIP hotspot caused methane clathrates to dissociate and dump 2000 gigatons of carbon into the atmosphere.

== Igneous landforms ==
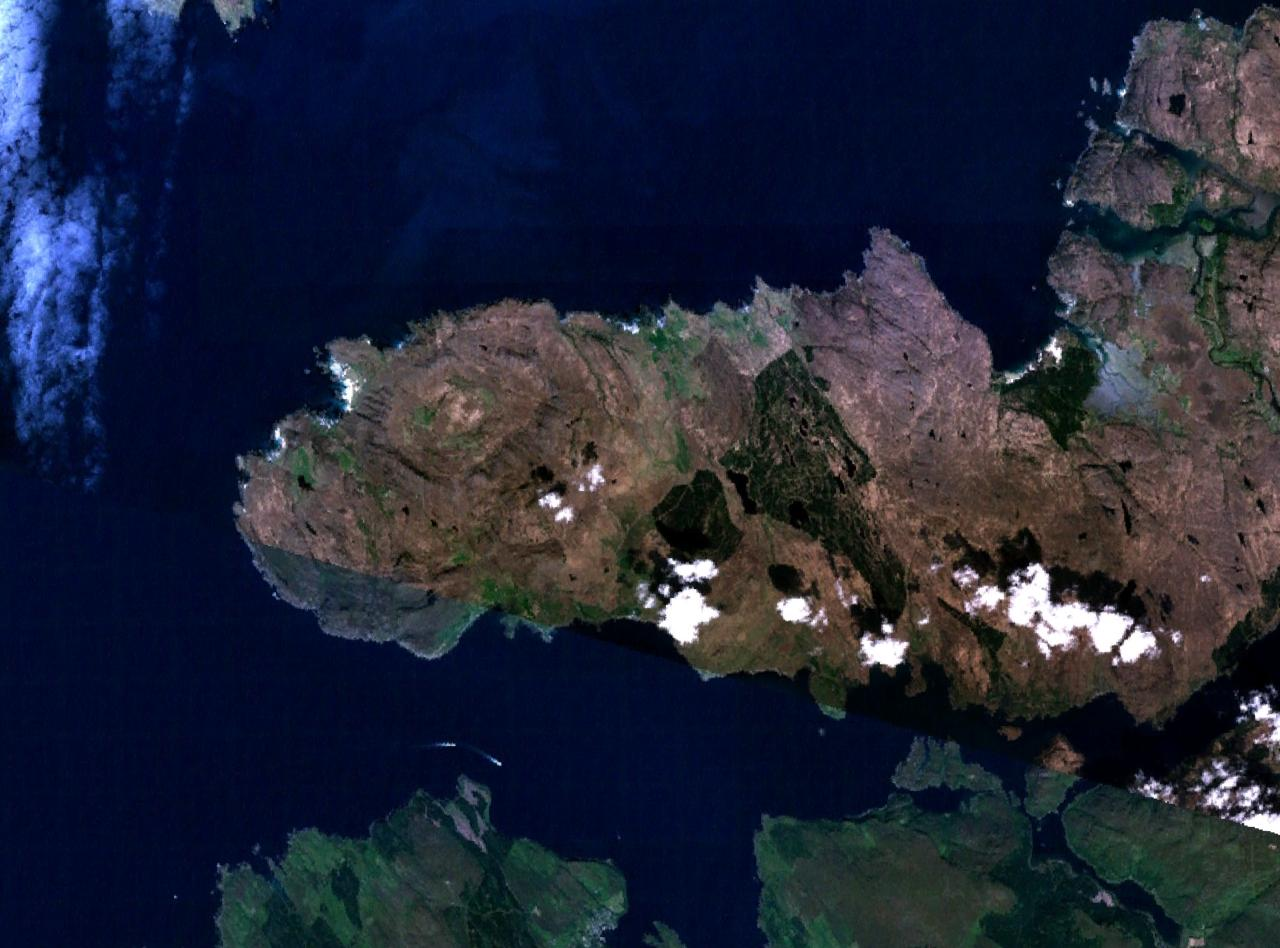
Satellite photo of Ardnamurchan – with clearly visible circular shape, which is the 'plumbings of an ancient volcano'

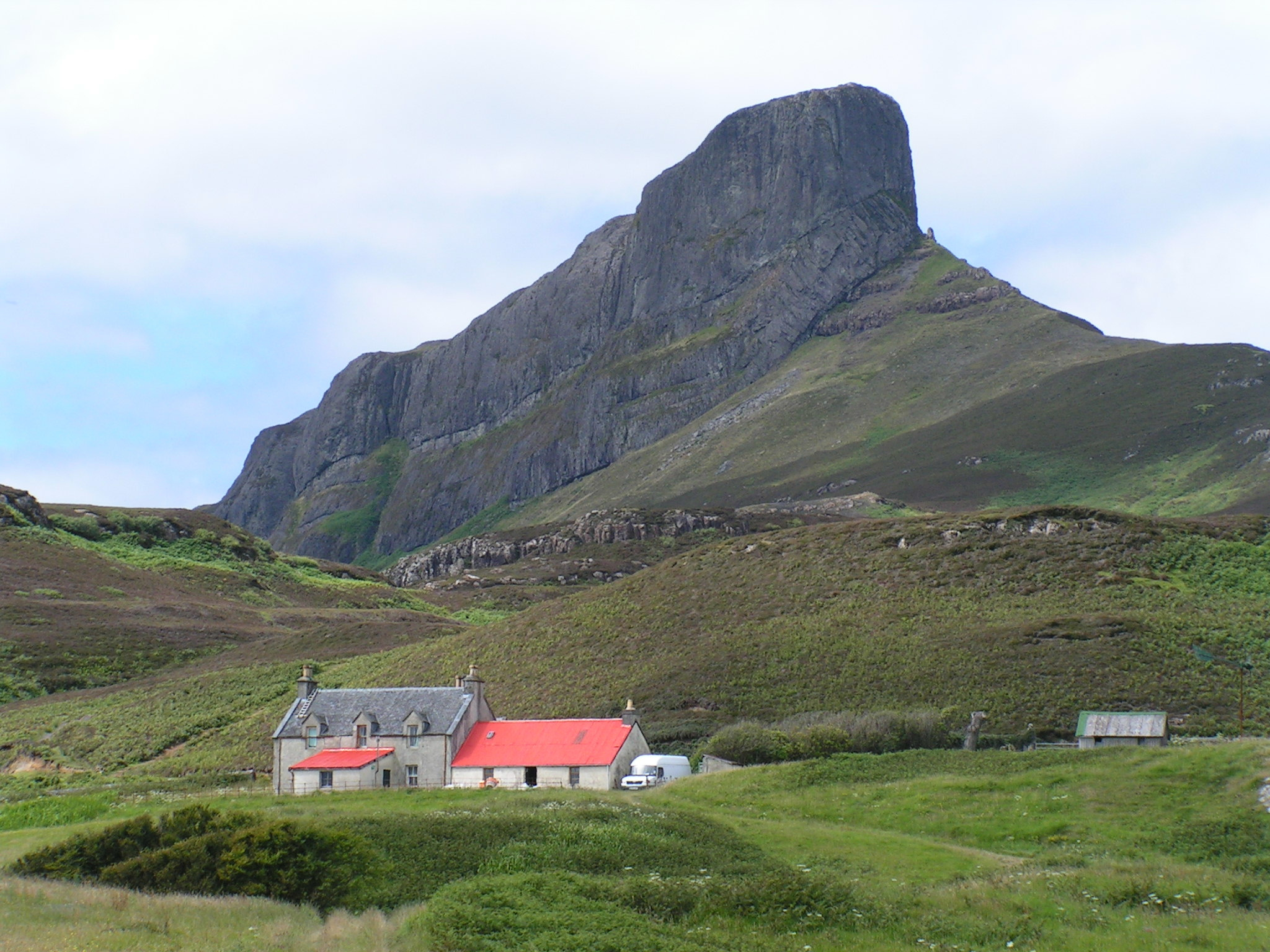
An Sgurr, Eigg – largest exposed piece of pitchstone in the UK

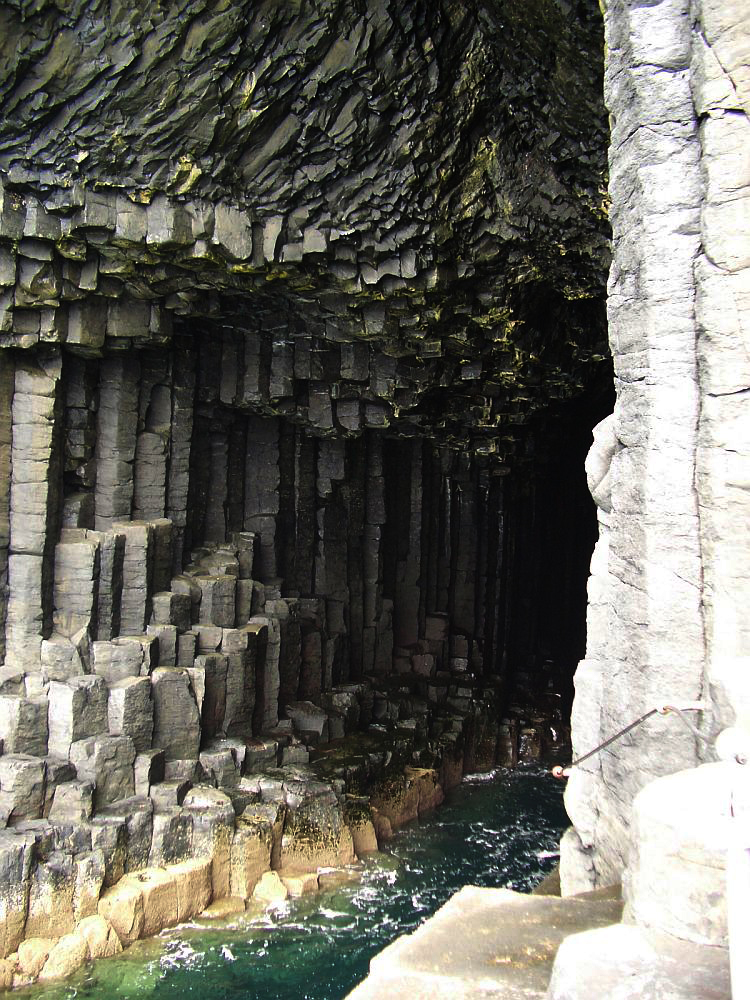
Basalt columns inside Fingal's Cave

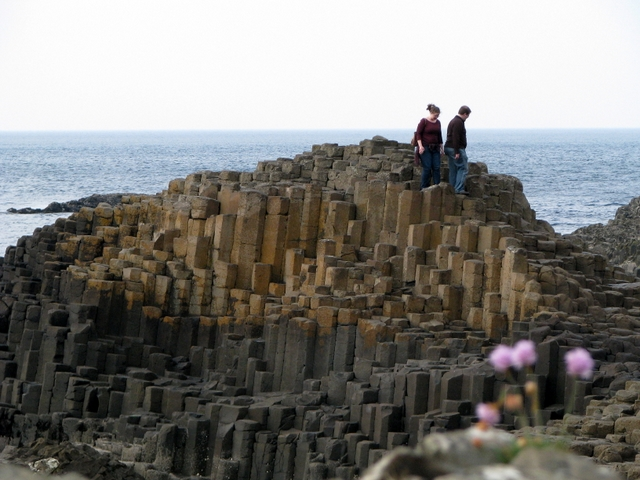
Giant's Causeway – polygonal basalt pavement

The NAIP is made up of both onshore and offshore basalt floods, sills, dykes, and plateaus. Dependent upon various regional locations, the NAIP is made up of MORB (Mid Ocean Ridge Basalt), alkali basalt, tholeiitic basalt, and picrite basalt.

Basaltic volcanic rocks up to 2.5 kilometres (1.6 mi) thick cover 65,000 square kilometres (25,000 mi^{2}) in east Greenland. Numerous intrusions related to hot-spot magmatism are exposed in the coastal region of east Greenland. The intrusions show a wide range of compositions. The Skaergaard intrusion (Early Cenozoic or about 55 million year age) is a layered gabbro (mafic) intrusion that has mineralized rock units enriched in palladium and gold. In contrast, the Werner Bjerge complex is made up of potassium- and sodium-rich (alkaline) granitic rock, containing molybdenum.

Locations of submarine central complexes within the NAIP include:

- Anton Dohrn Seamount
- Rosemary Bank
- Blackstones Bank
- Brendan
- Erlend

=== United Kingdom ===
The British portion of the NAIP, particularly West Scotland, provides relatively easy access, compared to the largely inaccessible basalt fields of West Greenland, to deeply eroded relics of the central volcanic complexes.

Locations of major intrusion complexes within the British part of the NAIP include:

- Lundy Island
- Mourne Mountains
- Slieve Gullion – Ring of Gullion AONB
- Arran
- Mull
- Ardnamurchan
- Rùm
- Eigg
- Skye
- St Kilda
- Rockall

Those occurrences within the Hebrides are sometimes referred to as the Hebridean Igneous Province.

Other notable NAIP landform locations in the United Kingdom include:

- Giant's Causeway – Polygonal basalt columns, which seen from above are large hexagonal pavements
- Canna and Sanday – Basalt lava field with great thicknesses of boulder conglomerate, examples of periods of erosion by fast flowing rivers in between the lava flows.
- Rathlin Island – Paleogene and Neogene lava flows
- Fingal's Cave on the Isle of Staffa – Polygonal basalt columns eroded to form a cave
- Ailsa Craig – Volcanic plug
- Cleveland Dyke, North Yorkshire – Dyke swarm related to the Mull intrusive complex
- The dike complexes of the NAIP contain many examples of dolerite dike swarms found throughout the British Isles.

=== Republic of Ireland ===
Carlingford, County Louth is the only location of a major intrusion complex within the Republic of Ireland's part of the NAIP.

== History of geological studies ==
The intensity of scientific investigation within the NAIP has made it one of the most historically important and deeply studied igneous provinces in the world. Basalt petrology was born in the Scottish Hebrides in 1903 led by the eminent British geologist Sir Archibald Geikie. From the outset Geikie studied the geology of Skye and other Western Isles taking a keen interest in volcanic geology and in 1871 he presented the Geological Society of London with an outline of the 'Tertiary Volcanic History of Britain'. Following Geikie many have tried, and continue to study and understand the NAIP, and in doing so have advanced knowledge in geology, mineralogy and in more recent decades geochemistry and geophysics.

== See also ==
- Igneous rock
- Geologic province
- Mantle plume
- Hotspot
- Oceanic plateau
- Continental flood basalt
- Large igneous province
- Dike swarm
