= Eilean Chathastail =

Island in Scotland

Eilean Chathastail (Gaelic)
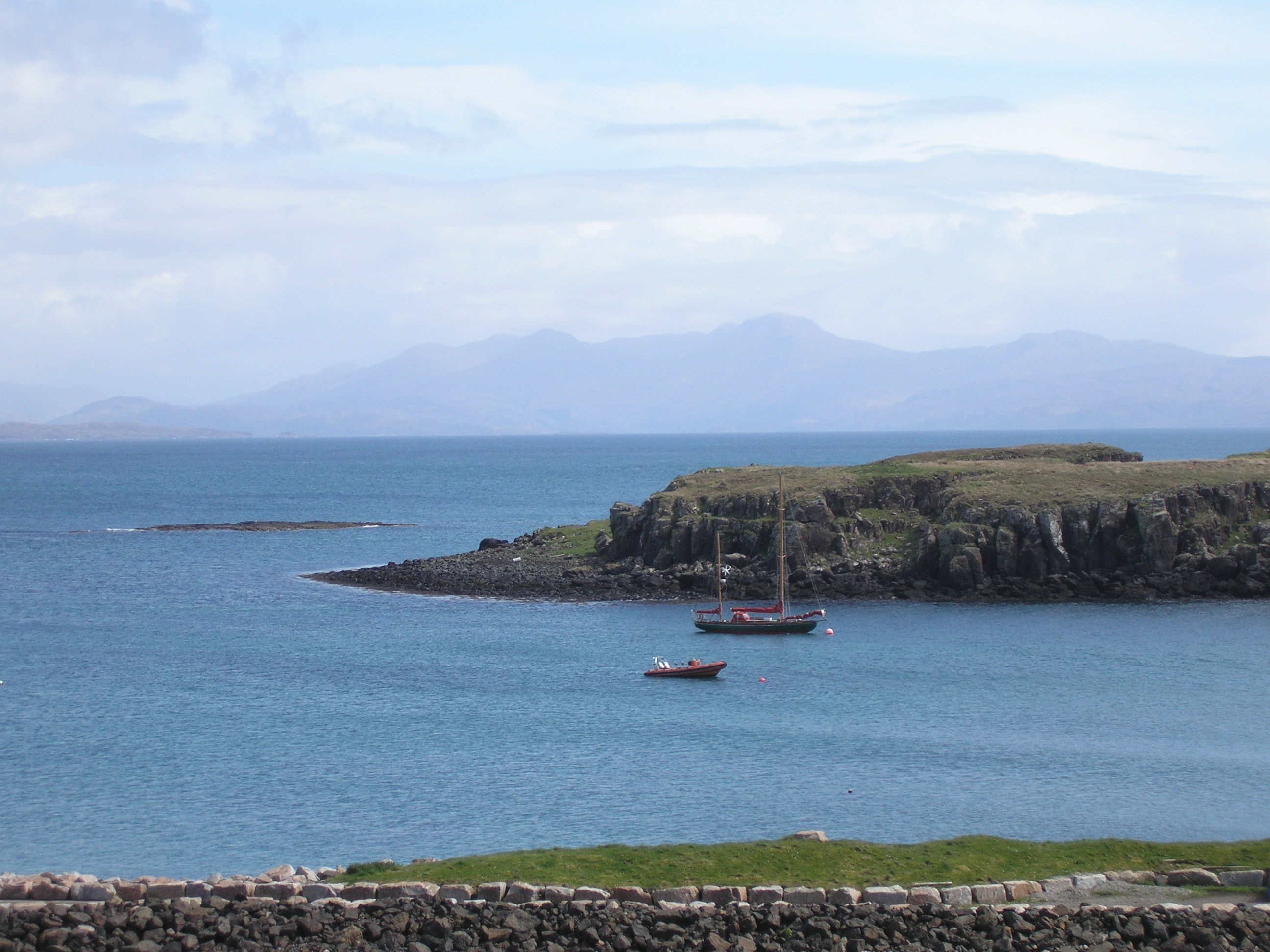
- The north end of Eilean Chathastail from Eigg

Location
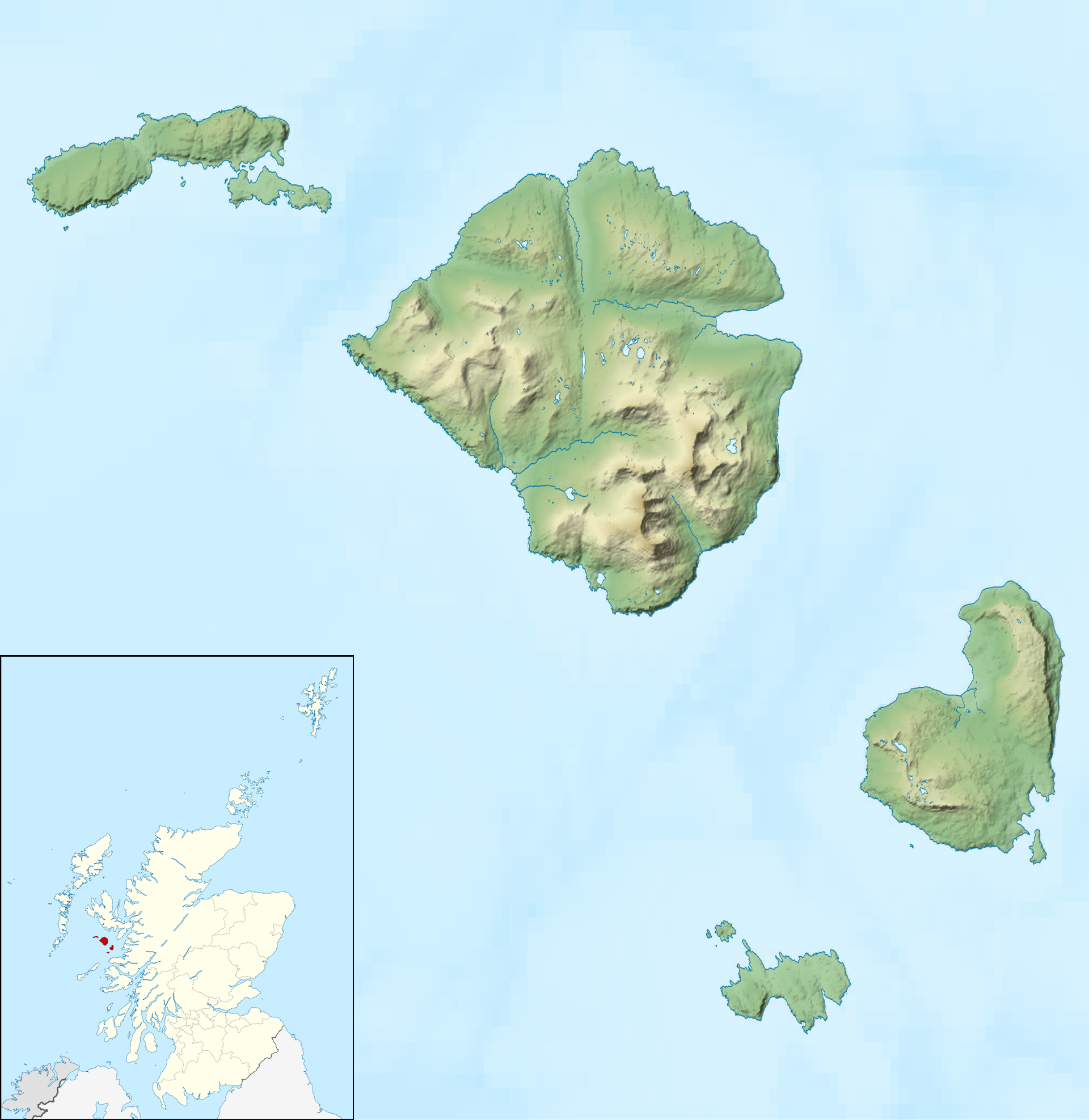
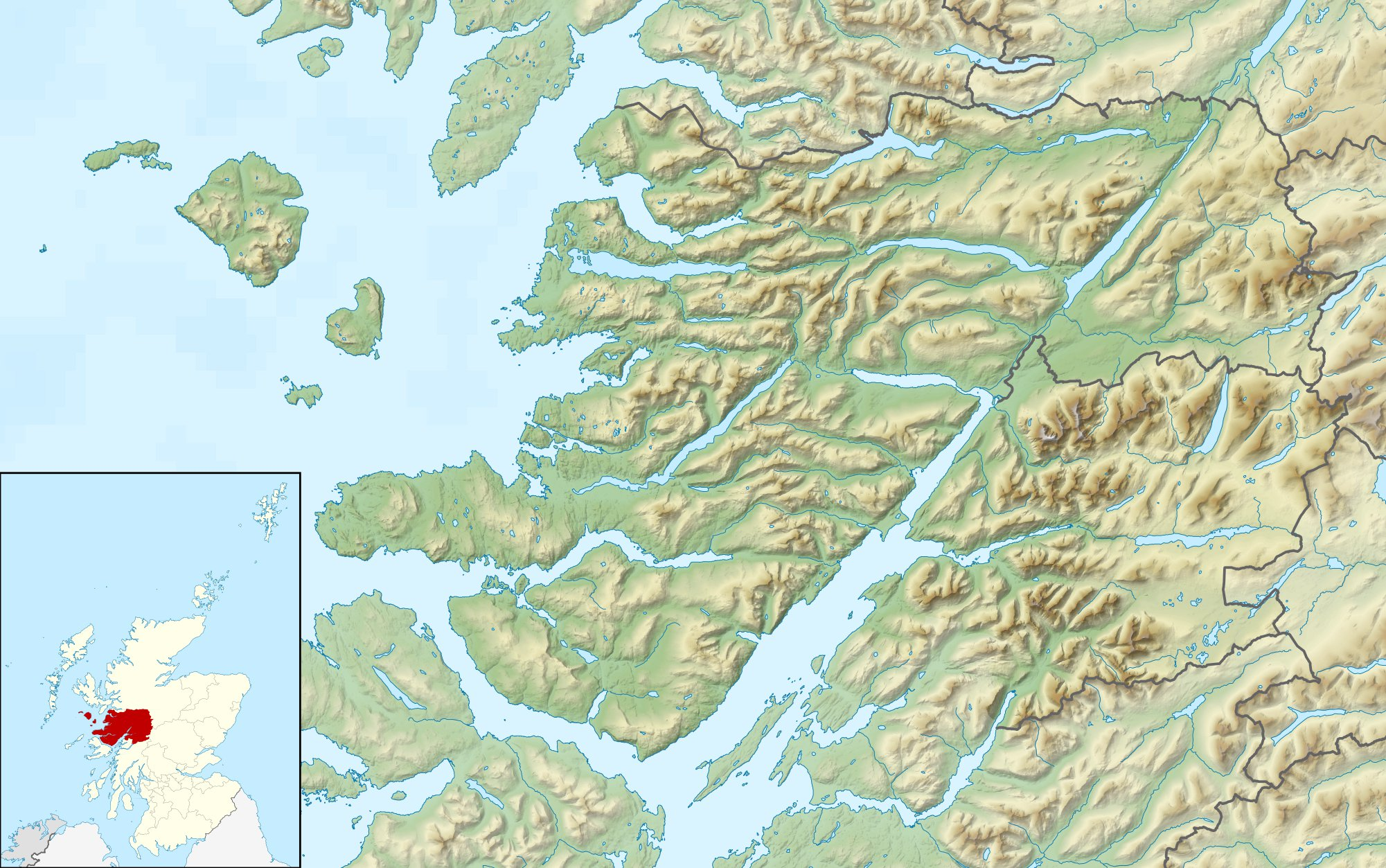
- Eilean Chathastail shown within the Small Isles Eilean Chathastail shown within Lochaber
- OS grid reference: NM485835
- Coordinates: 56.875°N 6.129°W

Physical geography
- Island group: Small Isles
- Area: 25 hectares (0.1 sq mi)
- Highest elevation: 35 metres (115 ft)

Administration
- Council area: Highland
- Country: Scotland
- Sovereign state: United Kingdom

Demographics
- Population: 0

Eilean Chathastail (Eng: Castle Island) is one of the Small Isles in the Inner Hebrides of Scotland.

== Geography ==
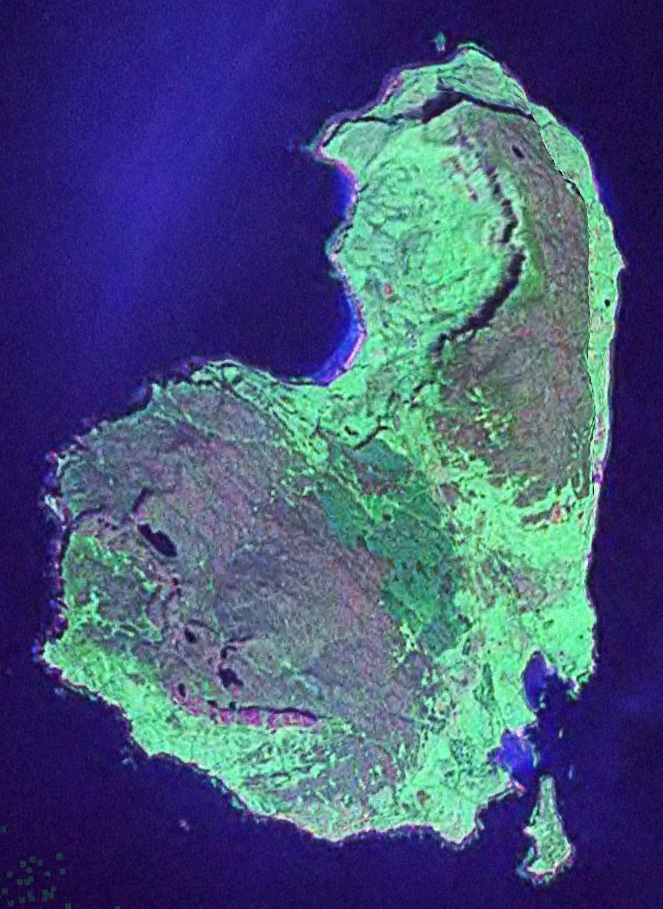
Satellite view of Eigg (Landsat image viewed using NASA World Wind software). Eilean Chathastail is the island in the bottom right of the picture

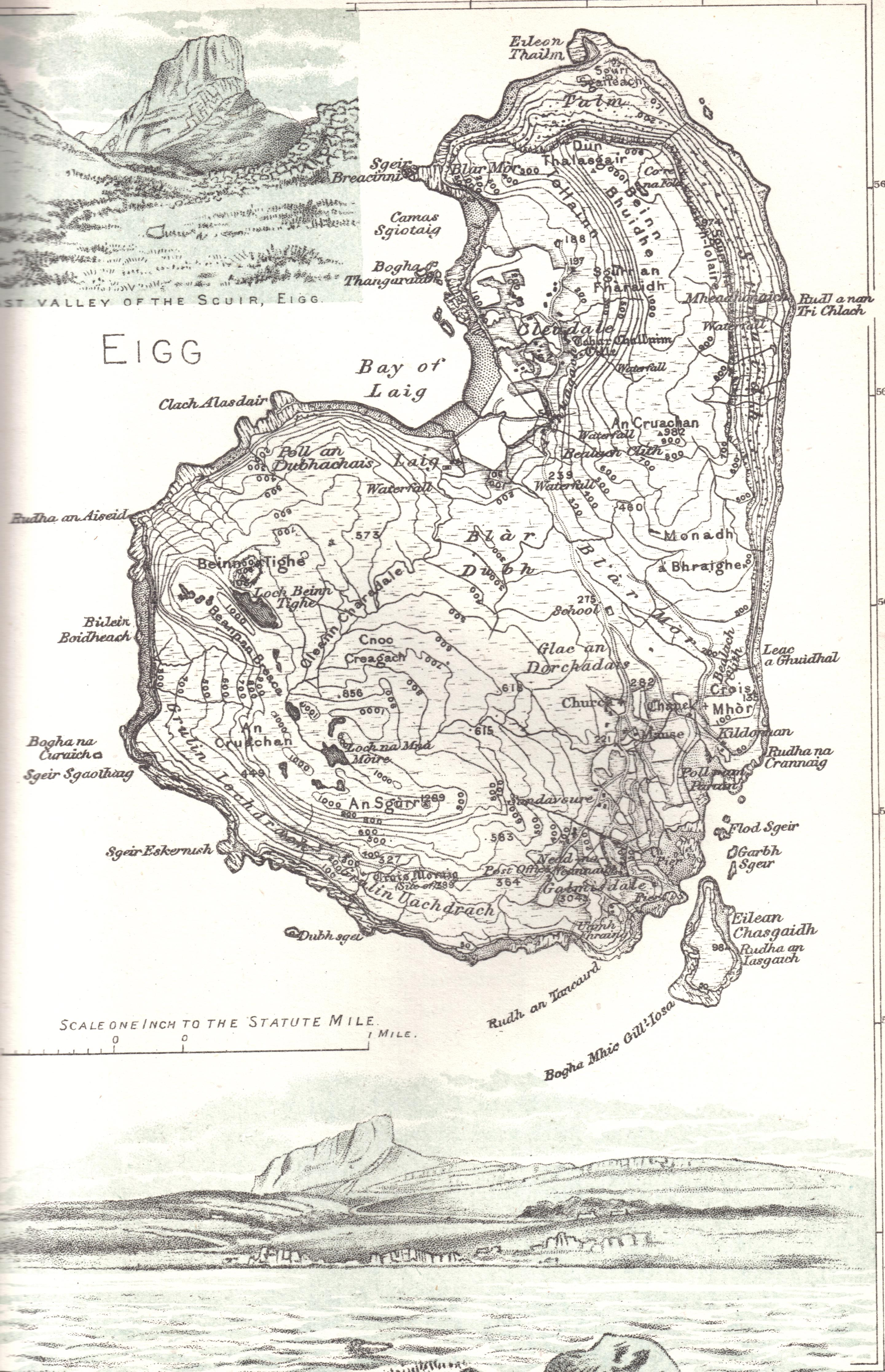
Map of Eigg 1892, with Eilean Chathastail to its Southeast

Eilean Chathastail protects the only harbour on Eigg at Galmisdale. It is roughly 1 kilometre (1,100 yd) in length and lies only 100 metres (110 yd) off the south-east coast of the island of Eigg. Eigg lighthouse was built on the island in 1906 by brothers David A. and Charles Alexander Stevenson.

== History ==
In July 1884 the geologist and writer Hugh Miller arrived at the Eilean Chathastail anchorage on board the yacht Betsey. He had just begun his journey at Tobermory and he produced a diary of his travels in the Hebrides for the newspaper Witness, of which he was the editor. His contributions were later collated and published as The Cruise of the Betsey in 1856.

He wrote that: "We passed the Isle of Muck, with its one low hill; saw the pyramidal mountains of Rum looming tall in the offing; and then, running along the Isle of Eigg, with its colossal Scuir rising between us and the sky, as if it were a piece of Babylonian wall, or the great wall of China, only vastly larger, set down on the ridge of a mountain, we entered the channel which separates the isle from one of its dependencies, Eilean Chathastail, and cast anchor in the tideway."

Robert Lawrie Thomson, a former laird of Eigg, is buried at the southern end of Eilean Chathastail. This is marked by a burial enclosure on Maol an Eilean, the island's highest point.

== See also ==
- List of islands of Scotland
