= Cleadale =

Coordinates: 56.920°N 6.149°W

Cleadale: Scottish Gaelic: Clèadail
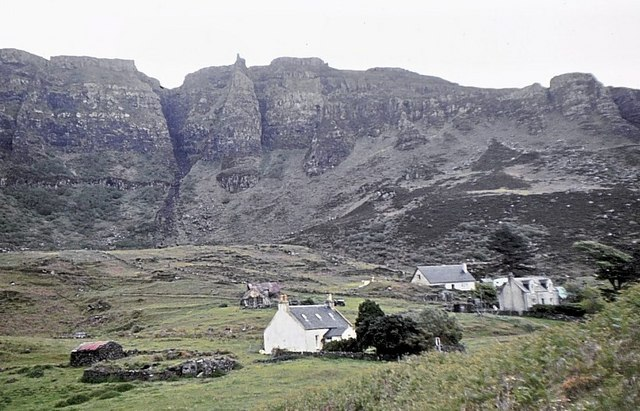
- Cottages at Cleadale

- Location within the Lochaber area
- OS grid reference: NM475885
- Council area: Highland
- Country: Scotland
- Sovereign state: United Kingdom
- Post town: ISLE OF EIGG
- Postcode district: PH42
- Police: Scotland
- Fire: Scottish
- Ambulance: Scottish
- UK Parliament: Inverness, Skye and West Ross-shire

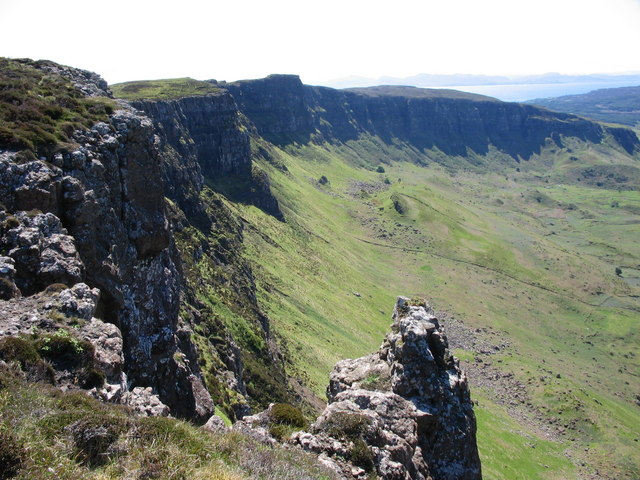
Cleadale from above

Cleadale (Scottish Gaelic: Clèadail) is a settlement on the north west side of the island of Eigg, in the Small Isles of Scotland and is in the council area of Highland. The setting is visually dramatic.
