= Eigg =

Island of Scotland

Eige (Gaelic)
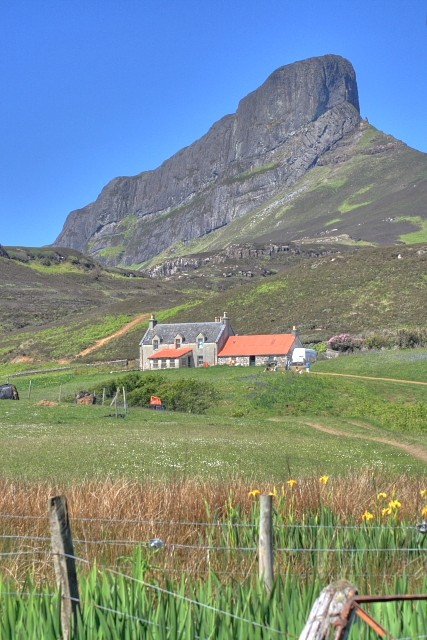
- An Sgùrr

Location
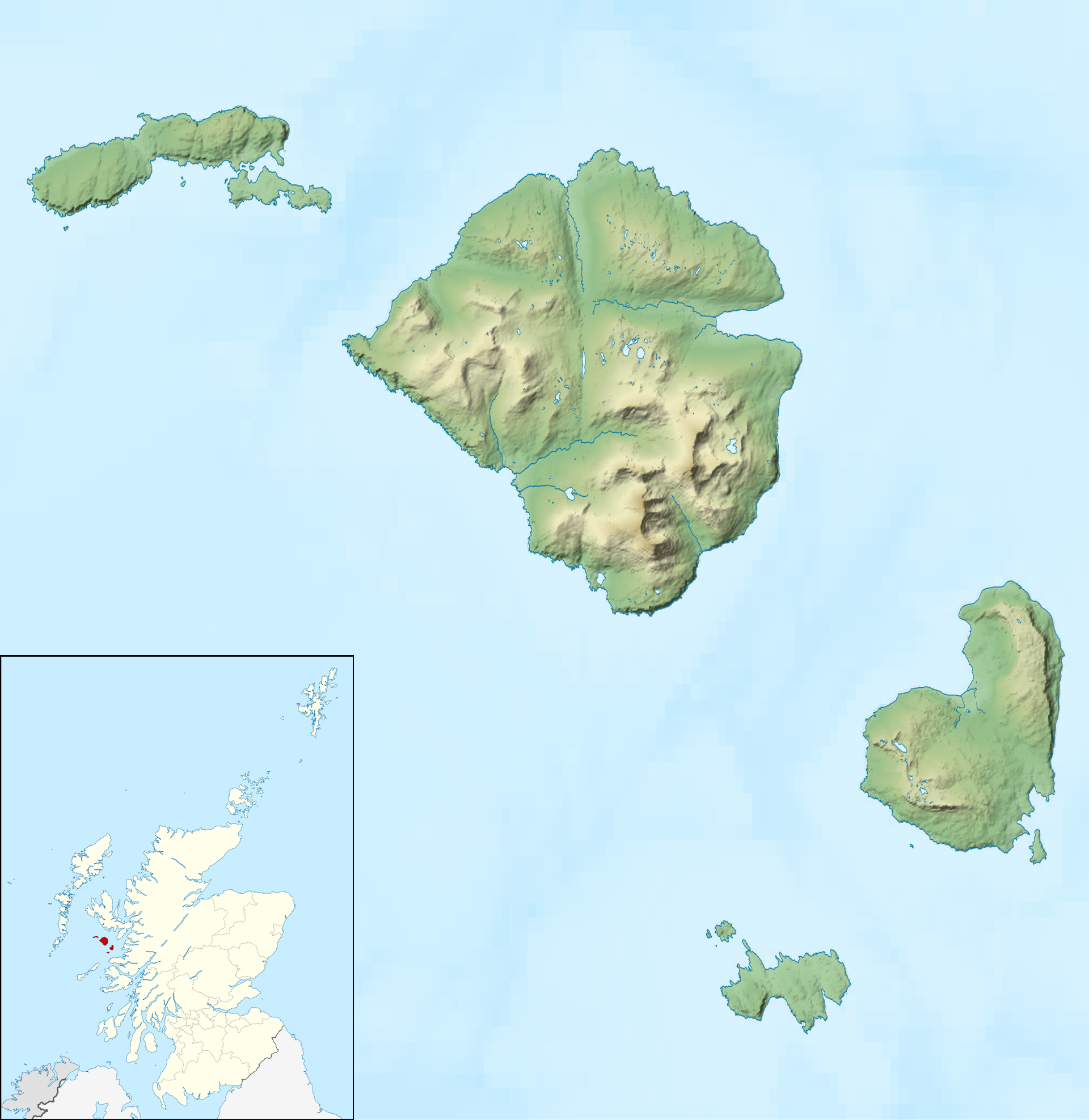
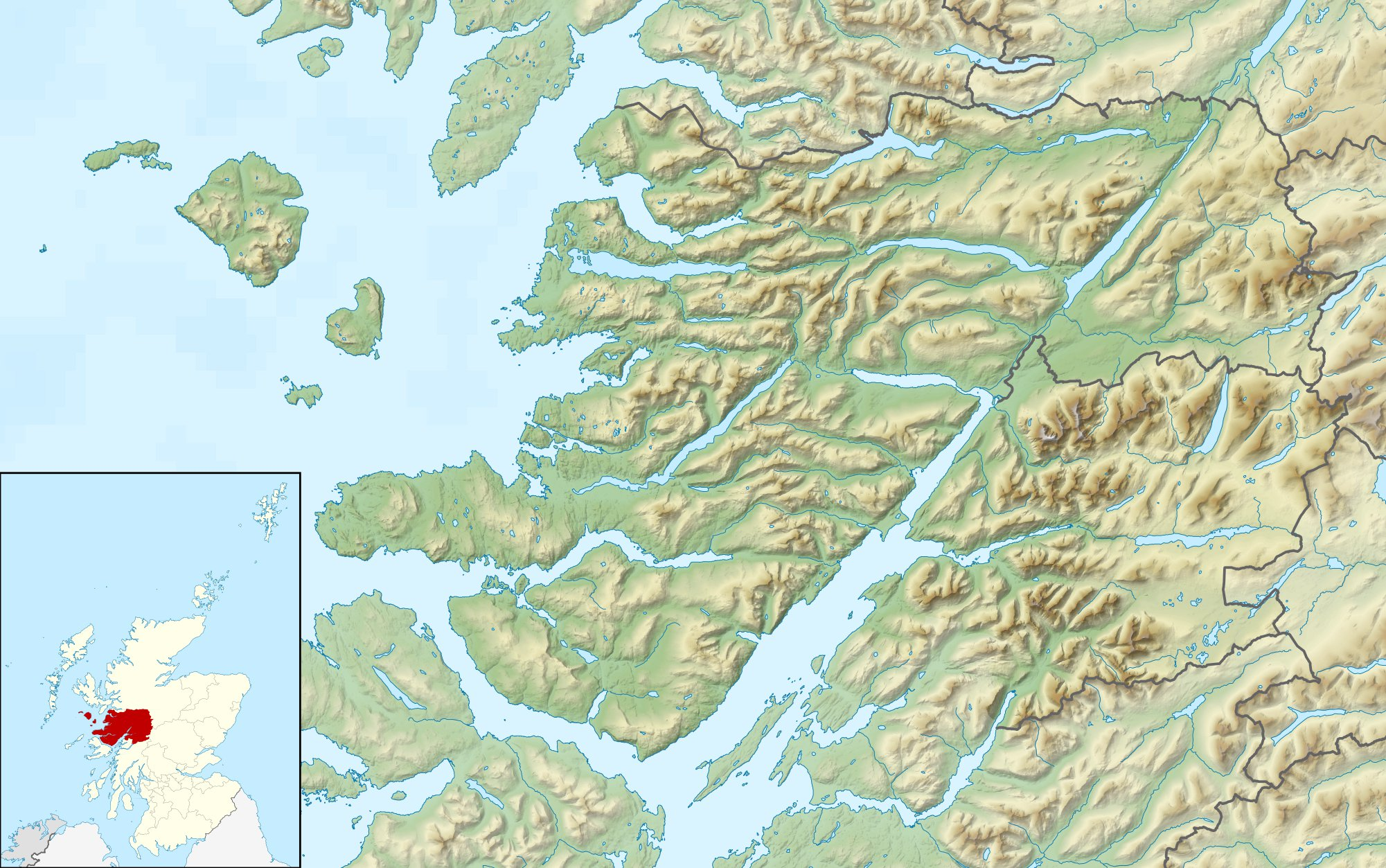
- Eigg shown within the Small Isles Eigg shown within Lochaber
- OS grid reference: NM476868
- Coordinates: 56.9°N 6.15°W

Name
- Gaelic pronunciation: English: /ɛɡ/ EG; Scottish Gaelic: [ˈekʲə]
- Name meaning: Scottish Gaelic for 'notched island' (eag)

Physical geography
- Island group: Small Isles
- Area: 3,049 ha (11.8 sq mi)
- Area rank: 28
- Highest elevation: An Sgùrr, 393 m (1,289 ft)

Administration
- Council area: Highland
- Country: Scotland
- Sovereign state: United Kingdom

Demographics
- Population: 95
- Population rank: 46=
- Population density: 23.1 people/km^{2}
- Largest settlement: Cleadale

Eigg (/ɛɡ/ EG; Scottish Gaelic: Eige [ˈekʲə]) is one of the Small Isles in the Scottish Inner Hebrides. It lies to the south of the island of Skye and to the north of the Ardnamurchan peninsula. Eigg is nine kilometres (5 1/2 miles) long from north to south, and five kilometres (three miles) east to west. With an area of just over 3,000 ha (11.6 sq mi) it is the second-largest of the Small Isles after Rùm. The highest eminence on Eigg is An Sgùrr, which is formed from the Sgurr of Eigg Pitchstone Formation, which erupted into a valley of older lavas during the Eocene epoch.

There are numerous archaeological sites dating from the prehistoric period of human occupation with the earliest written references relating to the Irish monk Donnán who arrived on Eigg around 600 AD. Commencing in the early 9th century, Norse settlers established the Kingdom of the Isles throughout the Hebrides. The 1266 Treaty of Perth transferred the territories of the Kingdom of the Isles to King Alexander III of Scotland. From the late 14th century, the island became a possession of Clanranald, during which time a notorious massacre took place during a period of clan warfare. After more than four centuries in Clanranald's hands, the island was sold during the 19th century, and the new laird evicted many of his tenants en masse and replaced them with herds of sheep.

There were then a series of owners until the island was purchased by the Isle of Eigg Heritage Trust in 1997. The trust is a form of community ownership and another stakeholder, the Scottish Wildlife Trust, manages the island as a nature reserve. Eigg now generates virtually all of its electricity using renewable energy. In April 2019, National Geographic discussed the island in an online article, estimating the average number of annual visitors at 10,000.

== Geology ==
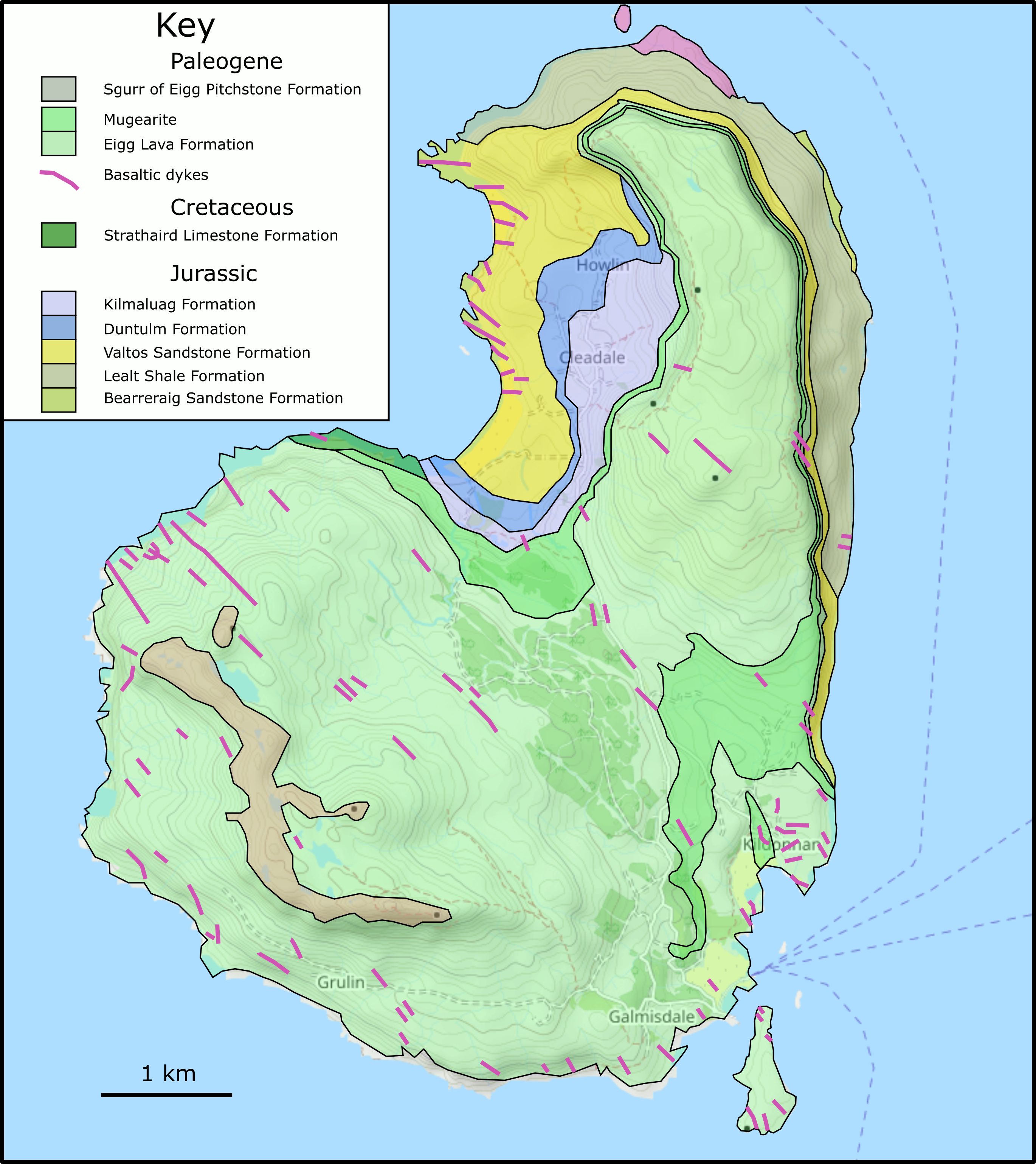
Geological map of Eigg

The larger part of the island is formed from olivine-phyric basalt flows erupted during the Palaeocene epoch. Together with flows of hawaiite and mugearite, these form the Eigg Lava Formation. The Sgùrr is formed from the Sgurr of Eigg Pitchstone Formation, a porphyritic rhyolitic pitchstone that erupted into a valley eroded into the older lavas during the Eocene epoch. It displays columnar jointing formed as the lava cooled.

In the north of the island are a series of sedimentary rocks of Middle Jurassic and Upper Cretaceous age. The oldest of these, and hence lowest from a stratigraphic perspective is the fossiliferous Bearreraig Sandstone which is calcareous in nature. It is overlain by the Lealt Shale which consists of a lower and an upper grey shale (respectively the Kildonnan and Lonfearn members) separated by a thin band of algal limestone. The shale is overlain by the thicker Valtos Sandstone which contains concretions. It is found along the east coast northwards from Poll nam Parlan and around the northern end and down the eastern side of the Bay of Laig. This in turn is overlain by the bivalve-rich limestone and shale of the Duntulm Formation and lastly the dark shales and ostracod-bearing limestones of the Kilmaluag Formation. A fossilised limb bone, considered most likely to be from a Middle Jurassic stegosaurian dinosaur, was discovered at a coastal exposed Valtos Sandstone Formation in 2020; it is the first confirmed dinosaur fossil to be found in Scotland away from the Isle of Skye. The Turonian (Upper Cretaceous) age Strathaird Limestone Formation is the youngest part of the Mesozoic sequence preserved beneath the unconformity at the base of the Eigg lavas and its found in a strip along the coast just west of the bay of Laig.

Both the igneous and the sedimentary rocks are cut through by a swarm of Palaeocene age dykes generally aligned NW-SE. A handful of faults are mapped on the same alignment, the two most significant ones stretching SE from Bay of Laig. A band of microsyenite stretches around the hillside southeast of the Sgùrr. Isolated pockets of peat of postglacial origin are to be found behind Bay of Laig whilst to its north are areas of hummocky moraine. Landslips occupy the whole coastal strip in the northeast of the island and the embayment behind Bay of Laig and effectively mask much of the outcrop of the Mesozoic sediments.

== Geography ==
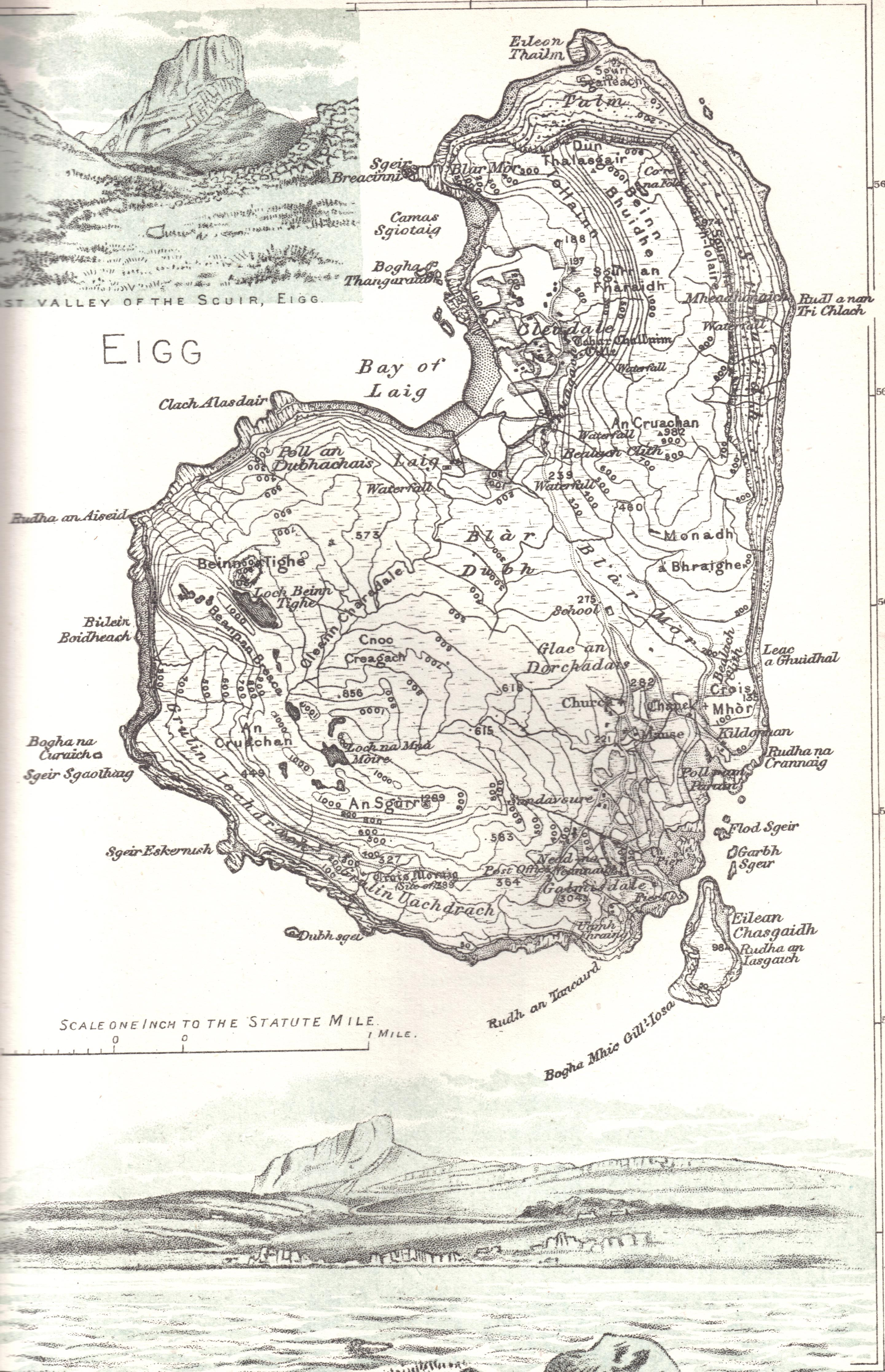
An 1892 map of Eigg.

Pronunciation
- Scots Gaelic: An Laimhrig
- Pronunciation: [əˈlˠ̪ajvɾʲɪkʲ]
- Scots Gaelic: Clèadail
- Pronunciation: [ˈkʰliət̪al]
- Scots Gaelic: Eige
- Pronunciation: [ˈekʲə]
- Scots Gaelic: Uamh Fhraing
- Pronunciation: [ˈuəv ˈɾaŋʲkʲ]

Eigg measures nine by five kilometres (5 1/2 by 3 miles) and is 21 kilometres (11 1/2 nautical miles) by sea from the nearest port of Mallaig. The centre of the island is a moorland plateau, rising to 393 m (1,289 ft) at An Sgùrr, a dramatic stump of pitchstone which is the "most memorable landmark in the Hebridean seas". Walkers who reach the top can, in good weather, take in views of Mull, Coll, Muck, the Outer Hebrides, Rùm, Skye, and the mountains of Lochaber on the mainland.

The plateau in the northern part of the island, at Beinn Buidhe, drops to a fertile coastal plain on its western side, containing Cleadale, the main settlement on Eigg. At the southern end of the plain, in the centre of the island, lies the bay of Laig, known for its quartz beach, called the "singing sands" on account of the squeaking noise it makes if walked on when dry. The first written description of this effect was penned by Hugh Miller in the 19th century:

I struck it obliquely with my foot, where the surface lay dry... [which] elicited a shrill sonorous note... I walked over it, striking it obliquely with each step and with every blow the shrill note was repeated.

The plateau is cleaved by a central valley, stretching from the vicinity of Laig, in the north, to Galmisdale at its southeastern end, which forms the main port. Beyond the southeast coast lies the small islet of Eilean Chathastail.

== Etymology ==
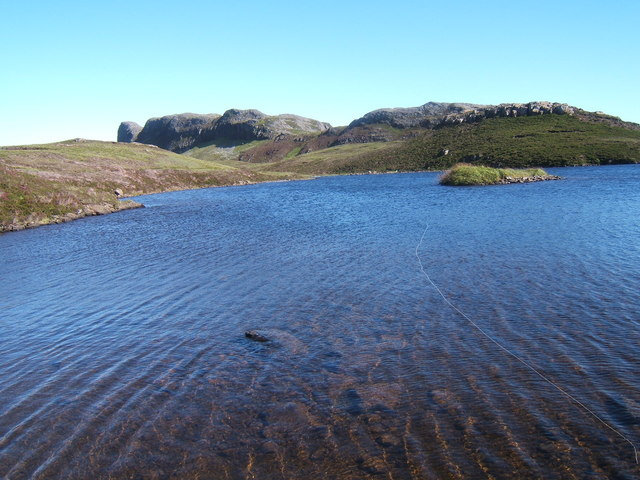
Loch nam Ban Mora

Adomnán calls the island Egea insula in his Vita Columbae (c. 700 AD). Other historical names have been Ega, and Ego. The Gaelic Eige means "notch" probably with reference to "the marked depression that runs across the middle of the island". A 2013 study also suggested a possible Norse origin. (Note: Broderick offers the Norse egg or eggjar, meaning "edge", although there is no evidence of Norse activity in the area until after Adomnan's time. Watson points out that there "is another Eilean Eige, much notched, off the coast of Arisaig". The Ravenna Cosmography, created around 700 AD is difficult to interpret. It has been suggested that "Sobrica" listed there could refer to Eigg, although there is clearly no linguistic connection between the names.)

Eigg was also known as Eilean nam Ban Móra - "the island of the great women". (Local tradition claims that the dun at Loch nam Ban Mora (see below) was once inhabited by unusually large women.) Martin Martin reported in 1703 that "the natives dare not call this isle by its ordinary name of Egg when they are at sea, but island Nim-Ban-More."

Some of the island settlement names are of Norse origin. Cleadale (Clèadail) may mean "valley of the ridged slope". The first element of Galmisdale is possibly a personal name. Laig may derive from "muddy bay". Grulin is of Gaelic origin, Scottish Gaelic: Grùlainn meaning "stony land".

== History ==
=== Early history ===
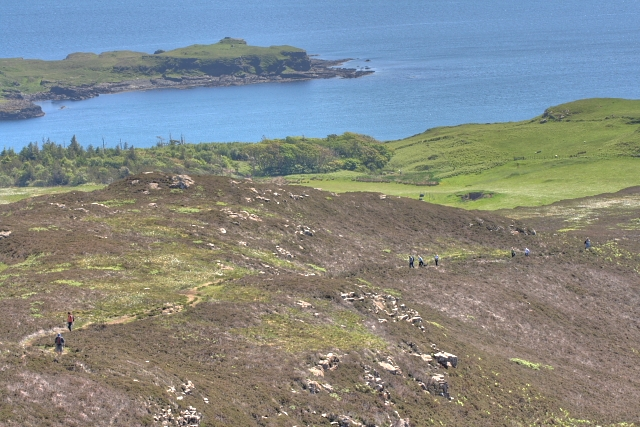
Slope down to Galmisdale near the metalworking site

At Rubh' An Tangaird, near Glamisdale on the southern coast, there are the remains of an oval house, with thick walls, and an upright stone at each side of the doorway. There are comparable structures in Shetland such as at Scord of Brouster, which suggests a Neolithic date.

Evidence for the island having been occupied in the Bronze Age includes two axes and a cache of flints, one of them being thumbnail scraper found near Galmisdale, together with significant metalworking debris. A barbed-and-tanged flint arrowhead of uncertain date was found to the south of Kildonnan.

=== Iron Age ===
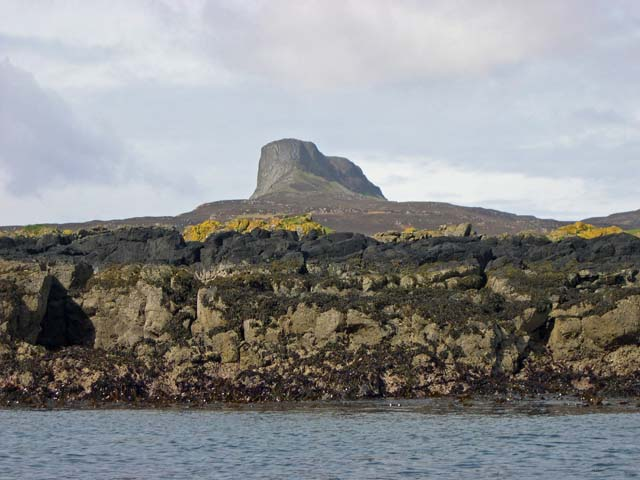
The coast at Kildonnan

Early Iron Age hut circles are found throughout the island. One located near the northeast coast near Sron na h-Iolaire is close to a cave to which walls have been artificially added; several hammerstones are located in the cave and surrounding vicinity, some with concretions of crushed shells stuck to them. The cave site is difficult to reach leading archaeologists to speculate that the site may have been used for hermitic purposes.

Later in the Iron Age, the inhabitants of Eigg chose to fortify the island. Small fortifications restrict access to rocky knolls at Garbh Bealach west of Galmisdale and Poll Duchaill on the northwest coast and on the promontory of Rudha na Crannaig south of Kildonnan. More substantial duns existed at Galmisdale Point, and at Loch nam Ban Mora, the latter of which is located on an island.

=== Early Christianity ===
The Irish missionary activity which caused Columba to found a monastery on Iona also brought the Irish monk Donnán to Eigg around 600 AD, where he established a monastery, at Kildonnan. Columba had warned him of the dangers of settling in Pictish territory and Donnan was murdered on Eigg along with 52 of his monks in 617.

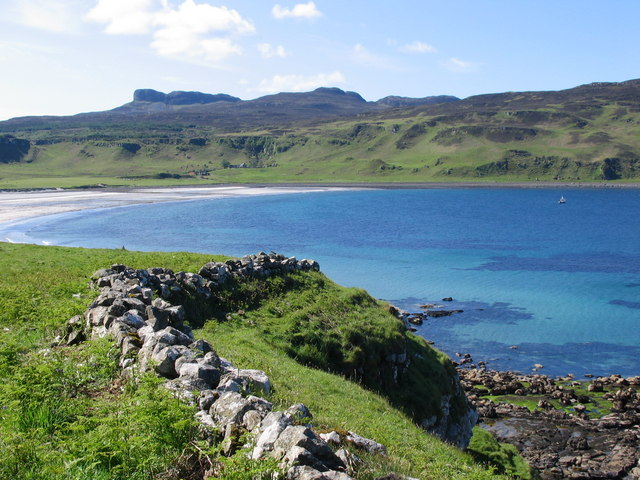
The Bay of Laig

By the following century, the monastery was significant enough for the death of its superior, Oan, to be mentioned in the Annals of Ulster. The monastery, which was excavated in 2012, was located within an oval enclosure, surrounded by a ditch, housing a rectangular chapel in the centre, and with a handful of smaller buildings either side. A handful of early inscribed stone slabs were located there, of which one bears a Pictish design, comprising a hunting scene, (Note: An image of the Pictish design is located here.) with a cross on its obverse.

On the coast at the opposite side of the island, are 16 or more quare cairns, lined up neatly into groups; they are each between 3.5 and 5 metres (11 and 16 ft) square, most being bordered by a stone kerb, and some having upright cornerstones. This form of cairn is usually associated with the Pictish kingdoms of the first millennium AD. The site may thus have some connection with the contemporary monastery at Kildonnan.

=== Kingdom of the Isles ===
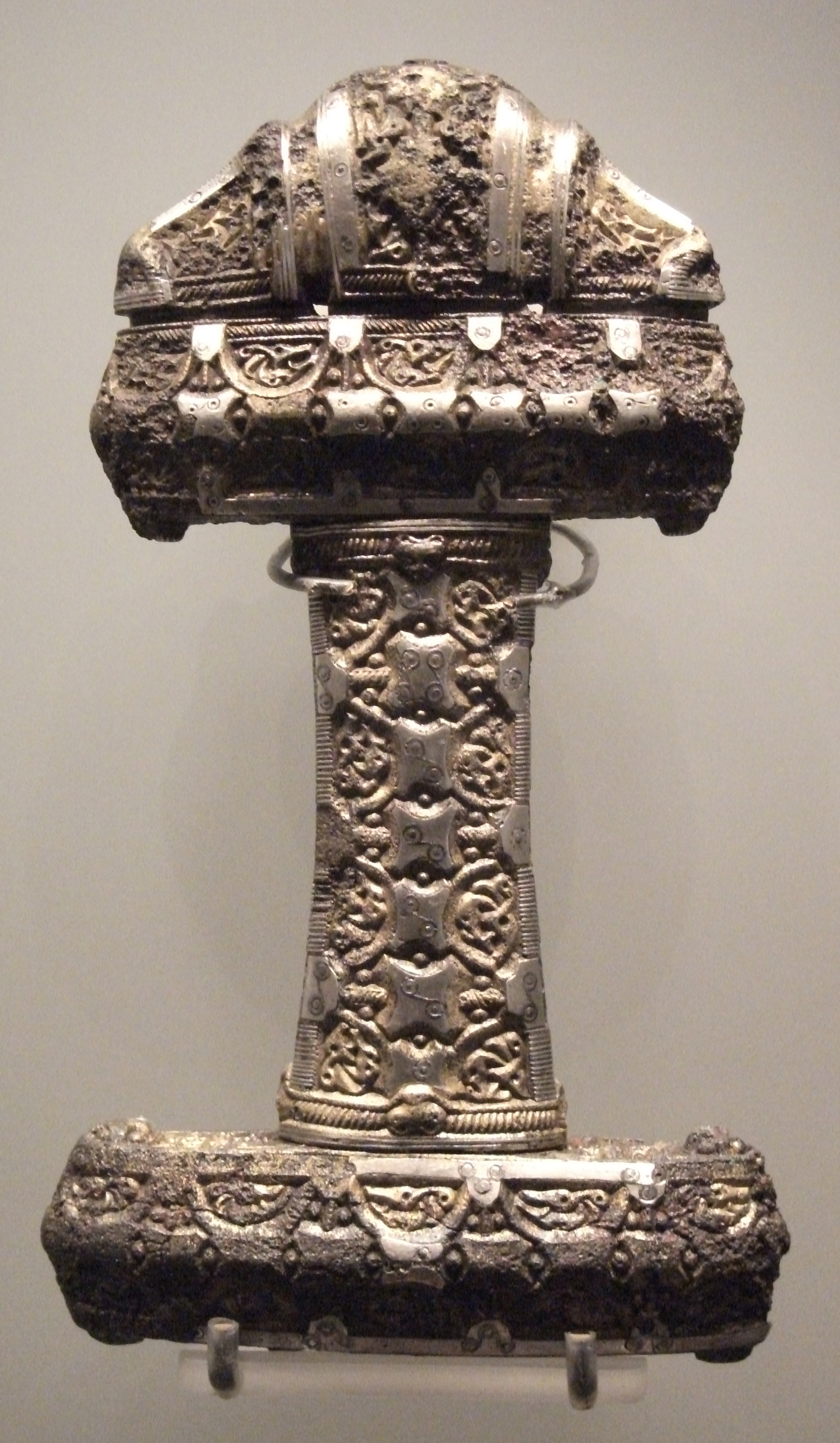
Viking sword hilt found in a tumulus at Dail Sithean

Commencing in the early 9th century Norse settlers established the Kingdom of the Isles throughout the Hebrides. A silver/bronze sword handle from the beginning of this period was found in 1830, buried in a field named Dail Sithean near Kildonnan, together with an iron axehead, leather belt, buckle, wollen cloth, and a whetstone. Wetlands near Laig, (which became peat-bog, during later centuries) appear to have been used for storing partly finished boat parts, as was common in Viking Scandinavia. A few oak posts, 6 feet (1.8 m) in length, for the stern of a longship were found there. A simple bronze brooch was found at a nearby site.

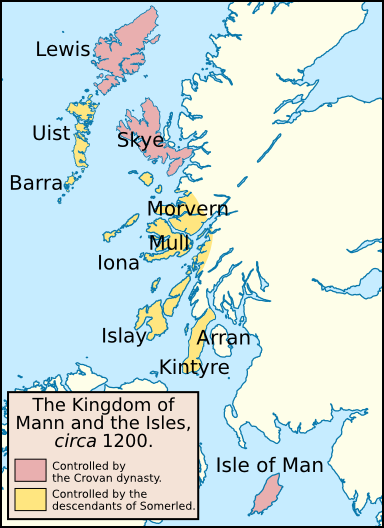
The Suðreyjar in about 1200: the lands of the Crovan dynasty and the descendants of Somerled

By the late 11th century the Isles were controlled by the Crovan dynasty but the dictatorial style of Guðrøðr Óláfsson (aka Godred the Black) appears to have made him very unpopular with the Islesmen, and the ensuing conflicts were the beginning of the end for Mann and the Isles as a coherent territory under the rule of a single magnate. The powerful barons of the isles began plotting with an emerging and forceful figure – Somerled, Lord of Argyll. Godred engaged Somerled's forces in the naval Battle of Epiphany in 1156. There was no clear victor, but it was subsequently agreed that Godred would remain the ruler of Man, the northern Inner Hebrides and the Outer Hebrides, whilst Somerled's young sons would nominally control the southern Inner Hebrides, Kintyre and the islands of the Clyde under their father's supervision.

By the mid 13th century the Small Isles were in Lordship of Garmoran, a possession of Clan MacRory founded by Somerled's grandson Ruaidhrí mac Raghnaill. At this point the islands was nominally subject to Norway but in 1266, the Treaty of Perth transferred the territories of the Kingdom of the Isles to Alexander III of Scotland and Dubhghall mac Ruaidhrí, Lord of Garmoran, found that he had a new overlord. He, and others who had supported the Norse, had the opportunity to emigrate under the terms of the treaty and Dubhghall died in 1268, possibly in exile.

By 1337 the sole MacRory heir was Amy of Garmoran, who in that year married John of Islay, Lord of the Isles, leader of the MacDonalds, the most powerful group among Somerled's heirs. Circa 1350 they divorced and John deprived his eldest son, Ranald, of the ability to inherit the MacDonald lands. As compensation, John granted Lordship of the Uists to Ranald's younger brother Godfrey, and made Ranald Lord of the remainder of Garmoran, including Eigg. (Note: The marriage had by now produced three sons: Ranald, John and Godfrey< but John and Robert II of Scotland made an arrangement by which John divorced Amie and married Robert's daughter, Margaret Stewart. The divorce took place in 1350, not long after Amie's inheritance of Garmoran.)

=== Early Clanranald rule ===
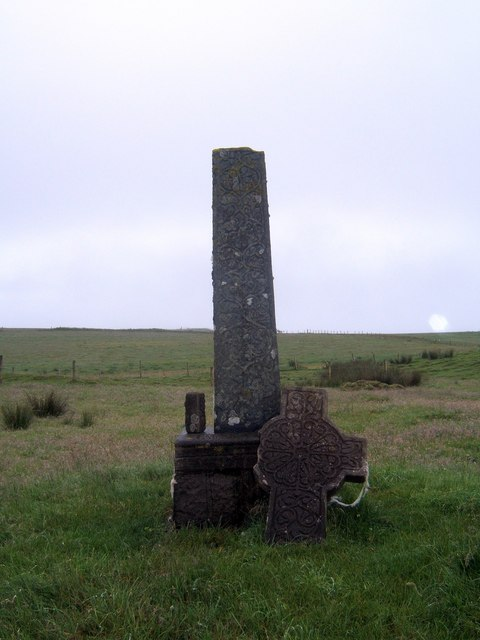
Remains of the high cross at Kildonnan

Upon the death of John of Islay his son Donald, Ranald's half-brother, was named Lord of the Isles at Kildonan on Eigg in 1387. Ranald, who became the founder of Clan Macdonald of Clanranald, appeared content with this decision by his father as suggested in the Charter of 1373, the misgivings of many of the noblemen of the Isles notwithstanding. (Note: Donald was appointed "contrary to the opinion of the men of Innsigall". MacPherson quoting W. F. Skene.)

However, when Ranald died in 1386 at Castle Tioram, Godfrey seized his lands, leading to violent disputes between his heirs (the Siol Gorrie) and those of Ranald (Clanranald). In 1427 James I arrested the leaders and declared the Lordship of Garmoran forfeit.

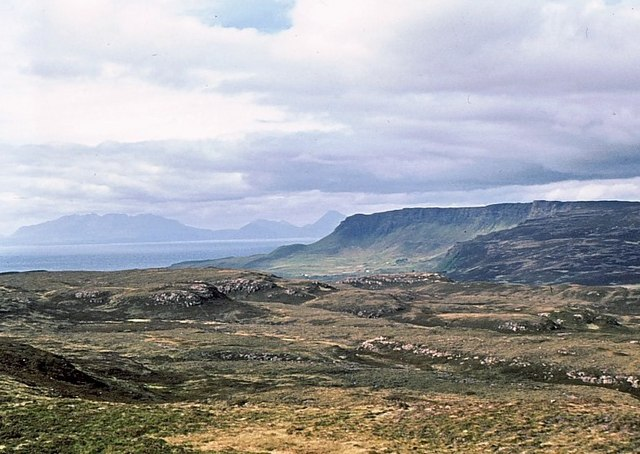
Central and northern Eigg

Ranald Bane MacAllan, leader of Clanranald, refused to support the rebellion of Donald Dubh against James IV. In 1505, after the rebellion was defeated, he was "now in high favour at Court". In 1520, Ranald Bane's son Dougall, the 6th chief of Clanranald, was assassinated by his own clansmen in part for his lack of opposition to the crown. Leadership of Clanranald then passed not to his sons but to the Moidart branch of the clan. In 1534 John Moidartach, 8th of Clanranald, managed to obtain from the king a charter confirming his position as laird of Eigg and Morar.

Writing in 1549, Donald Munro, High Dean of the Isles wrote of "Egge" that it was: "gude mayne land with ane paroch kirk in it, with mony solenne geis; very gude for store, namelie for scheip, with ane heavin for heiland Galayis". (Note: Translation from Lowland Scots: "a good land with a parish church and many gannets; very good for sheep, with a good harbour for Highland galleys".)

==== Massacre cave ====
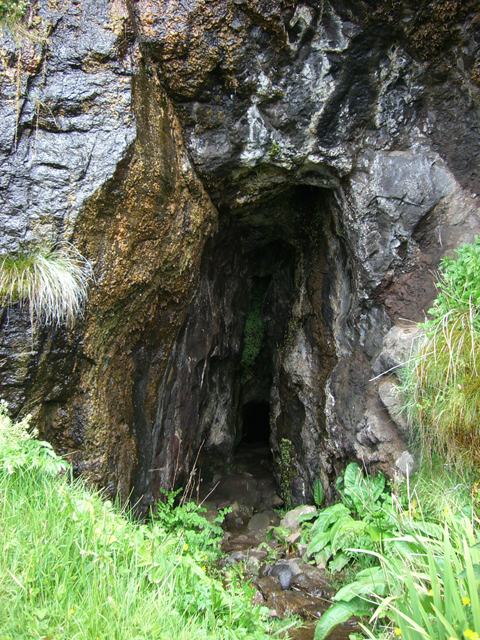
The entry to Uamh Fhraing

Uamh Fhraing, also known as the Cave of Francis (Note: MacPherson notes that the Gaelic Uamh Fhraing is usually translated as the Cave of Francis but that "no reasonable explanation" exists for this and that "an etymology which connected them with the local physical features or with the event which occurred would be more in accordance with Gaelic topography.) or the Ribbed Cave, lies on a raised beach on the south coast of Eigg. The entrance is low and narrow but the interior is about 60 metres (200 ft) long and 6 metres (20 ft) wide. In 1577, according to Clan MacLeod historians, a MacLeod galley was forced ashore by bad weather at Eilean Chathasteil. Led by a foster-son of Alasdair Crotach the 30 men roasted some cattle and "molested" the young girls who were tending them. The local men then arrived on the islet and massacred most of the MacLeods, sparing only a few leaders whose legs and arms were broken and who were then cast adrift in the Minch. They were however either rescued by MacLeods from elsewhere or perhaps drifted back to Dunvegan. In the MacDonald version of the story the girls were raped and the MacLeods were asked to leave. Looking for revenge, a large group of MacLeods led by Alasdair Crotach landed on Eigg, but had been spotted by the islanders, all but one of whom decided to hide in the cave.

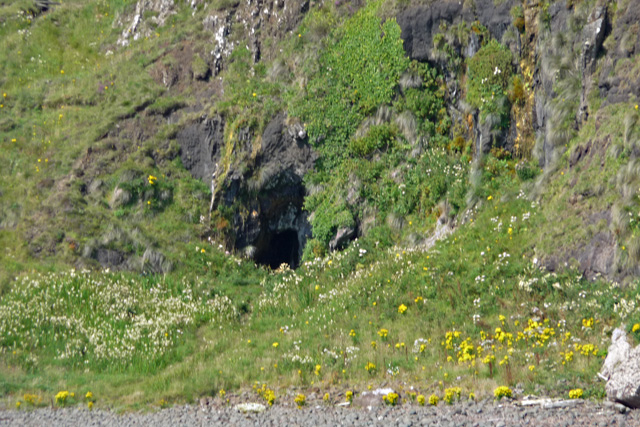
The entrance from a short distance away

The traditions go on to say that the MacLeods conducted a thorough but fruitless search for the inhabitants. They found only an old lady at the singing sands who they spared and left the island after 3 days. Just as they were leaving they saw a scout outside the cave and were able to follow their footprints in the snow to the entrance. The MacLeods piled thatch and heather at the cave entrance, and set fire to it. Water from a waterfall nearby dampened the flames, so that the cave was filled with smoke, asphyxiating the 395 people inside. Human remains inside the cave have been reported many times over the centuries. (Note: For example, by Boswell in 1773, by Sir Walter Scott in 1814, and Hugh Miller in 1845.) Most of the remains were removed from the cave and reburied by 1854 although occasionally further sets of human bones are exposed. (Note: As happened in 2017, when tourists discovered bones that turned out to be from a single 16 year old.)

However, serious doubts remain about the veracity of the tale. MacPherson wrote of it that "it is curious to find how difficult it is to determine its date or to decide with certainty on whom the odium of this deed should lie." (Note: A Free Church minister of Eigg stated "the less I enquired into its history... the more I was likely to feel I knew something about it".) The difficulties include that both Alasdair Crotach and his son Uilleam died long before 1577 and that similar stories are related about both Coll and Ardnamurchan. Furthermore, Privy Council papers from 1588 describe massacres on all the Small Isles perpetuated by Lachlan MacLean of Duart and 100 Spanish soldiers from the crew of an Armada vessel that sank off Tobermory. (Note: MacLean was imprisoned in Edinburgh by James VI for this attack but was allowed to escape and faced no further punishment.) The idea that two such massacres occurred on Eigg within eleven years has thus been questioned. (Note: Fr. Cornelius Ward's 1625 report made no reference to events at "massacre cave", perhaps surprising given that if it were literally true everyone on the island over forty-eight would have been an incomer.)

=== Jacobite risings ===
Clan Ranald took part in the Jacobite rising of 1689 against William II. The following year a boat had gone from Eigg to Armadale on Skye and found that the Royal Navy ship the Dartmouth was anchored there. A brawl broke out and one of the Cameronian soldiers was killed. The captain ordered the Dartmouth to Eigg and pillaged the island. The soldiers also took an island girl on board and returned her the next day with her hair shorn. (Note: According to Clan Ranald tradition there was large scale rape and murder on Eigg. Captain Pottinger's ship's log does not mention these events and Clan Ranald traditions claim he tampered with the log to cover them up.)

The men of Eigg also rose and fought in both the Jacobite risings of 1715 and 1745. After the failure of the rebellion a navy vessel arrived on the island seeking one of the Clanranald officers, John MacDonald of Kinlochmoidart. After his discovery on the island all 38 surviving islanders who had served in the '45 were arrested by Captain John Ferguson. They were held on board H.M.S. Furnace and remained there when it became a prison hulk anchored in the River Thames off Gravesend, Kent. Although many died aboard the Furnace from torture, disease, or starvation, the remaining 16 were eventually transported to the Colony of Barbados and the Colony of Jamaica, to work as slave laborers on sugar cane plantations. (Note: In his 1967 history John S. Gibson commented that "The lists of government prisoners of the '45 confirm this tale, including as they do the names of sixteen Eigg men, marked as prisoners from the 2nd of June, and for transportation to the Barbadoes" [which] means that the rest had died in the misery of their imprisonment.")

=== 19th century clearances ===
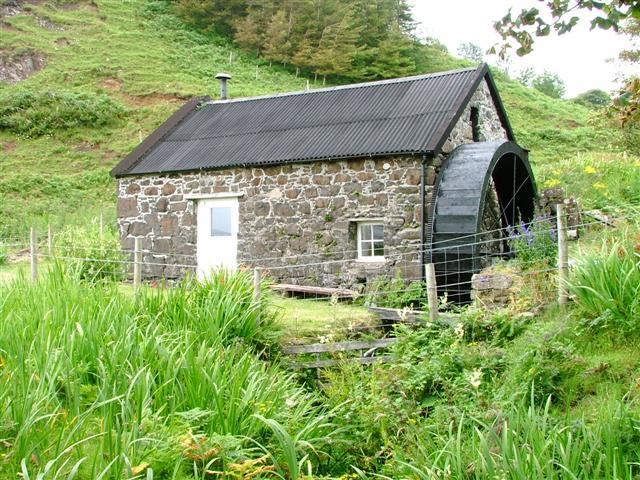
The 19th century mill, now a holiday bothy

The 18th century introduction of the potato to Eigg lead to increased yields compared to cereal growing and by the end of the century the population had expanded to about 500 The outbreak of the Peninsular War created a potential new route to wealth, by limiting foreign supplies of valuable minerals. Kelp could be harvested to produce soda ash and rapidly increased in price. In 1817, the estate factors reduced the size of each tenancy (for example, Cleadale was re-arranged into 28 plots), to stop their tenants from becoming self-sufficient and forcing them to also harvest kelp in order to break even. However, soon after the creation of these smaller tenancies (crofts), foreign mineral supplies were re-introduced, as the Napoleonic Wars had ended. The kelp price crashed and the crofters struggled to avoid destitution.

Some families voluntarily emigrated to Antigonish County, Nova Scotia to escape both rising rents and crushing poverty. They settled on a high plateau near the coast of the Northumberland Strait, which they named Eigg Mountain. Meanwhile, like many other Anglo-Scottish landlords during the Highland Clearances, Ranald George Macdonald, 19th Chief of Clanranald issued orders to evict the whole village of Cleadale, and use the land for sheep; both to cover his debts and to continue funding his extremely extravagant spending.

Raonuill Dubh's son Aonghas Lathair MacDhòmhnaill took over the tack of Eigg and gained local infamy by beginning evictions from Cleadale. When severe hardships fell upon Aonghas Lathair and his family, which resulted in the tacksman committing suicide, the old people of Eigg blamed the family's misfortune on the curse that was said to have been put on them by the women whom he had evicted from Cleadale. In 1827 Macdonald found someone willing to purchase Eigg, and cancelled further evictions. After 440 years Clan Ranald rule of Eigg had come to an end.

=== Later lairds ===
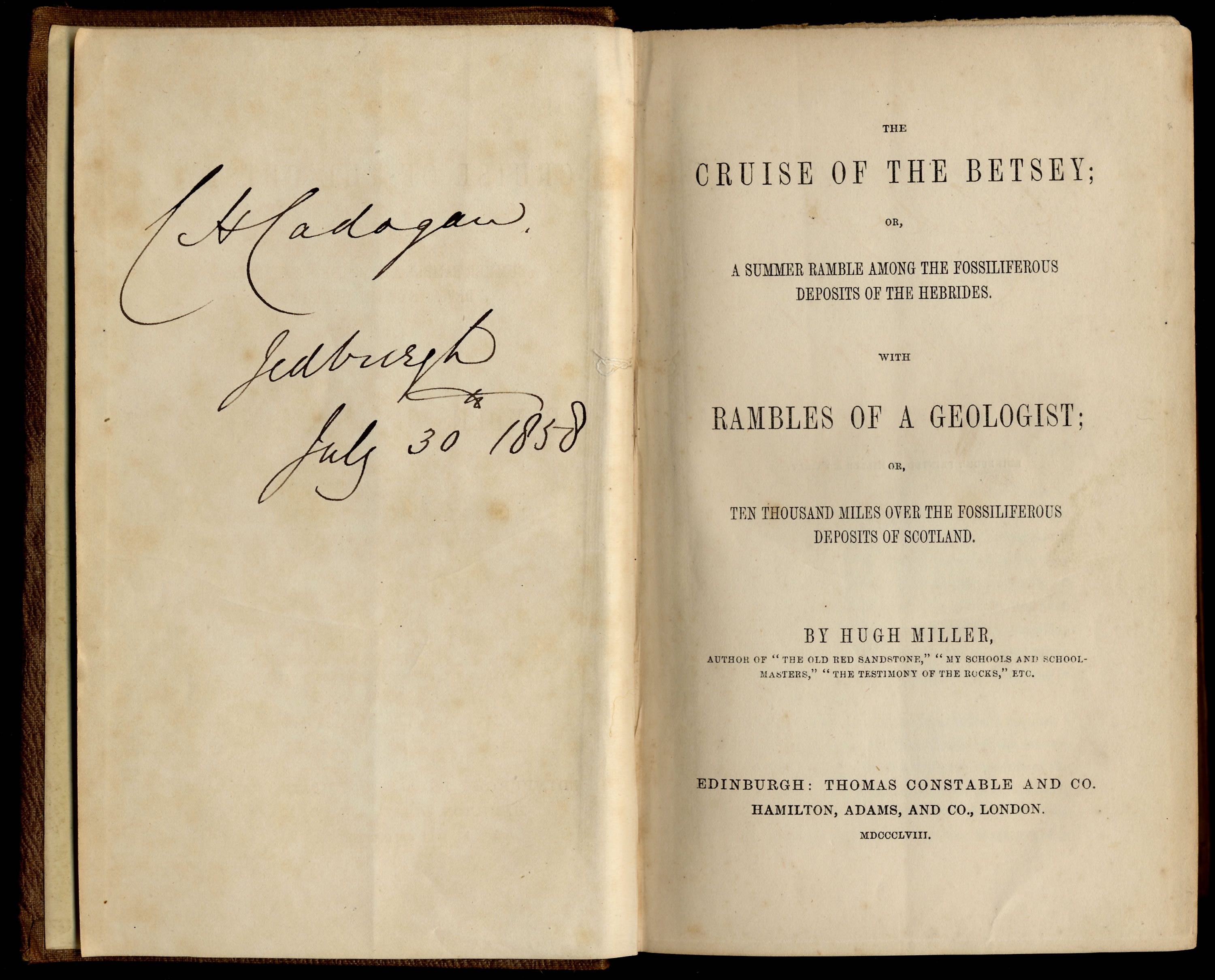
The Cruise of the Betsey (1858)

The purchaser and new owner of Eigg was Dr. Hugh MacPherson, a Sub-Principal at King's College, Aberdeen. He was not wealthy and had 12 children but was well-connected. The Scottish geologist and writer Hugh Miller visited the island in the 1840s and wrote a long and detailed account of his explorations in his book The Cruise of the Betsey published in 1858. Miller was a self-taught geologist and the book contains detailed observations of the geology of the island, including An Sgùrr and the singing sands.

The financial woes of the islanders were compounded by the Highland Potato Famine. Furthermore, Dr. MacPherson decided to evict his tenants en masse and replace them with herds of sheep. In 1853, the whole village of Gruilin was cleared and all but three families emigrated to Nova Scotia. One woman who was left behind never recovered from the evictions and threw herself into the sea off the cliffs. Three more villages were similarly cleared shortly thereafter.

The MacPhersons sold Eigg to Robert Thompson, a wealthy shipbuilder, in 1893. He died in 1913 and is buried on Eilean Chathastail. After being sold by Thompson's family in 1917, the island passed through various hands, including the cabinet minister, Walter Runciman, until being purchased by Keith Schellenberg in 1975. Unlike his predecessors, who had sought to use the resources of the island for their own power, profit, or leisure, Schellenberg had conservationist motives; he wished to restore its listed buildings, and preserve the natural environment.

=== Community buy-out ===
In the early 1990s, a fire at Schellenberg's home on the island destroyed a 1920s Rolls-Royce; Police suspected the fire was due to arson. Some locals claimed that since the late 1980s, he had neglected homes, closed the community hall, and restricted leases. While admitting that he had closed the community hall (but only in the evenings), and had refused to continue one particular lease, he told the press that "drunken hippies and drop-outs" were unfairly branding him a despot. In 1994, now in his 60s, Schellenberg concluded that trying to conserve the island was not worth facing violent intimidation for, and in the following year sold it to Gotthilf Christian Eckhard Österle from Germany who styled himself "Professor Marlin Eckhard-Maruma" or simply "Maruma" and who claimed to be an artist; Schellenberg retained ownership of the 18th century Manse.

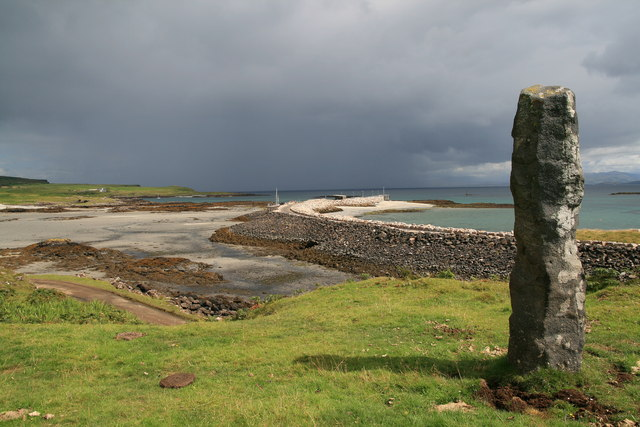
Modernist sculpture commemorating the trust's purchase of the island

Nevertheless, by then a community trust had been formed by the Highland Council, the Scottish Wildlife Trust, and a number of residents – particularly those newly moved to the island – with a view to buying Eigg from the laird. In 1997, this Isle of Eigg Heritage Trust persuaded Eckhard to sell, and bought it from him. The ceremony to mark the handover took place a few weeks after the 1997 General Election and was attended by the Scottish Office Minister, Brian Wilson, a long-standing advocate of land reform; he used the occasion to announce the formation of a Community Land Unit within Highlands and Islands Enterprise to support further land buy-outs in the region.

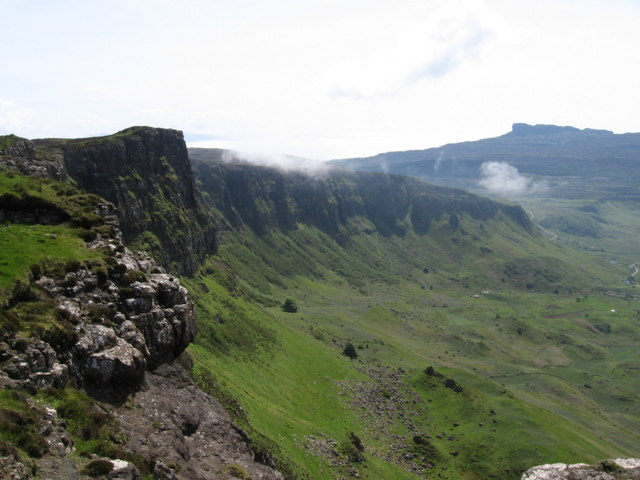
Cleadale from the northern end of the island

Between then and the 2011 census, the ordinarily resident population expanded from 65 to 83; this increase of 24 percent (six times greater than for the Scottish islands as a whole (Note: which grew by only 4%, to a population of 103,702)) was principally formed by young people who moved to Eigg to set up in business, as well as a handful of former residents returning to the island. However, by 2003, the residents' representatives on the trust's board were entirely people who had moved to the island since the trust took over.

A few longstanding residents complained that the trust focused on the new residents, while ignoring the concerns of the families who had lived on the island for generations; for example, they complained that new mains power connections, and housing provision, was given to the families of trust members, not indigenous islanders. One islander from an old Eigg family declared that the trust "is not a democracy ... it is the mafia". More recently, more positive articles have been published, showing a different picture of the island.

Eigg was featured on the American television program 60 Minutes in November 2017 and an extended feature on its companion web site 60 Minutes Overtime in July 2018.

In its 2019 coverage of the island, National Geographic provided this summary of the ownership and current situation:

"after years of neglect by the previous laird, or estate owner, the people gained ownership themselves in 1997. Now, visitors to the nicknamed “People's Republic of Eigg” contend with nothing more dangerous than negotiating walking territory with sheep or engaging in cheeky yet informative banter with Charlie Galli, the sole taxi driver and self-proclaimed 'Eigg Gazette'" ... there is a single main road ... and a single stoplight ... to alert everyone when electricity is running low ... humble attractions like the tiny post-office-turned-museum detailing island history; a wee, closet-size shed boasting handcrafted curiosities for sale by the honor system; herds of distrustful sheep; and pit stops such as “Rest and Be Thankful,” a patio tea garden open only when the sun shines.

== Gaelic literature and music ==
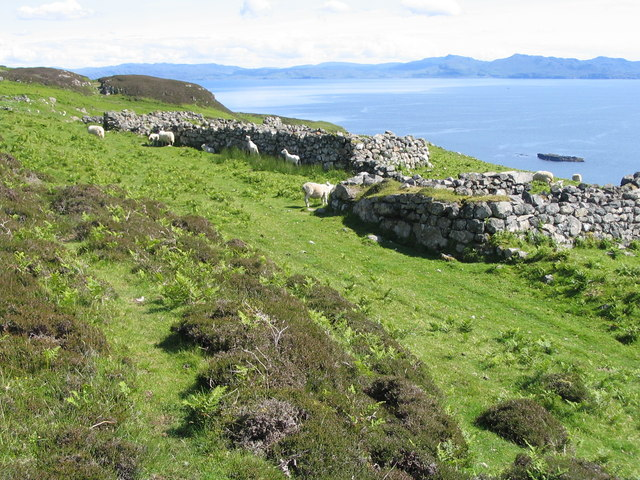
The remains of Lower Grulin

One of the men from Eigg who joined the Clanranald forces in the Jacobite rising of 1715 was Iain Dubh Mac Iain 'ic Ailein, the tacksman at Grulin. He was a well-known poet whose works include Trod nam Ban Eiggach that satirises the sharp-tongued women of the island and Bruadar mo Chor na Rioghachd ("A Dream about the State of the Nation"). The latter is a pro-Jacobite Aisling, or dream vision poem, in which he hopes to see Queen Anne ripped apart by deerhounds.

After the death of his father Raonuill Dubh MacDhòmhnuill, the eldest son of Alasdair Mac Mhaighstir Alasdair, moved from Arisaig to become Clanranald tacksman of Laig. While serving as tacksman Raonuill Dubh collected and published the poetry anthology called Comh-chruinneachidh Orannaigh Gaidhealach, or The Eigg Collection, in Edinburgh in 1776. He is believed to have drawn heavily upon oral poetry collected by his father and also upon a similar poetry collection made by Dr. Hector Maclean of Grulin. The latter manuscript contains an additional 104 pages of material, including fourteen of Tiree-born Canadian Gaelic bard Iain mac Ailein's poems in his own hand, and is now preserved in the Nova Scotia Archives.

Allan MacDonald collected numerous Catholic hymns and works of oral poetry by Donald MacLeod, a seanchaidh from Eigg resident in Oban. MacDonald supplemented these with several of his own compositions and translations and anonymously published a Gaelic hymnal in 1893.

Donald MacQuarrie was a resident of Grulin who became a pupil of piper Raghnall Mac Ailein Òig of Morar during the latter's visits to Eigg in the late 17th century. He developed quickly and received further support from the MacCrimmon piping family on Skye, becoming known as am Piobair Mór - "the great piper".

War poet and Seanchaidh Hugh MacKinnon (1894-1972), a veteran of the First World War, composed a Gaelic lament for the fallen soldiers of the island, Ò, tha mi 'n-duigh trom fo lionn-dubh, ("I am today sad and mournful"), which is still read aloud at the Eigg War Memorial every November 11.

== Religion ==
=== Catholicism ===
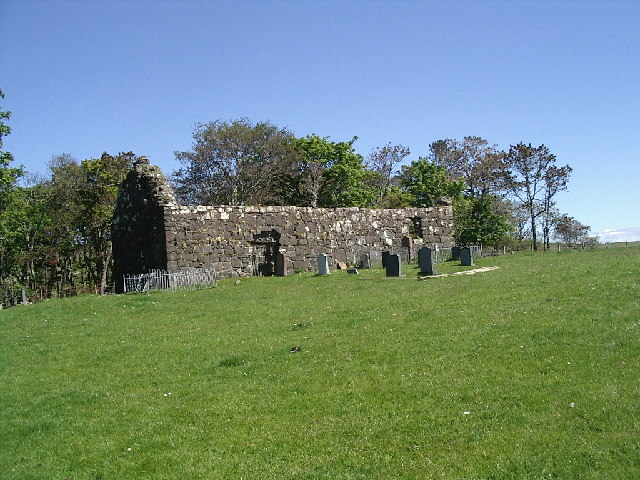
Kildonnan chapel

Allan, 9th chief of Clanranald, commenced the rebuilding of the Kildonnan Chapel on the site of Donnan's 7th century monastery in honour of his father, John Moidartach's, vow to build seven new churches on his lands. However it was likely never completed as it was found as an unroofed ruin by Fr. Cornelius Ward in 1625.

Ward, a Franciscan friar, had been sent by the Catholic Church in Ireland in order to proselytise the population of Scotland's west coast. His "chatty mission report" indicates that he converted 198 individuals and baptised 16 during his 8-day visit. (The only family not to convert were relatives of the Protestant minister of Sleat, Neil MacKinnon.) Infuriated by Ward's success, MacKinnon set off for Eigg in the company of some soldiers with the intention of arresting Ward but the islanders threatened him sufficiently forcefully to secure his withdrawal. The Clanranald bailie later persuaded him to turn a blind eye, in return for the island's tithes.

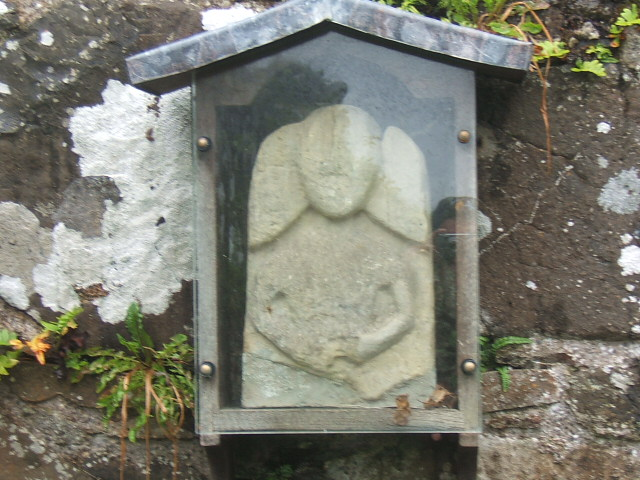
The carved human depiction

The friar was unable to reconsecrate the Chapel and it came to only be used for burials. One grave had a carved cover popularly re-interpreted as a medieval sheela na gig. Martin Martin recorded a ritual in 1703 that suggests that visiting priests were at pains to integrate traditional beliefs into their formal doctrines.

"There is a well, called St. Katherine's Well; the natives have it in great esteem, and believe it to be a catholicon for diseases. They told me that it had been such ever since it was consecrated by one Father Hugh, a Popish priest, in the following manner: he obliged all the inhabitants to come to this well, and then employed them to bring together a great heap of stones at the head of the spring, by way of penance. This being done, he said mass at the well, and then consecrated it; he gave each of the inhabitants a piece of wax candle, which they lighted, and all of them made the dessil, of going round the well sunways, the priest leading them: and from that time it was accounted unlawful to boil any meat with the water of this well."

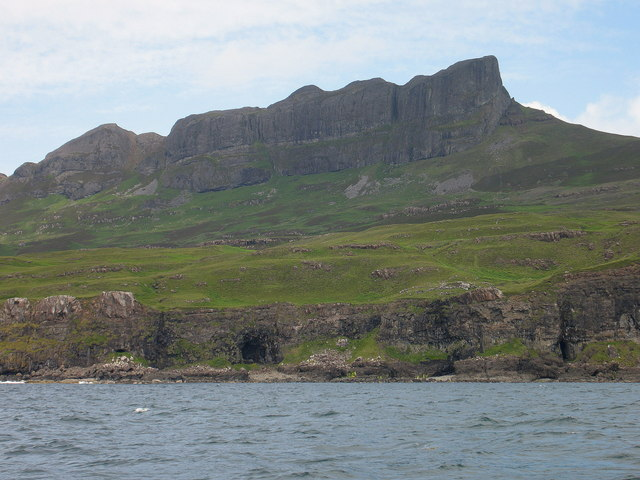
The entrance to Cathedral Cave below the heights of An Sgùrr

To evade the religious persecution the British government imposed upon the Catholic Church in Scotland and which contributed to the Jacobite risings, the laity secretly and illegally attended mass at a mass stone inside a large high-roofed coastal cave, which can only be accessed during low tide, now known as Cathedral Cave. Later, Catholic worship moved into "the lower floor of an old farmhouse" which remained the island's Mass house until 1910. In that year, St Donan of Eigg Roman Catholic Church was built in Cleadale by the Diocese of Argyll and the Isles and continues to be served by visiting priests from Morar.

=== Church of Scotland ===
The Reformation made slow headway in the Gàidhealtachd of Scotland due to the lack of Gaelic-speaking ministers. Eigg became part of the parish of Sleat in 1624 but there were no converts at that time. The Small Isles became a Church of Scotland parish in their own right in 1740. The first minister was Donald McQueen, who rarely ventured to Eigg as the only significant Protestant populations were on Muck and Rum. Malcolm Macaskill, known as Maighstir Calum, who became the incumbent in 1757 had the benefit of glebe land at Kildonnan to farm and he leased more land at Sandaveg and Sandavore. The glebe was later moved to Sandaveg and was the largest in Scotland at the time. The Skye Presbytery gave up a plan to rebuild the church at Kildonnan in favour of building a two-storey manse for him. This was not completed until 1790 and the first occupant was the new minister, Donald MacLean. MacLean developed a reputation for heavy drinking and was eventually deposed by the General Assembly.

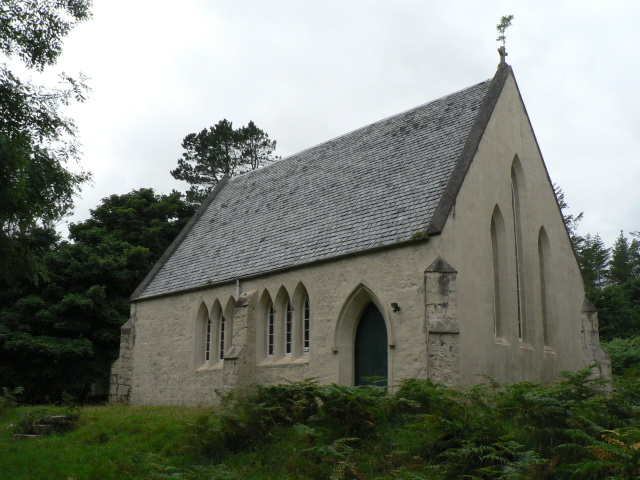
Sandavore kirk

The New Statistical Account of 1831 was penned by Revd. Neil Maclean, who noted that the parish had no road or church, no post or other regular means of communicating with the mainland and only one inn – at Galmisdale on Eigg. John Swanson became minister in 1838 and five years after his arrival he left the kirk and joined the Free Church of Scotland during the Disruption of 1843. Prior to his arrival relationships between the Catholic and Protestant populations of Eigg had been good and marriages between the two were common. However, Swanson's zealous fight against “Popery” led to increasing sectarianism. Swanson built a new school where lessons were taught in Gaelic, leading to a significant increase in literacy. He also introduced Gaelic bibles to the island, the teachings of which (now being accessible to ordinary citizens) led to growing anti-landlord feelings amongst the oppressed tenants. Having left the established church Swanson also had to leave the manse. All but three of his congregation of 200 followed him into the Free Church but he was denied the landlord's permission to build himself a house. Instead, he bought a small sailboat – the Betsey, later used by Hugh Miller - and “turned it into a floating manse”.

== Economy and transport ==
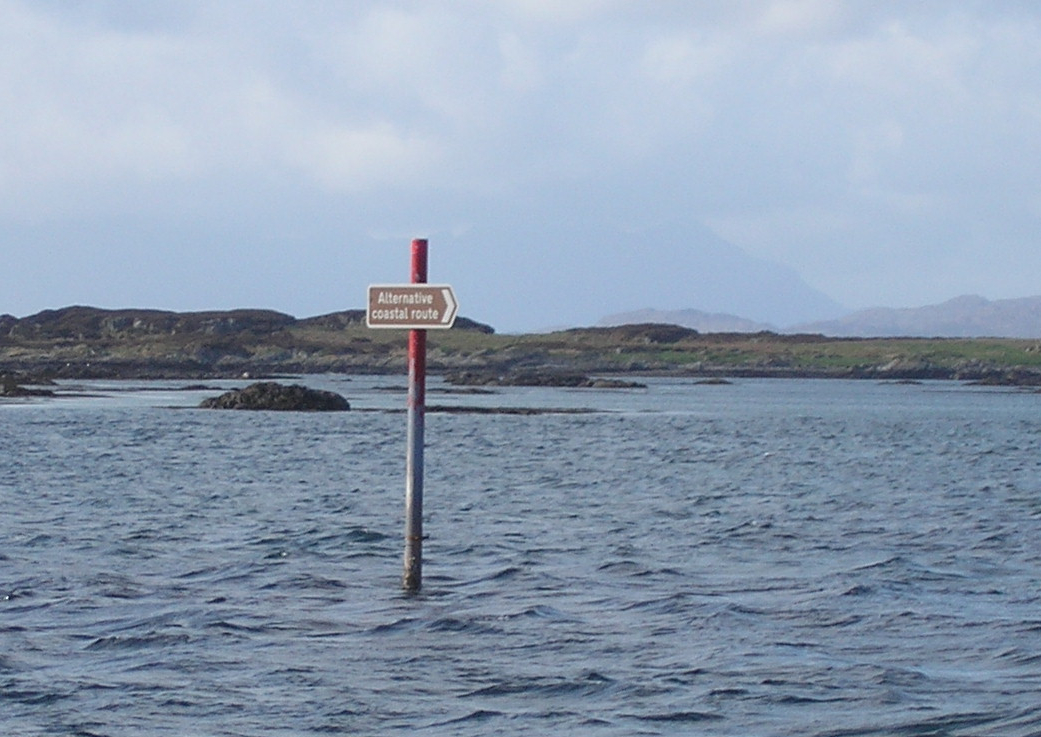
The view from MV Sheerwater en route from Arisaig

Tourism is important to the local economy, especially in the summer months, and the first major project of the Heritage Trust was An Laimhrig, a new building near the jetty to house the island's shop and post office, Galmisadale Bay restaurant and bar, a craft shop, and toilet and shower facilities, which are open 24 hours a day.

Conde Nast Traveller particularly recommends that visitors explore the Singing Sands beach, "dark Cathedral and Massacre caves, the abandoned village of Grulin or the island's most distinctive sight, the near vertically-sided volcanic plug of An Sgùrr".

There are two ferry routes to the island. There is a sheltered anchorage for boats at Galmisdale in the south of the island. In 2004 the old jetty there was extended to allow a roll-on roll-off ferry to dock. The Caledonian MacBrayne ferry MV Lochnevis sails a circular route around the four "Small Isles"—Eigg, Canna, Rùm and Muck from the fishing port of Mallaig. Arisaig Marine also runs a passenger ferry called the MV Sheerwater from April until late September from Arisaig on the mainland.

Around 2014 a beer brewery called Laig Bay Brewing was set up on the island.

In November 2017, a crew from the American television news magazine 60 Minutes visited Eigg. Its report stated that there was "one grocery shop, one primary school for five students and one pub at the tea room down by the wharf. The island's tiny electrical grid powers it all ... a combination of wind, hydroelectric and solar".

=== Electrification project ===
The Heritage Trust provisioned a mains electricity grid, powered from near 100% renewable energy sources. Previously, the island was not served by mains electricity and individual crofthouses had wind, hydro or diesel generators and the aim of the project is to develop an electricity supply that is environmentally and economically sustainable.

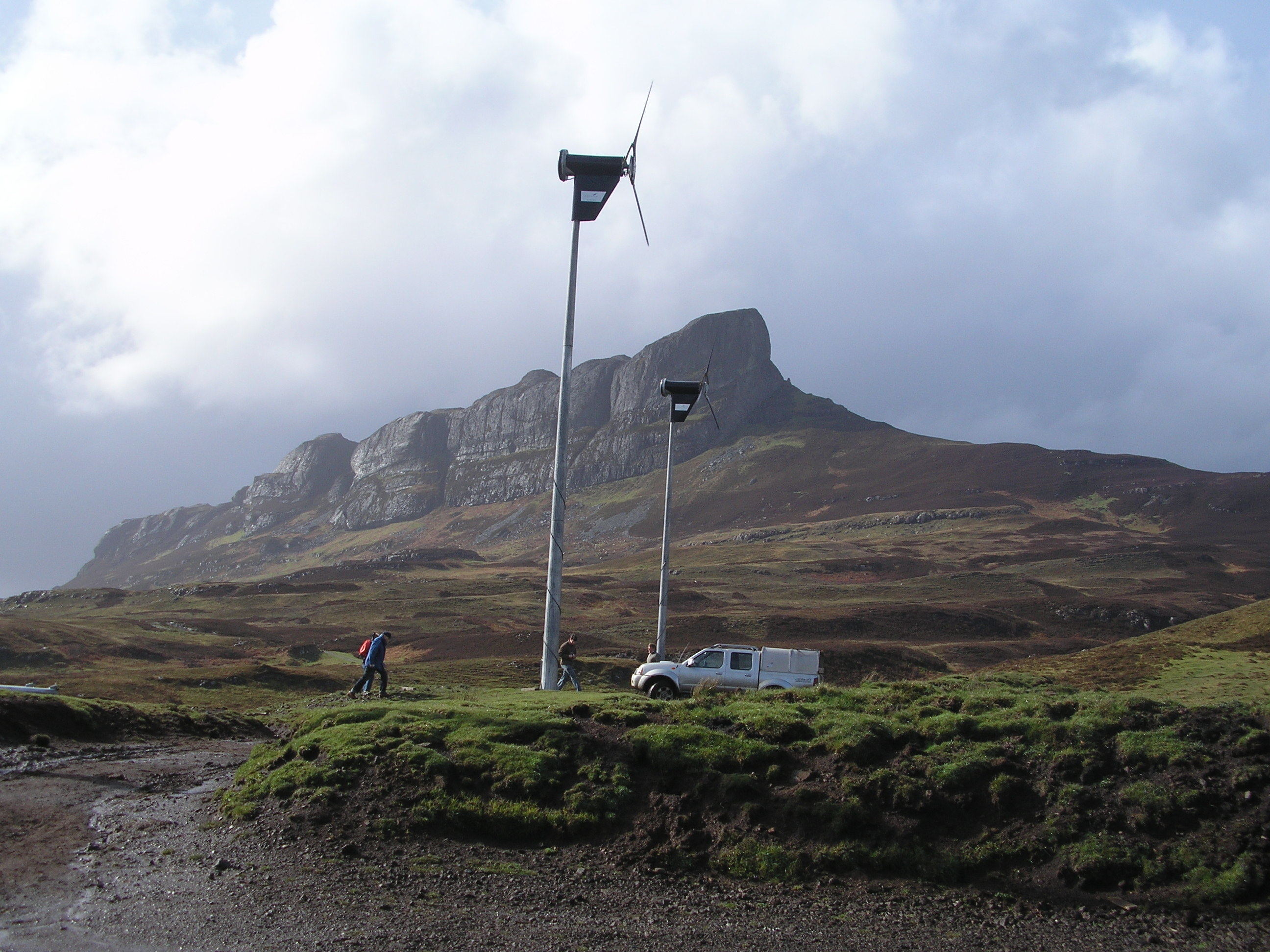
Two of Eigg's wind turbines

The new system incorporates a 9.9 kWp PV system, three hydro generation systems (totalling 112 kW) and a 24 kW wind farm supported by stand-by diesel generation, ultra-capacitors, flywheels and batteries to guarantee continuous availability of power. A load management system has been installed to provide optimal use of the renewables. This combination of solar, wind and hydro power should provide a network that is self-sufficient and powered 98 percent from renewable sources. On 1 February 2008 the system was switched on.

Eigg Electric generates a finite amount of energy and so Eigg residents agreed from the outset to cap electricity use at 5 kW at any one time for households, and 10 kW for businesses. If renewable resources are low, for example when there is less rain or wind, a "traffic light" system asks residents to keep their usage to a minimum. The traffic light reduces demand by up to 20 percent and ensures that there's always enough energy for everyone.

The Heritage Trust has formed a company, Eigg Electric Ltd, to operate the new £1.6 million network, which has been part funded by the National Lottery and the Highlands and Islands Community Energy Company.

=== Other sustainability projects ===
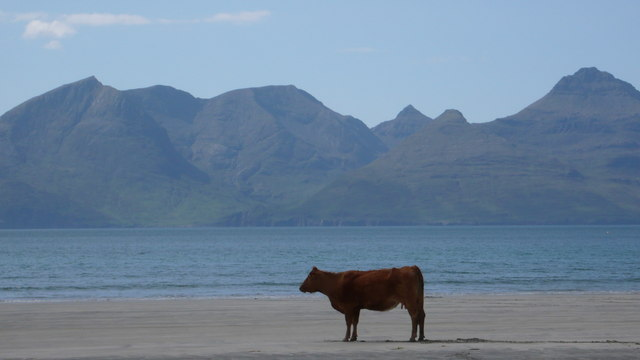
Cow on the beach

In September 2008, Eigg began a year-long series of projects as part of their success as one of ten finalists in NESTA's Big Green Challenge. While the challenge finished in September 2009, the work to make the island "green" is continuing with solar water panels, alternative fuels, mass domestic insulation, transport and local food all being tackled. In May 2009, the island hosted the "Giant's Footstep Family Festival", which included talks, workshops, music, theatre and advice about what individuals and communities can do to tackle climate change.

In January 2010, Eigg was announced as one of three joint winners in NESTA's Big Green Challenge, winning a prize of £300,000. Eigg also won the prestigious Ashden UK Gold Award in July 2010.

== Lighthouse ==
Eigg Lighthouse Eilean Chathastail
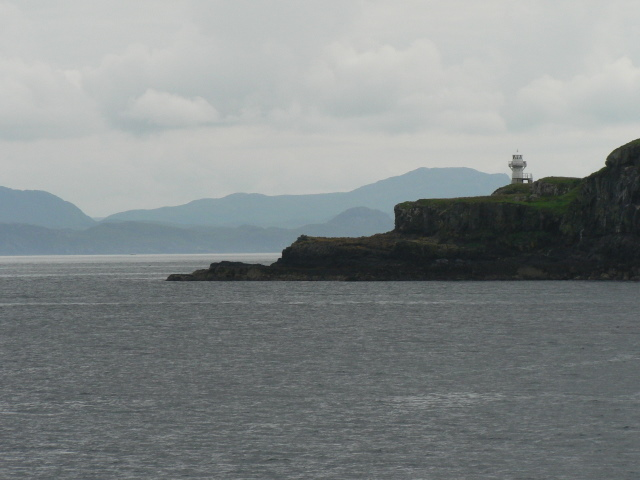
- Eilean Chathastail lighthouse viewed from the Mallaig-Eigg ferry.
- Location: Eilean Chathastail, Highland, United Kingdom
- Coordinates: 56°52′15″N 6°07′17″W

Tower
- Constructed: 1906
- Designed by: David Alan Stevenson, Charles Alexander Stevenson
- Construction: metal (tower)
- Height: 8 m (26 ft)
- Shape: cylinder
- Markings: White
- Power source: solar power
- Operator: Isle of Eigg Heritage Trust

Light
- Focal height: 24 m (79 ft)
- Range: 8 nmi (15 km; 9.2 mi)
- Characteristic: Fl W 6s

Eigg lighthouse is an active lighthouse located on the south-eastern corner of the islet of Eilean Chathastail, one of the smaller Small Isles about 110 metres (360 ft) off Eigg. The lighthouse was built in 1906 to a design by David A. and Charles Alexander Stevenson; it is a cylindrical metal tower only 8 metres (26 ft) high with gallery and lantern painted white. It is a minor light among those owned by Northern Lighthouse Board but day-to-day management rests with the Isle of Eigg Heritage Trust. The light emits a white flash every 6 seconds.

== Wildlife ==
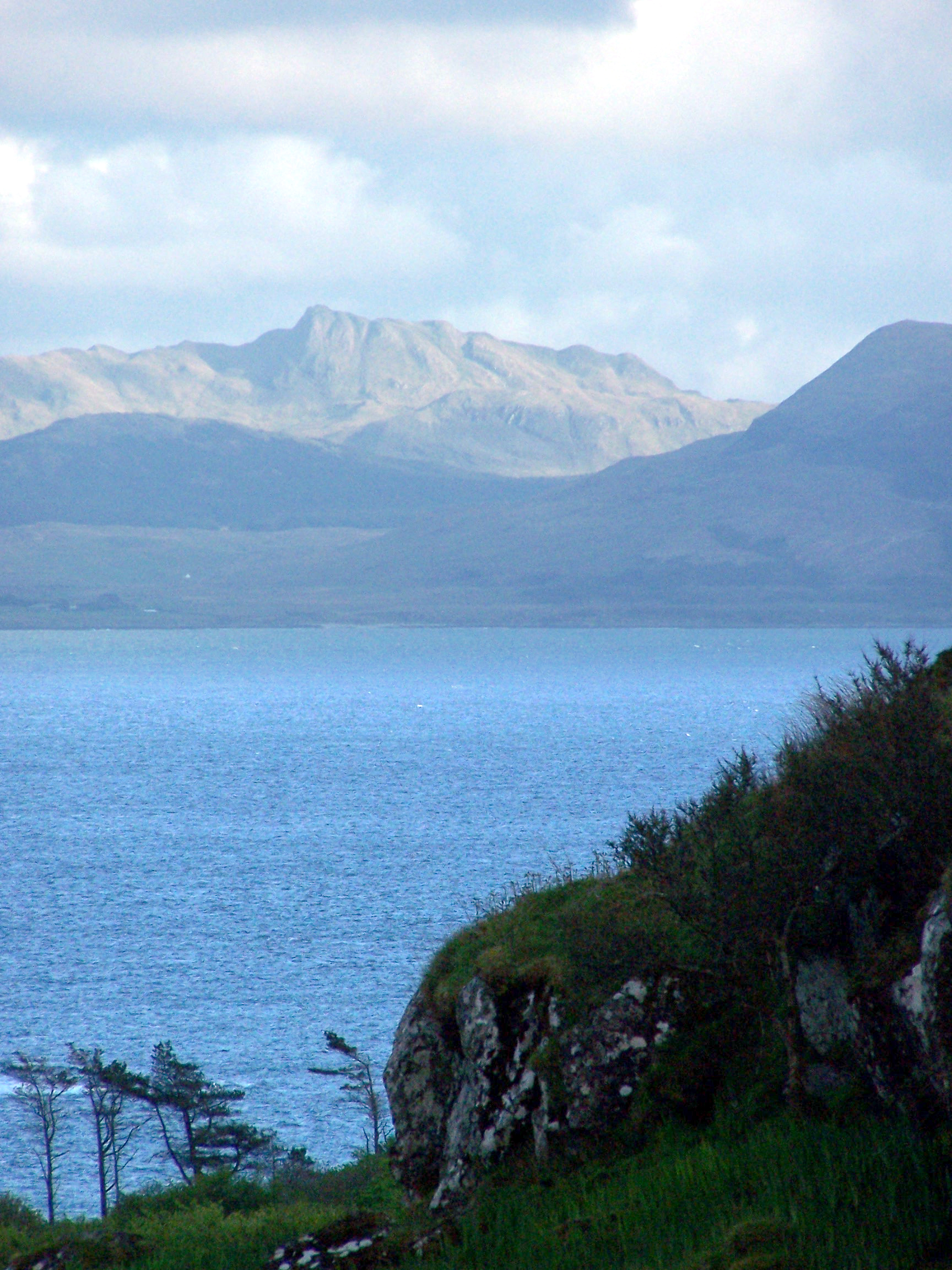
View of the mainland from Eigg

An average of 130 species of birds are recorded annually. The island has breeding populations of various raptors: golden eagle, buzzard, peregrine falcon, kestrel, hen harrier and short and long-eared owl. Great northern diver and jack snipe are winter visitors, and in summer cuckoo, whinchat, common whitethroat and twite breed on the island.

== See also ==
- Religion of the Yellow Stick
- List of lighthouses in Scotland
- List of Northern Lighthouse Board lighthouses
- List of community buyouts in Scotland
