= Galmisdale =

Coordinates: 56.881°N 6.139°W

Galmisdale: Scottish Gaelic: Galmasdail
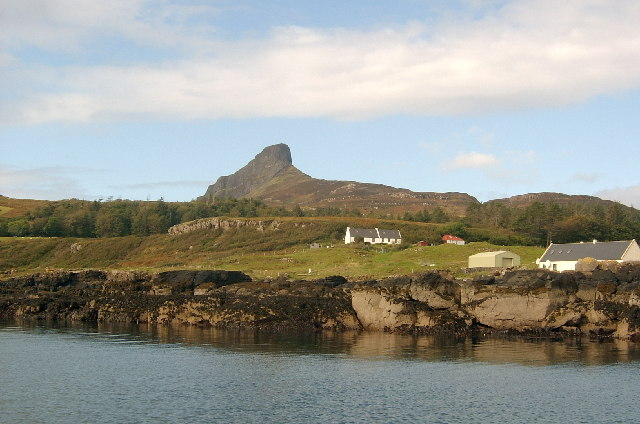
- The western side of Galmisdale with An Sgurr in the distance

- Location within the Lochaber area
- OS grid reference: NM479842
- Council area: Highland
- Country: Scotland
- Sovereign state: United Kingdom
- Post town: ISLE OF EIGG
- Postcode district: PH42
- Police: Scotland
- Fire: Scottish
- Ambulance: Scottish

Galmisdale is the main port of the island of Eigg, one of the Small Isles of the Inner Hebrides. It is in the Scottish council area of Highland.
