= An Sgùrr (Eigg) =

Mountain on Eigg, HIghland, Scotland, UK

Coordinates: 56.88406°N 6.16632°W

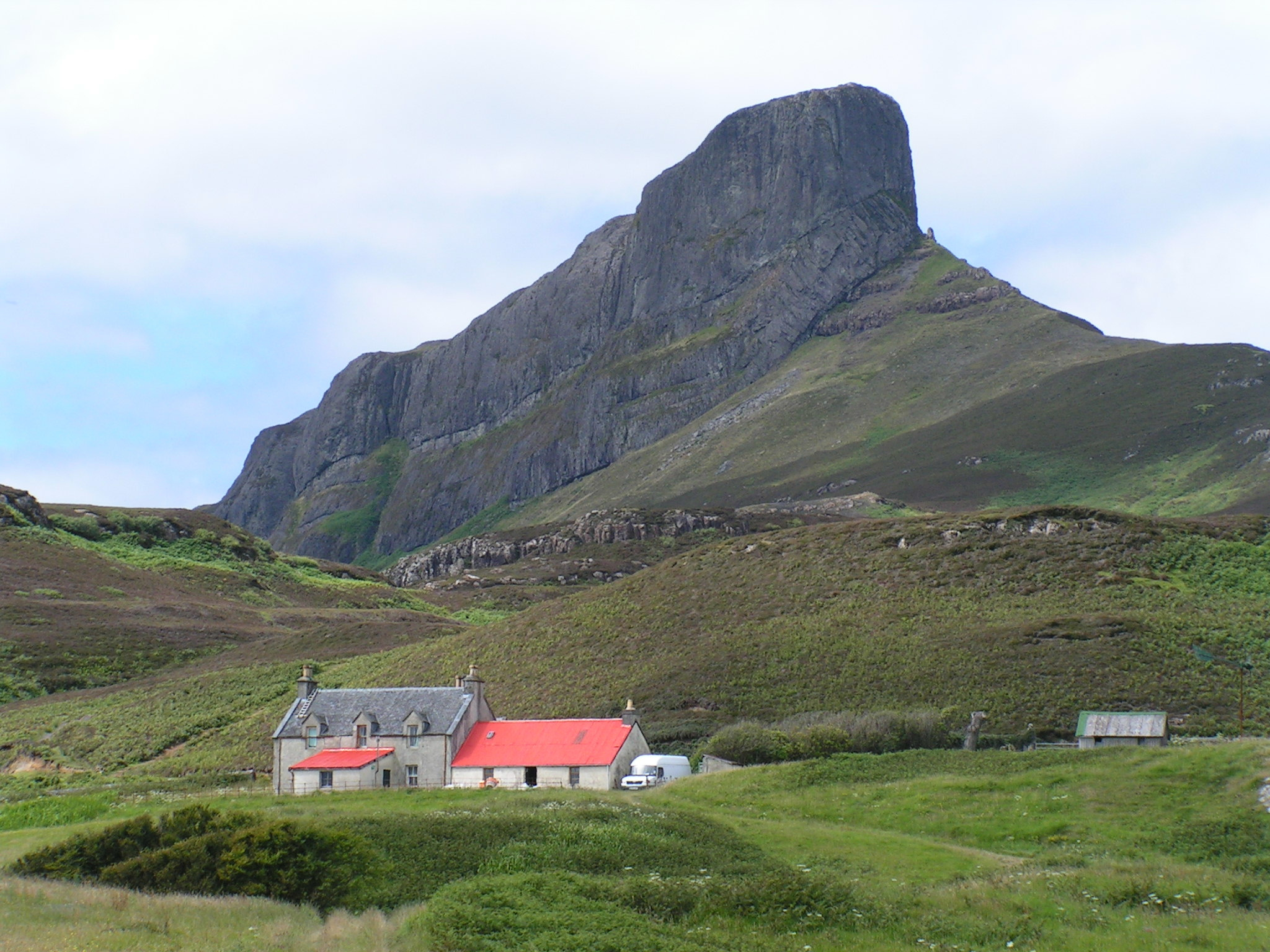
- The Nose of Sgùrr, seen from the southeast

Highest point
- Elevation: 393 m (1,289 ft)
- Prominence: 393 m (1,289 ft)
- Parent peak: none – HP Eigg
- Listing: Marilyn, Hardy

Naming
- English translation: The (rocky) peak
- Language of name: Gaelic
- Pronunciation: Scottish Gaelic: [ən ˈs̪kuːrˠ]

Geography
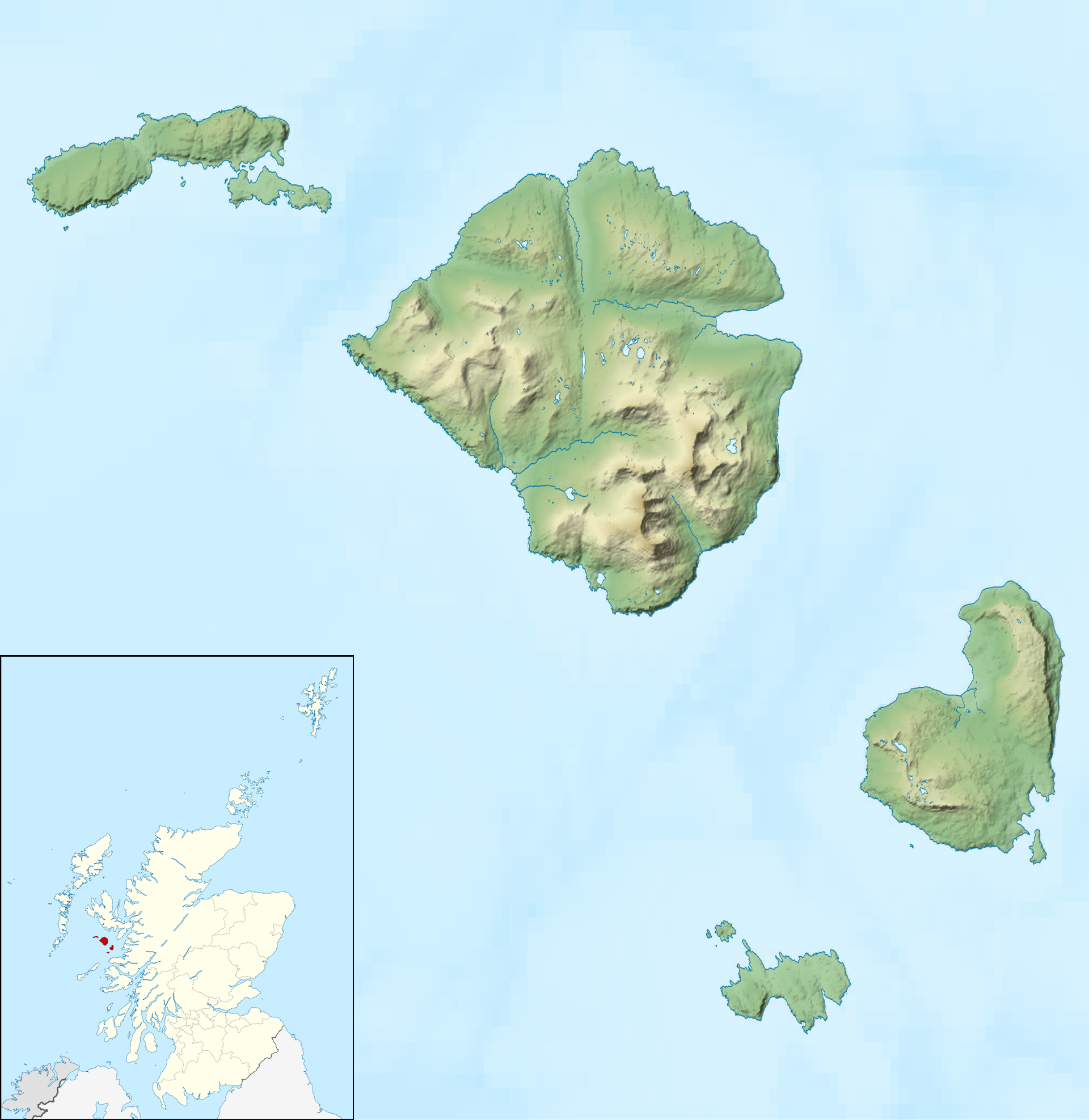
- Location within Small Isles
- Location: Eigg, Scotland
- OS grid: NM463847
- Topo map: OS Landranger 39

An Sgùrr, also known as the Sgùrr of Eigg, is the highest point on the island of Eigg in Scotland's Small Isles. It was formed 59 million years ago; the result of one of the last eruptions of a volcano, the core of which now forms the Isle of Rùm. Thick viscous pitchstone lava of rhyodacitic composition flowed out, filling a river valley. The lava cooled and formed column-like structures; similar to those at the Giant's Causeway.

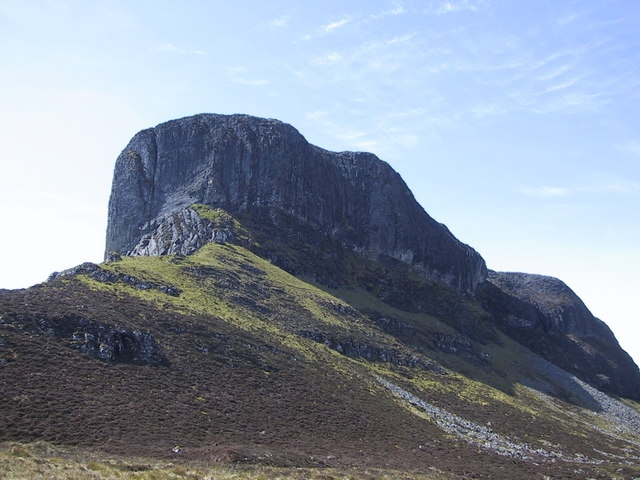
The other side

The surrounding basalt was softer than the pitchstone, and hence the valley became inverted, with the pitchstone withstanding the erosion far better than the surrounding rock. An Sgùrr is thus an inselberg. The mountain appears most strikingly in the view of the eastern end, known as the Nose of Sgùrr.

The peak is most frequently climbed from the ferry terminal at Galmisdale on the southeast corner of Eigg. A rough track heads west, passing between the northern side of An Sgùrr and the shoreline. About three-quarters of the way along the side of the ridge there is a gully; a fairly easy scramble allows access to the summit ridge. The route now almost doubles back on itself, heading east to reach the summit, which is crowned by a trig point. The climb, from ferry terminal to the Nose of An Sgùrr and back, takes at least four hours.
