= Pitchstone =

Volcanic rock

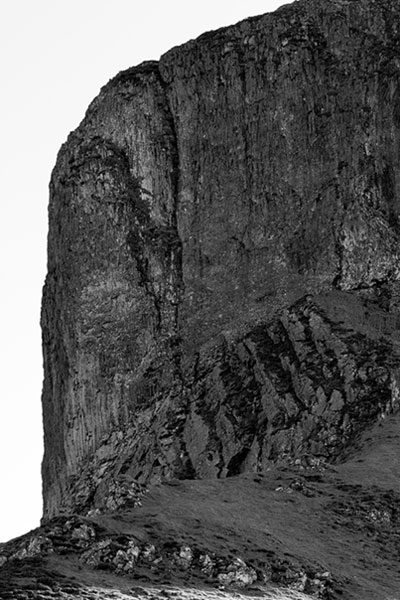
A pitchstone ridge of An Sgùrr in Eigg, Scotland

Pitchstone is a dark coloured, glassy volcanic rock formed when felsic lava or magma cools quickly. Since it is a volcanic glass, pitchstone may have a conchoidal fracture. Pitchstones may also contain phenocrysts, in which case it is a form of vitrophyre. Pitchstone has a resinous lustre, or silky in some cases, and a variable composition. Its colour may be mottled, streaked, or uniform brown, red, green, gray, or black. It is an extrusive rock that is very resistant to erosion.

The pitchstone ridge of An Sgùrr on the Isle of Eigg, Scotland, was possibly formed as a lava flow in a valley.

Pitchstone from the Isle of Arran was used as the raw material for making various items from the Mesolithic through the Neolithic to the Early Bronze Age. Mesolithic use appears to have been limited to the Isle of Arran itself, while in later periods the material or items made from it were transported around Britain.
