= Geology of the Isle of Skye =

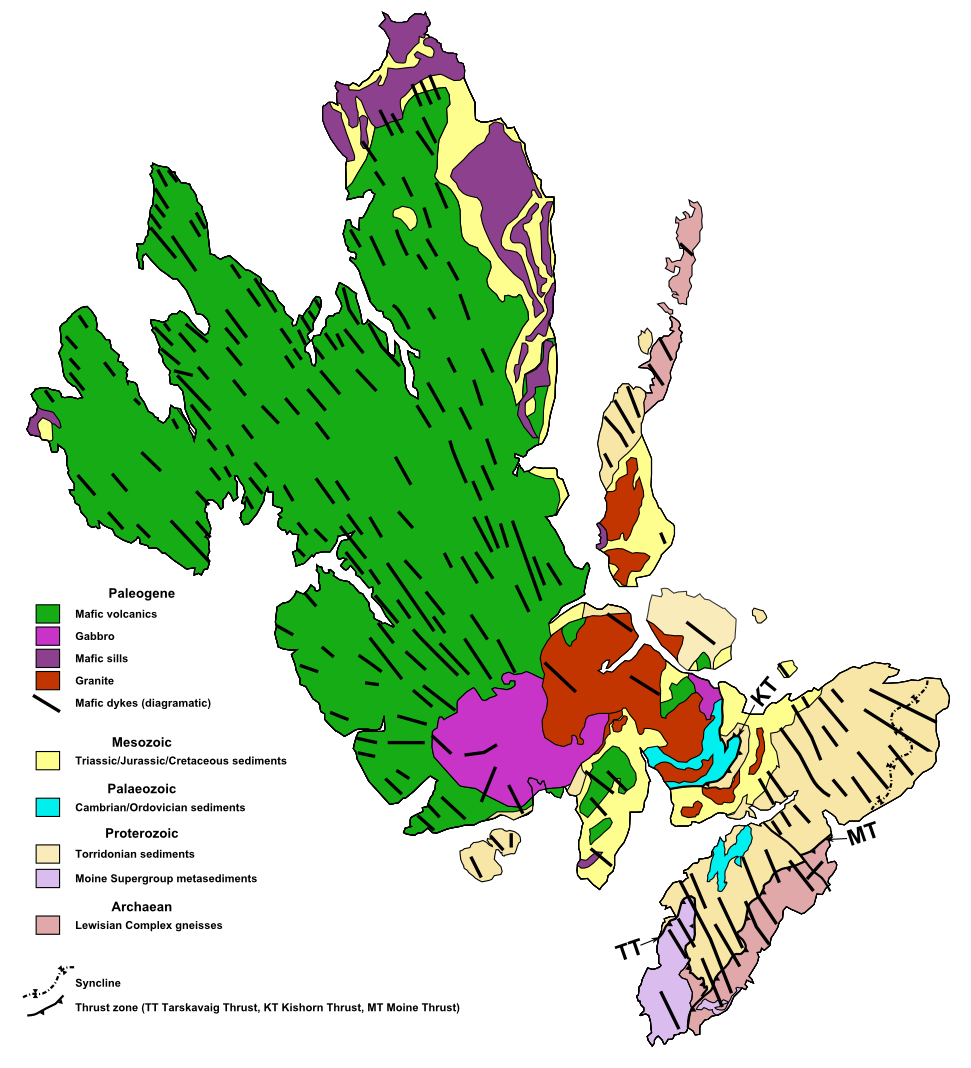
Geological map of Skye

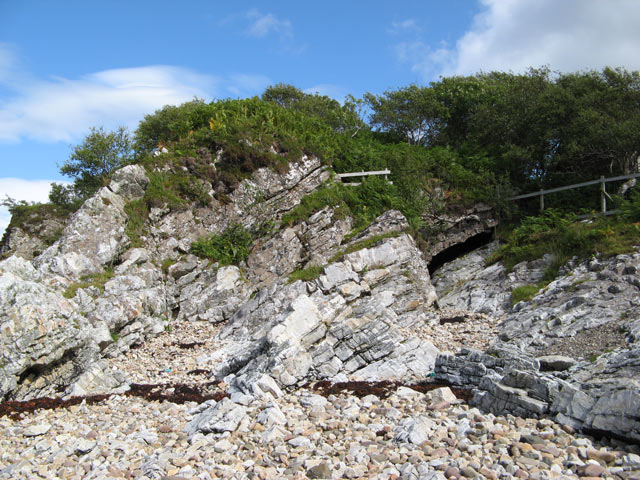
Basal quartzite of the Eriboll Group from the Ord Window

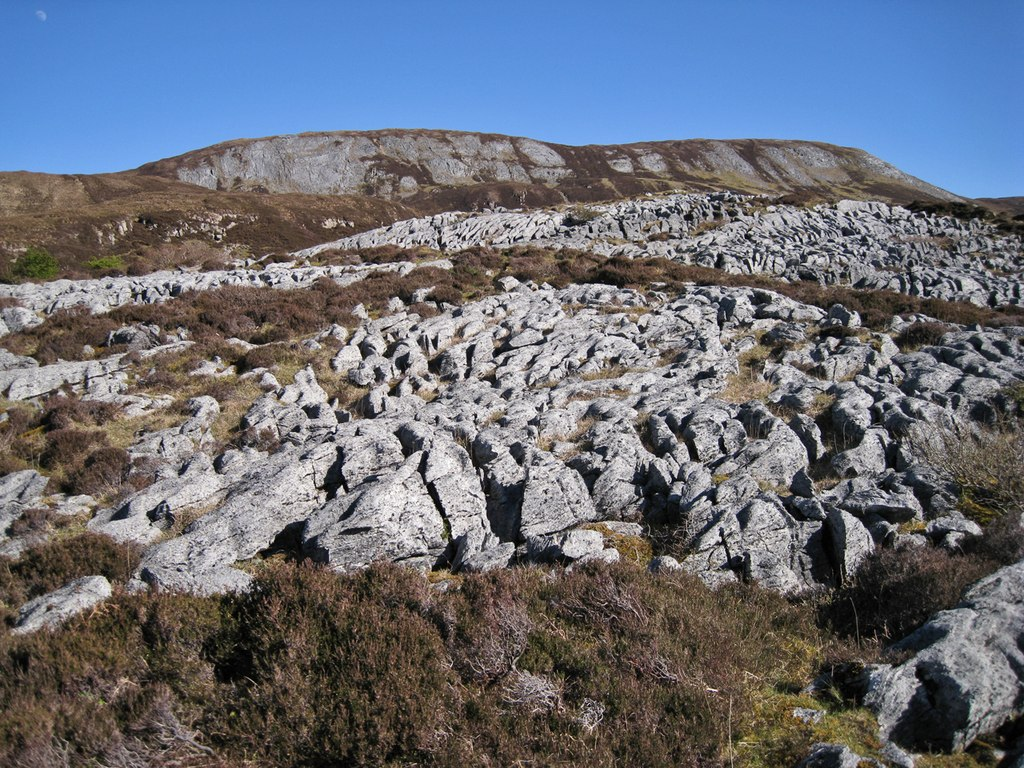
Durness Group dolomites forming a limestone pavement on Bheinn Shuardail

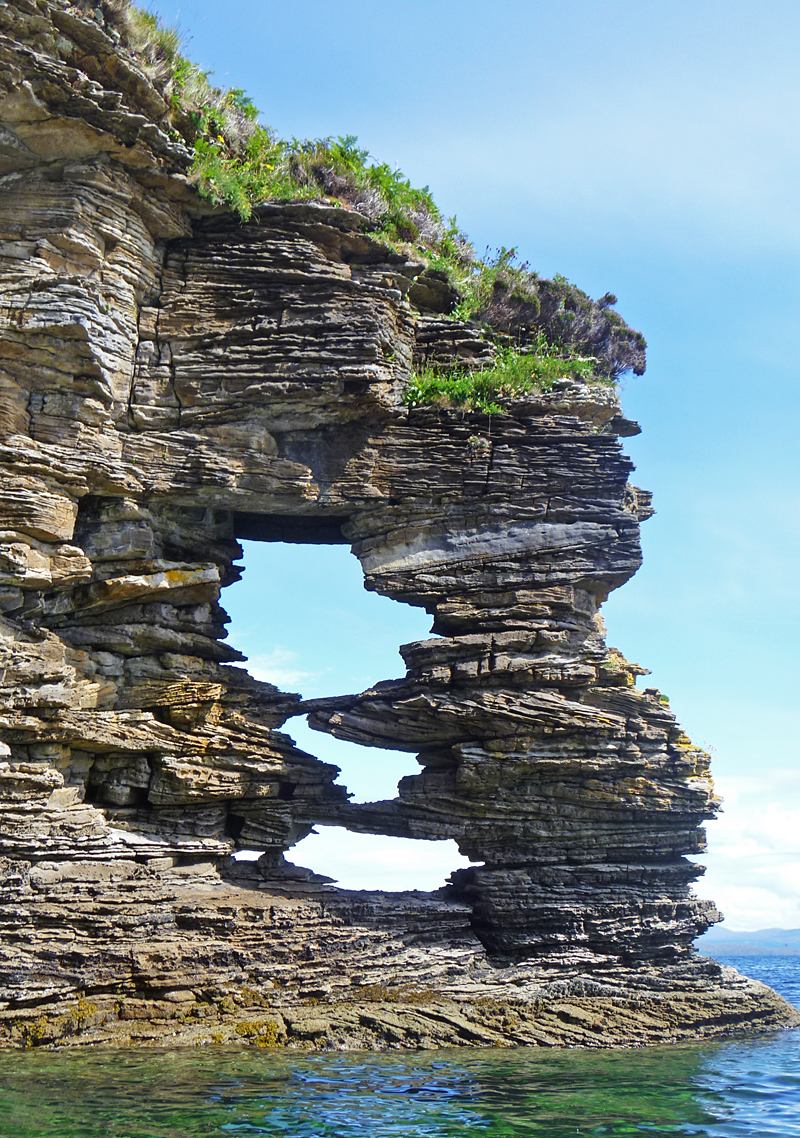
Cross-bedded Jurassic sandstones of the Bearreraig Sandstone Formation near Glasnakille, Strathaird

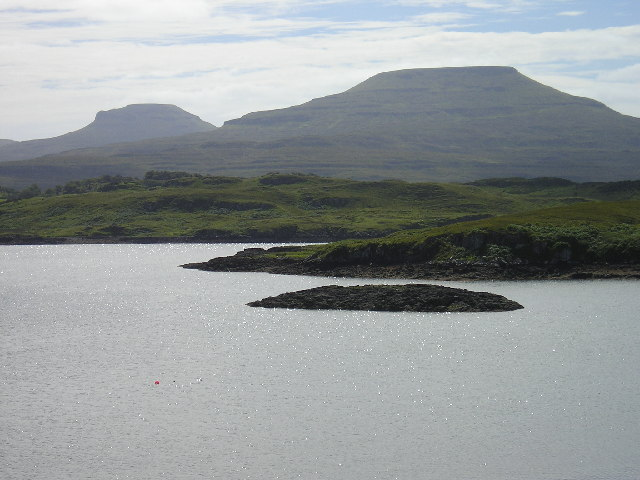
MacLeod's Tables, flat-topped hills and stepped topography from erosion of Paleocene lavas, Duirinish peninsula

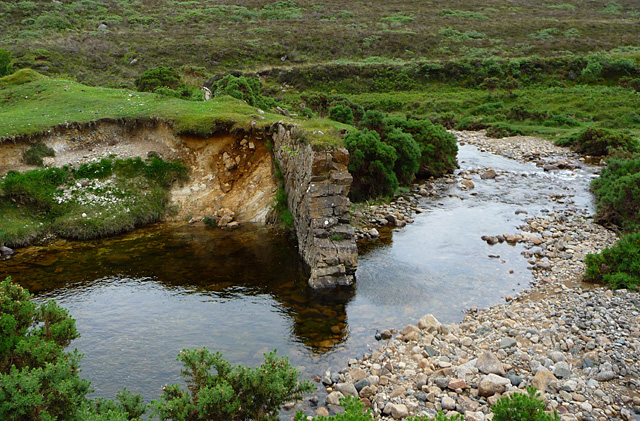
Mafic dyke near Broadford cutting Durness Group dolomite

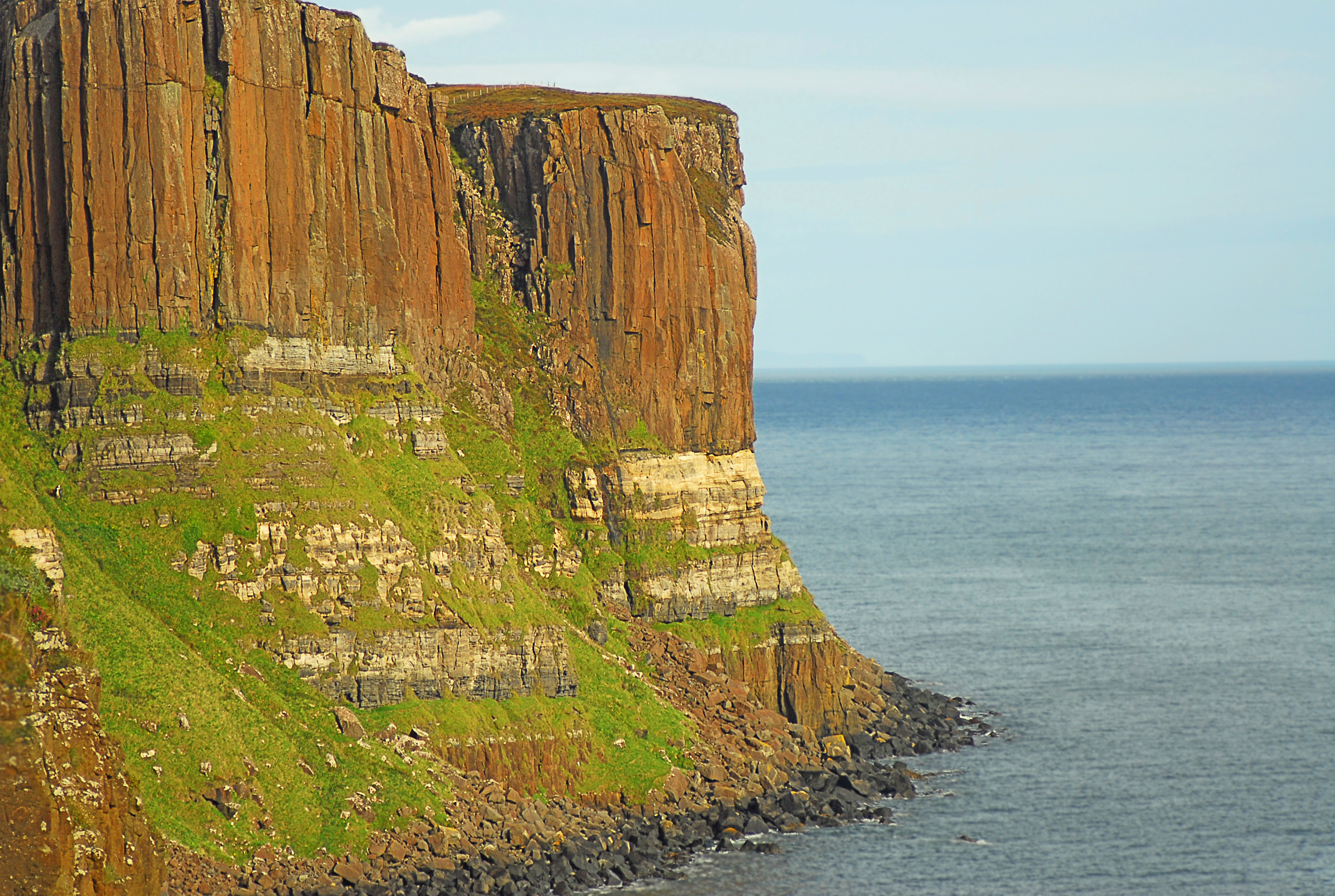
The Kilt Rock with a columnar jointed dolerite sill above Jurassic sandstones of the Valtos Sandstone Formation

The geology of the Isle of Skye in Scotland is highly varied and the island's landscape reflects changes in the underlying nature of the rocks. A wide range of rock types are exposed on the island, sedimentary, metamorphic and igneous, ranging in age from the Archaean through to the Quaternary.

== Precambrian ==
The oldest rocks found on Skye are gneisses of the Lewisian complex that were formed about 2,800 million years ago during the Archaean. These gneisses outcrop on the southeastern coast of the Sleat peninsula and were originally granitic igneous rocks. Near Tarskavaig, Neoproterozoic metasediments of the Tarskavaig Group are found above strongly deformed Lewisian rocks. The Lewisian and Tarskavaig sequences are thrust over another sequence of unmetamorphosed Neoproterozoic sediments, the Torridonian, along the Moine Thrust Zone. The Torridonian on Skye comprises two conformable sequences, the older Sleat Group and the younger Torridon Group. Both groups consist dominantly of sandstones and were deposited mainly by alluvial fans and rivers.

== Lower Palaeozoic ==
A sequence of Cambrian to Lower Ordovician sediments of the Eriboll and Durness Groups lie above the Torridonian with an angular unconformity. The Lower Cambrian Eriboll Group comprises a basal quartzite, locally with a basal conglomerate, followed by the distinctive Pipe Rock Member, a quartz arenite with white weathering skolithos trace fossils. The Pipe Rock is overlain by the Salterella Grit, a coarse sandstone, and the Fucoid Beds, a sequence of calcareous sandstone and siltstone. The overlying Durness Group comprises a series of dolomites of Upper Cambrian to Middle Ordovician in age. The lowest unit is the Ghrudaidh Formation, followed by the Eliean Dubh Formation, the Sailmhor Formation and the Sangomore Formation, all consisting of dolomites with chert. The two main exposures of Cambro-Ordovician sediments are the "Ord Window" (a gap in the Kishorn Thrust sheet through which the sequence beneath the thrust can be seen) on the northern coast of Sleat and the area between Broadford and Loch Slapin. These beds are affected by thrusting in both areas and by contact metamorphism from Palaeogene granite intrusions in the northern outcrop, locally forming marble, such as at Torrin.

== Mesozoic ==
Sedimentary rocks of Mesozoic age underlie most parts of the island north of the Sleat Peninsula. They are hidden beneath Palaeogene volcanic rocks over most of this area, being exposed only on the eastern and northern coasts of the Trotternish peninsula, on the Strathaird peninsula and between the Red Hills and Sleat. Triassic rocks of the Stornoway Formation are found near Broadford, a sequence of sandstones and conglomerates deposited by rivers. These beds are overlain by the lower Jurassic Lias Group with the Broadford Beds at the base, passing up into the Pabay Shale Formation, the Scalpay Sandstone Formation, the Portree Shale Formation and the Raasay Ironstone Formation. The sequence continues with the Lower to Middle Jurassic Bearreraig Sandstone Formation followed by Middle Jurassic Great Estuarine Group, comprising the Cullaidh Shale Formation, Elgol Sandstone Formation, Lealt Shale Formation, Valtos Sandstone Formation, Duntulm Formation, Kilmaluag Formation and the Skudiburgh Formation. The Upper Jurassic is represented by the Staffin Shale Formation. The only Cretaceous unit exposed on Skye is the Strathaird Limestone Formation, thought to be either Turonian or Campanian in age, which lies unconformably on the Jurassic and is overlain unconformably by Palaeocene lavas.

== Paleogene ==
During the Paleocene to Early Eocene Skye formed one of the main volcanic centres of the North Atlantic Igneous Province. Gently dipping lavas from the volcanoes cover most of northern Skye, giving a stepped trap type landscape. The dominant lava type is basalt, with subsidiary hawaiite and mugearite derived from silica-poor magma and minor amounts of trachyte from a silica-rich magma. Part of the magma chambers for the volcanoes are exposed at the surface as major intrusions of gabbro and granite. These coarse-grained igneous rocks are relatively resistant to erosion and now form the Cuillin hills. The Black Cuillin are formed of gabbro, which erodes to form the characteristically jagged outlines, although this is in large part due to the many minor intrusions, such as dykes and cone sheets that cut the gabbro. The Red Hills are formed of granite and have a more rounded topography. All pre-Quaternary rock types on the island are affected by a major swarm of dykes, which forms part of the North Britain Palaeogene Dyke Suite. Most of the dykes are basaltic in composition but a minority are trachytic. The dominant trend of the dykes is northwest–southeast although they are locally in part radial near the old volcanic centre. On the Trotternish peninsula, mafic magma was intruded along the bedding planes of the Jurassic sedimentary rocks beneath the lavas to form sills that are up to 90m thick. They commonly display columnar jointing, such as in the upper part of the Kilt Rock at Staffin.

== Quaternary ==
During this period the island was affected by the Quaternary glaciation, with the development of an ice cap centred on the Cuillin and Red Hills. The main ice sheet that flowed westwards from the Scottish mainland was diverted around this upland area. The island is covered by large areas of glacial till, left behind when the ice melted.

== Economic geology ==
Lower Jurassic rocks near Broadford have provided building stone for local use whilst aggregate for road construction is sourced in a Torridonian sandstone quarry near Sconser. Hornfelsed lava has been worked near Sligachan and dolerite quarried from a sill near Invertote for a similar purpose. Sand and gravel have been extracted from the raised beach deposits west of Kyleakin with local use made of gravels from the mouth of the river in Glen Brittle. The Skye Marble Company works the Cambro-Ordovician limestones at Torrin, metamorphosed through contact with the adjacent granite and gabbro intrusions. A former quarry at Strath was linked by tramroad to Broadford where the marble was exported, prior to the quarry's abandonment.

Graphite and coal are also present in small quantities, near Portree and at Loch Sligachan respectively, but neither has been economical to work. Exploratory drilling for oil has taken place within the strata of the Great Estuarine Group in the north. Peat has been worked extensively in the past for domestic fuel and indeed continues to be so in the north on a smaller scale even today. Diatomite was worked at Loch Cuithir prior to 1914, the works being connected by tramway to the coast at Invertote. Its end use was in dynamite manufacture and later as a filter and insulator.
