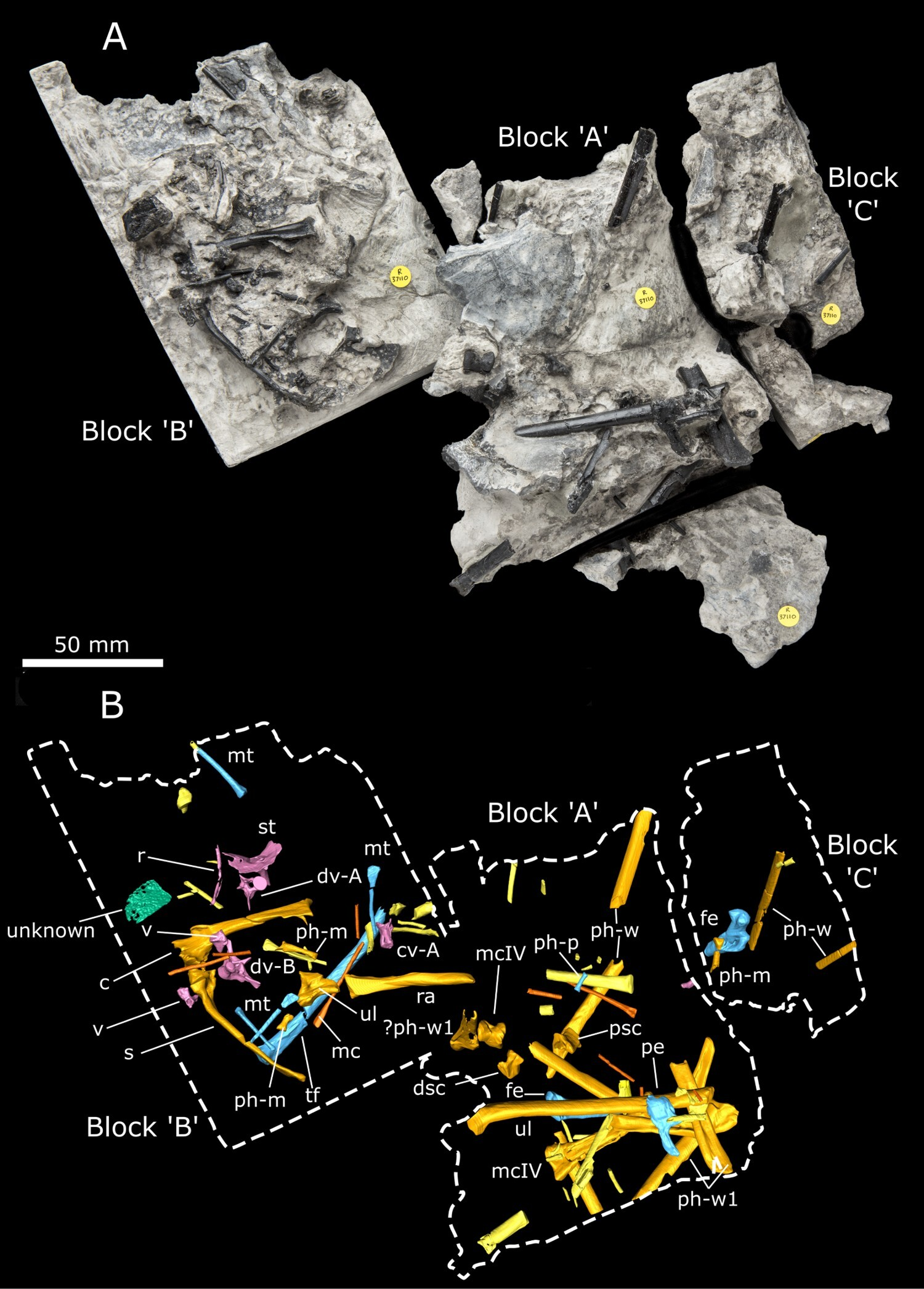
- Holotype of Ceoptera, preserved across three blocks; shown as exposed (A) and scanned to highlight fossil material (B)

Scientific classification
- Kingdom: Animalia
- Phylum: Chordata
- Order: †Pterosauria
- Clade: †Darwinoptera
- Genus: †Ceoptera; Martin-Silverstone et al., 2024

Type species
- †Ceoptera evansae Martin-Silverstone et al., 2024

= Ceoptera =

Ceoptera Temporal range: Middle Jurassic (Bathonian), 166.1 Ma

Genus of pterosaur from Scotland

Ceoptera (meaning "mist wing") is an extinct genus of darwinopteran pterosaur from the Middle Jurassic Kilmaluag Formation of Scotland. The genus contains a single species, C. evansae, known from a partial skeleton discovered in 2006 and named in 2024. It is the only pterosaur from the Kilmaluag Formation and the second pterosaur named from Scotland, after Dearc in 2022. As one of the few pterosaur skeletons known from the Middle Jurassic, its discovery contributed to understanding the early diversification of the group. Belonging to Darwinoptera, a clade intermediate between early rhamphorhynchoid and later pterodactyloid pterosaurs, it would have been a small animal with a large head and long tail. It is distinguished from all other pterosaurs by two traits: the large size of a wavy flange on its coracoid and a prominent depression on the back extension of the ilium. It would have lived in a low-salinity lagoon ecosystem with wet and dry seasons.

== Discovery and naming ==
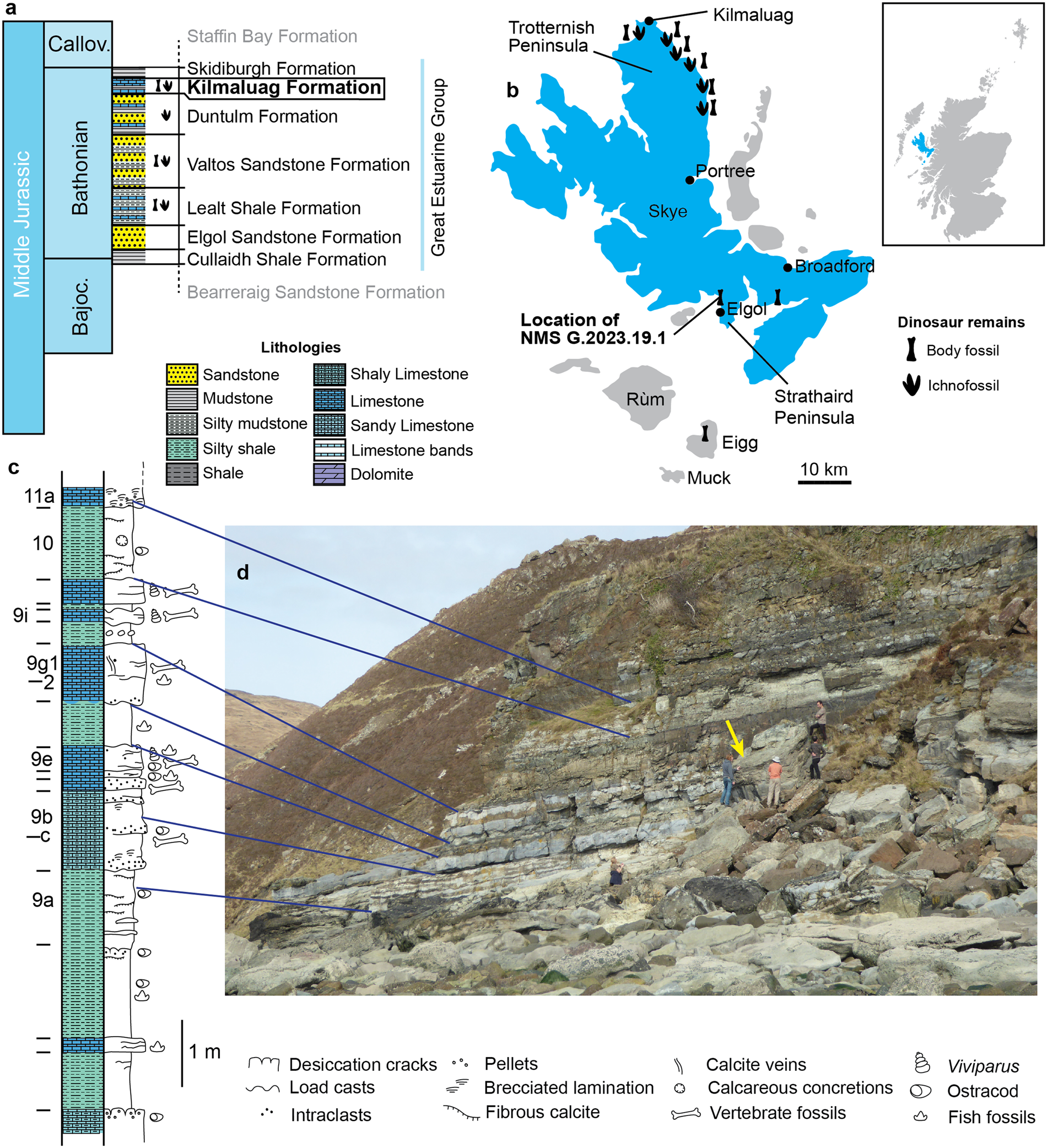
Map of the Isle of Skye, showing the geology of the Kilmaluag Formation as well as one of its outcrops. Ceoptera was found near Elgol.

In 2006, a set of rocks with protruding fossilized bones was noticed by a team of palaeontologists on Cladach a'Ghlinne, a beach north of Elgol on the Isle of Skye in Scotland. Fossils of this site are considered to be part of the Kilmaluag Formation, dated to the Middle Jurassic. The site was administered by the Scottish Natural Heritage as a Site of Special Scientific Interest, disallowing the disturbance of rocks on the cliff face, and the land was owned by a private trust. However, permission was granted by both parties for collection of the specimen as it had fallen naturally onto the beach. Care was taken in returning the specimen to the Natural History Museum in London, England, as it was very fragile. Preparation, the process of removing the fossils from the surrounding rock (the matrix), proved difficult. The limestone matrix was especially hard and the fossils within were very fragile; twelve months of acid preparation were necessary. Many remains were still embedded in the rock after this point, and CT scanning was necessary to visualize and study them.

Most knowledge about pterosaurs comes from specimens preserved in lagerstätten sites, which have an exceptional capacity for preservation, localized within the Late Jurassic and Early Cretaceous. Contrastingly, there is a paucity of remains from other points in time, especially the Early and Middle Jurassic, a critical point in pterosaur evolution. The Kilmaluag specimen, later Ceoptera, was only the fourth Middle Jurassic pterosaur known from an associated skeleton rather than an individual bone. Additionally, it is the most complete pterosaur found in the United Kingdom since Dimorphodon was discovered by Mary Anning in the early 1800s. The specimen, catalogued as NHMUK PV R37110, is preserved on three blocks, and consists of four torso vertebrae, a single tail vertebra, two other poorly preserved vertebrae of uncertain position, fragments of the sternum and pelvis, a complete scapulocoracoid, and several bones from the left forelimb and hindlimb.

The fossil material was first mentioned in a 2019 conference abstract, and later in a 2020 review of the fossil vertebrae fauna of the Kilmaluag Formation. In 2024, Elizabeth Martin-Silverstone and her colleagues described the specimen as the new genus and species Ceoptera evansae in a study published in the Journal of Vertebrate Paleontology. The generic name, "Ceoptera", combines the Scottish Gaelic word "cheò"/"ceò" (pronounced "ki-yo"), referencing the common Gaelic name for the Isle of Skye, Eilean a' Cheò (meaning "Isle of Mist"), and the Latin word "ptera", meaning "wing". The specific name, "evansae", honours British paleontologist Susan E. Evans for her scientific contributions as well as her role in introducing the team to the Skye locality and facilitating the discovery. It is only the second pterosaur named from Scotland, after Dearc in 2022.

== Description ==
Estimated size compared to a human

The Ceoptera holotype has an estimated forelimb length of 0.76 metres (2 ft 6 in) and wingspan of around 1.6 metres (5.2 ft). Many skeletal structures are fully fused, and some surfaces of the bones have a dense, smooth texture. Both of these features are characteristic of osteological maturity, so the individual was likely fully grown. As a darwinopteran, Ceoptera would likely have had a long head bearing many small pointed teeth and a prominent cranial crest. Its neck would have been relatively long compared to early pterosaurs, with prominent wings and a long, stiff tail.

=== Distinguishing traits ===
Compared to all other pterosaurs, Ceoptera is distinguished by two unique traits. The first is found in the coracoid, a shoulder bone that articulates with the sternum. In most pterosaurs, the bottom of the coracoid has a small flange on its inner edge, and in darwinopterans a similar flange is expanded on the outer edge as well, in a triangular shape. In Ceoptera, this flange is especially expanded, extending along a quarter of the coracoid and possessing a nearly rectangular shape. A similarly shaped elongate flange is present in Kunpengopterus, but that of Ceoptera ends more abruptly and has a unique wavy margin. This flange was interpreted as a likely site for the insertion of the m. sternocoracoideus muscle. The second distinguishing trait is found on the ilium, part of the pelvis. The post-acetabular process, an elongate portion of bone sticking backwards from the ilium beyond the hip socket, is overall similar in anatomy to other darwinopterans. However, the outward-facing side of the process is recessed in shape, with a small vertical ridge splitting this depression into two equal halves. In almost all other pterosaurs, this side of the bone has a flat or convex shape. Kunpengopterus also has a depression, but it is small in size by comparison. Additionally, the process as a whole is shorter and more robust than the slender, elongate processes found in Kunpengopterus and other darwinopterans.

=== Comparative anatomy ===
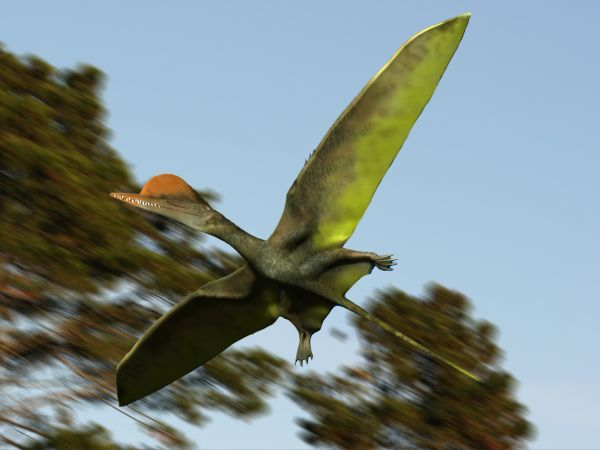
Life restoration of Darwinopterus; Ceoptera would have looked very similar

The anatomy of the forelimb is rather typical of a darwinopteran. The cristospine of the sternum, a bony crest unique to pterosaurs, is short, deep, and robust as in other darwinopterans but unlike other pterosaurs. The ulna and radius are entirely typical of Jurassic pterosaurs, and the syncarpals (fused carpal bones of the wrist) have a roughly pentagonal outline similar to those of Kunpengopterus and unlike the rectangular form in more primitive taxa. The metacarpal of the fourth finger is, like those of other darwinopterans, intermediate in length between the short finger of earlier pterosaurs and the long ones of later pterodactyloid ones. Both condyles, rounded prominences at the end of the bone, project outwards so as to form a sloping shape shared with other monofenestratan pterosaurs and unlike the flat, parallel shape seen in earlier forms like Rhamphorhynchus. Unusually, a notch on the upper surface of the finger's midsection that accommodates the fully flexed wing finger in other pterosaurs is absent, as is a muscle scar usually present in an adjacent position. The preserved finger bone of the wing is entirely ordinary for a pterosaur.

Few vertebrae are preserved, but illustrate anatomy from various portions. A well-preserved vertebra from the front of the torso has an overall typical shape for a small pterosaur. The portion of the transverse processes (long projections on either side of the vertebra) that attaches to the capitular facets (an attachment point for the ribs) extend forward onto the side of the prezygapophyses (articulations points for the preceding vertebra). Additionally, this same portion of the process extends beyond the capitular facet to form a short flange. Both of these extensions of the transverse process are absent in most pterosaurs, but they are present in the related Darwinopterus. A similar extension of the transverse process onto the prezygapophyses is seen on a vertebra preserved from the back of the torso. The known vertebra from the front of the tail is typical, with a long shape and simplistic anatomy. Developed processes pointing forward and backward from the attachment points for adjacent vertebrae indicate the presence of elongate filiform processes extending along the tail, typical of many long-tailed pterosaurs.

The hindlimb of Ceoptera is, likewise, similar to its relatives. Most of the femur is similar to other pterosaurs; the upper portion has a well developed greater trochanter projecting upwards, unlike more primitive pterosaurs but similar to darwinopterans. The femoral neck is elongate and constricted, distinct from the typical short and stout neck seen in the femurs of other darwinopterans. The tibia and fibula are, contrastingly, similar to those of other darwinopterans in every respect. The one preserved foot claw is elongate, with a recurved shape. The flexor tubercle, a portion of the underside of the claw allowing it to be flexed, has a geometric (rather than round) shape and a flat bottom edge that gently slopes into the main portion of the claw. This anatomy is not unique to Ceoptera, but is distinctive of Darwinoptera and distinct from other pterosaurs.

== Classification ==
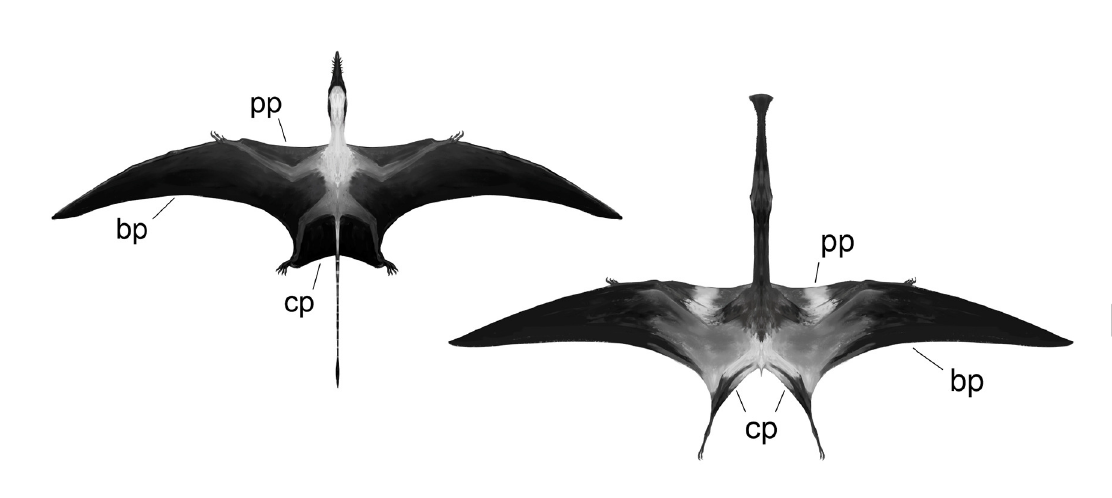
Darwinopterans like Ceoptera exhibit intermediate morphology to rhamphorhynchoid (left) and pterodactyloid (right) pterosaurs.

The 2024 study naming Ceoptera performed a phylogenetic analysis to test its relationships to other pterosaurs, using a dataset built upon those of various prior studies. This analysis found it to belong to the group Darwinoptera, though this grouping was only weakly supported. Nonetheless, its identity as a darwinopteran was considered strongly supported due to the strong resemblance of its skeletal anatomy to other members of that group in several respects, such as the bulbous tip of the scapula and proportions of the metacarpals in the wing. Internal relationships within Darwinoptera were not resolved, but morphological diversity within the group was considered evidence for the existence of various subgroups that remain presently unrecognized. The discovery of Ceoptera and other darwinopterans around the world demonstrates the success of the group, originally only known from several species discovered in the Tiaojishan Formation of China.

As a darwinopteran, Ceoptera was a close relative of the pterodactyloid radiation that included most known pterosaurs, with intermediate anatomy between pterodactyloids and earlier "rhamphorhynchoid" pterosaurs. They are united with pterodactyloids in the group Monofenestrata, most notably characterized by the fusion of their nasal and antorbital fenestrae into a single large hole in the skull. Due to the consistent anatomy seen in these pterosaurs, the authors supported the existence of Darwinoptera as a natural grouping, an offshoot whose intermediate nature was inherited from a common ancestor with pterodactyloids. Other studies, however, find that this anatomical form is merely a transitional stage in pterosaur evolution, and consider these taxa to be successively distant relatives of Pterodactyloidea. As a rare Middle Jurassic pterosaur, Ceoptera existed at a key point in the diversification of darwinopterans and other pterosaurs. Combined with other lines of evidence emerging in the 2010s and 2020s, its discovery indicates that many groups of pterosaurs emerged in the Early Jurassic and had achieved a high level of ecological diversity by the Middle Jurassic, despite the paucity of fossils.

The results of the 2024 analysis are shown below:

- - Rhamphorhynchidae
  - Monofenestrata
    - Darwinoptera
      - Changchengopterus
      - Kunpengopterus
      - Wukongopterus
      - Darwinopterus
      - Kryptodrakon
      - Cuspicephalus
      - Allkaruen
      - Ceoptera
    - - "Rhamphodactylus"
      - Pterodactyloidea

== Palaeoecology ==
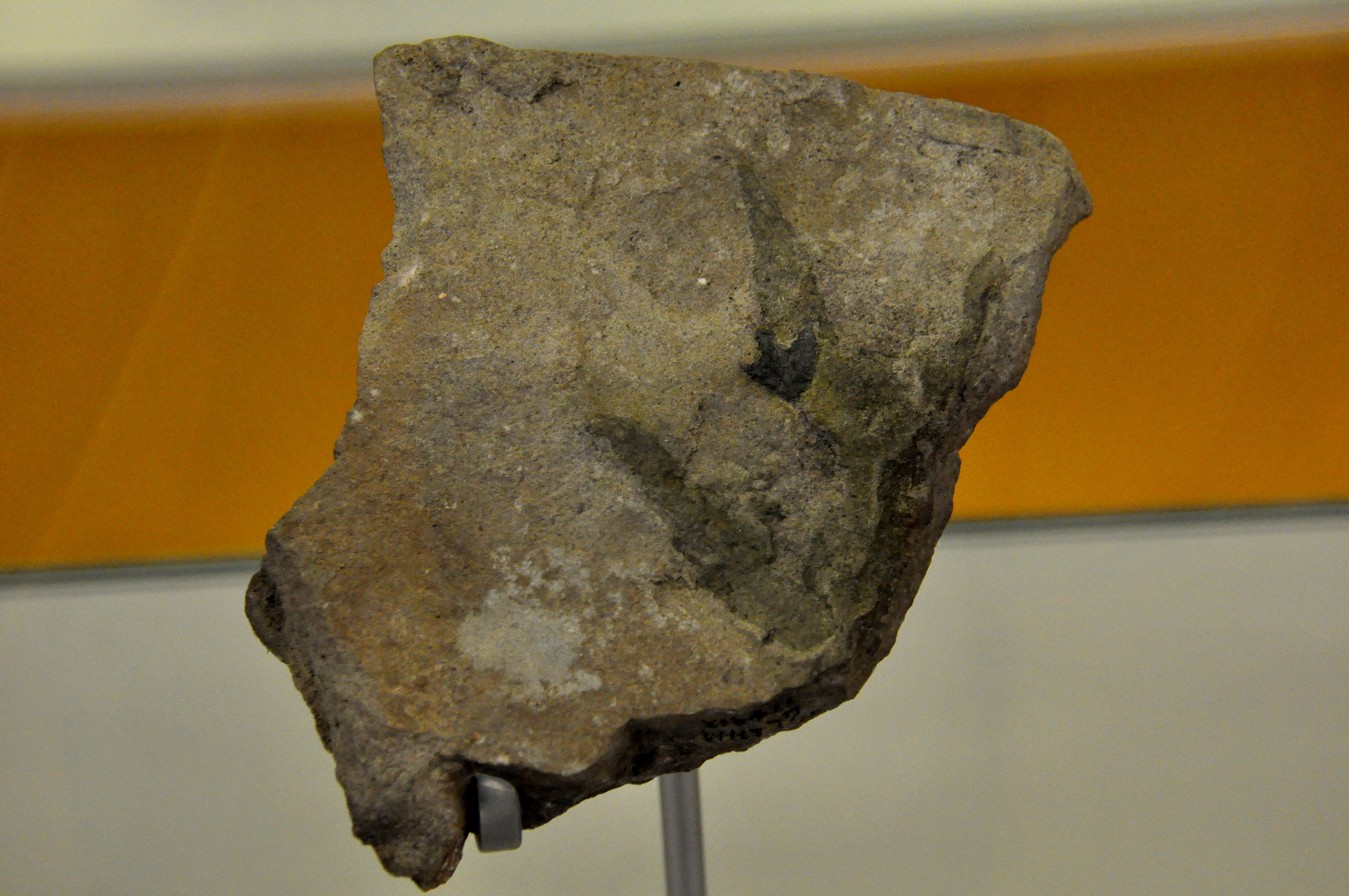
Fossilized set of footprints from theropod dinosaurs that lived alongside Ceoptera

Known remains of Ceoptera are found in the Kilmaluag Formation, part of the Great Estuarine Group and dating to the Bathonian age of the Jurassic period, around 166.1 million years ago. Specifically, Ceoptera is found in the vertebrate beds of the southern, argillaceous mud and limestone-dominated section of the formation. During the Bathonian, the formation would have represented a freshwater or low-salinity closed lagoon ecosystem near the ocean fed by meteoric waters, with sediments delivered by surrounding rivers. The lagoon would have been shallow, expanding and drying out with the passage of wet and dry seasons. During these dry periods, mudflats would have been exposed. The preservation of vertebrate fossils in these beds is characterized by a distinct black colour, as seen in Ceoptera. This ecosystem is distinct from that found in other sections of the Great Estuarine Group, which are saltwater in nature. As represented in a higher layer, the lagoon would eventually more permanently dry out into an exposed supralittoral ecosystem which was significantly more barren than the vertebrate beds.

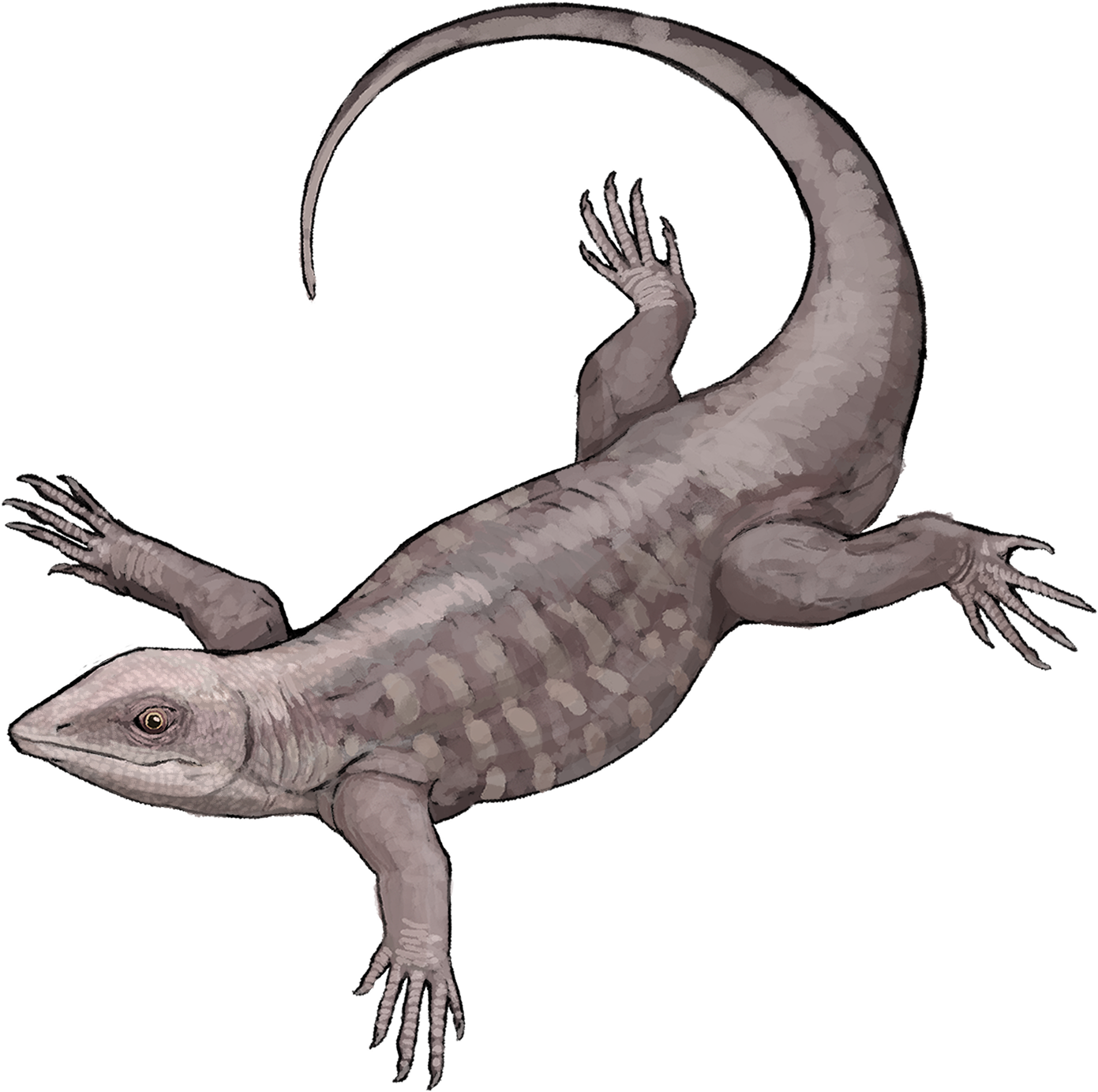
Animals in the Kilmaluag Formation environment such as the common Marmoretta, pictured, demonstrate ecological ties to the Forest Marble Formation.

A rich fauna is preserved at Cladach a'Ghlinne and other sites within the formation. This fauna is similar to that of the Forest Marble Formation, a formation of similar age found in England. Plant fossils, contrastingly, are extremely rare within the Kilmaluag Formation, mostly restricted to gymnosperm pollen and pteridophyte spores. Invertebrates are best represented by extremely abundant freshwater ostracods such as Darwinula and Theriosynoecum. Other invertebrates include conchostracans Anthronesteria and Pseudograpta, the gastropod Viviparus, and the bivalve Unio. Burrows indicate the presence of shrimps or crabs. Insect fossils are not common, but include beetles. Fish include the hybodonts Acrodus and Hybodus, pycnodonts, the semionotiform Lepidotes, amiiforms, and a sarcopterygian that may be a type of coelacanth. Amphibians include the karaurid Marmorerpeton wakei, a very primitive form of salamander, as well as the albanerpetontid Anoualerpeton; frogs are seemingly absent.

Many reptiles are found in the formation, with the early lepidosauromorph Marmoretta being the most common. Lizards found in the formation include Bellairsia gracilis, Balnealacerta, and Parviraptor. Rhynchocephalians appear to be absent. Aquatic reptiles include the choristodere Cteniogenys, and turtle remains are common, including Eileanchelys, one of the earliest aquatic turtles. Crocodylomorphs are represented by atoposaurids and goniopholids. Dinosaurs are primarily known from tracks, indicating the presence of megalosaurid theropods and large eusauropods. A neornithischian dinosaur, possibly the oldest known ornithopod, is represented by a partial skeleton. Mammals include the tritylodontid Stereognathus ooliticus, the docodonts Borealestes serendipitus, Borealestes cuillinensis, and Krusatodon kirtlingtonensis, the morganucodont Wareolestes rex, the cladotherian Palaeoxonodon ooliticus, and Phascolotherium. Multituberculates and haramiyidans notably appear absent.
