= Duntulm Formation =

- Stratigraphic range: Bathonian
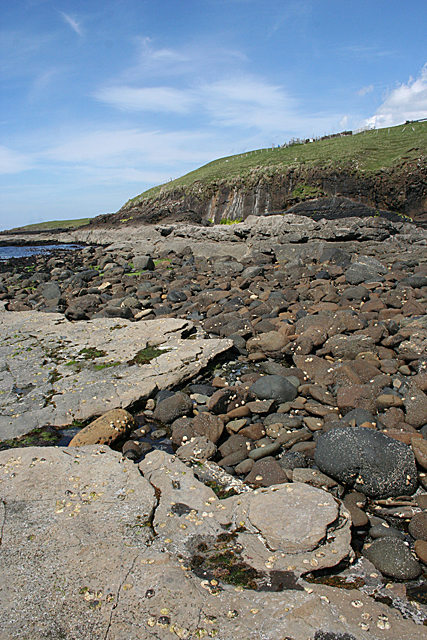
- Exposures of limestone of the Duntulm Formation on the foreshore near Duntulm, Skye
- Type: Formation
- Unit of: Great Estuarine Group
- Underlies: Kilmaluag Formation
- Overlies: Valtos Sandstone Formation
- Thickness: Up to 55 m

Lithology
- Primary: Oyster beds
- Other: Sandstone, Siltstone, Shale

Location
- Region: Scotland
- Country: United Kingdom

Type section
- Named for: Duntulm

The Duntulm Formation is a sedimentary geologic formation deposited in the Inner Hebrides, Scotland. The formation was previously known as the 'Lower Ostrea Beds', and dates to the Bathonian stage of the Middle Jurassic. The formation is noted for its highly fossiliferous oyster beds, which compose of the species Praeexogyra hebridica. The sedimentary sequence also forms part of the Great Estuarine Group.

== Geology ==
The Duntulm Formation is noted for its oyster beds, composed of a shale or limestone matrix, and can range up to 2 m in thickness. The sedimentary sequence is also composed of fine sandstones, siltstones, and shales. The sediment is constrained to the Bathonian stage based on palynomorph assemblages of dinoflagellate and green algae. Additional constraint to the mid-late Bathonian is achieved with the bivalve Praeexogyra.

The type section for the formation is exposed as a wave cut platform at Cairidh Ghlumaig (Duntulm), northwest Trotternish on the Isle of Skye. The exposure is noted for its lithological variety and accessibility. The first seven beds of the section denote the Upper Valtos Sandstone Formation, noted for an abundance of Neomiodon and Unio bivalves and an absence of oysters until bed 7 - the base of the Duntulm Formation. The remaining 48 beds mainly represent a marine-brackish palaeoenvironment, composed of algal and oyster beds. The maximum thickness of the formation at Duntulm is approximated at 55 m, while 30 m is exposed.

Additional exposures of the Duntulm Formation in northern Skye (the Sea of the Hebrides basin) occur at An Corran (Staffin Bay), Kilmaluag Bay, and Loch Bay on Waternish.

In the Inner Hebrides basin, the formation is much thinner and occurs on Strathaird, the Isles of Eigg and Muck.

== Palaeoenvironment ==
The sediment sequence records marine-brackish conditions within a transgressive lagoonal complex, succeeding the freshwater influence previously recorded in the Valtos Sandstone Formation. Four lithofacies are noted and each record different depositional regimes. Lithofacies 1-2 consists of argillaceous carbonate muds accumulated in the lee of oyster banks. Lithofacies 3 represents algal marshes composed of supralittoral carbonate. Lithofacies 4 is composed of sandstones deposited by prograding deltas. The basin wide transition from marine-brackish to freshwater conditions is represented in lithofacies 5 - composed of terrestrial spores and pollen in muds and sands. During this time, the lagoonal complex became increasingly closed from marine influence and mudflat - as characterised in the succeeding Kilmaluag Formation.

== Fossils ==
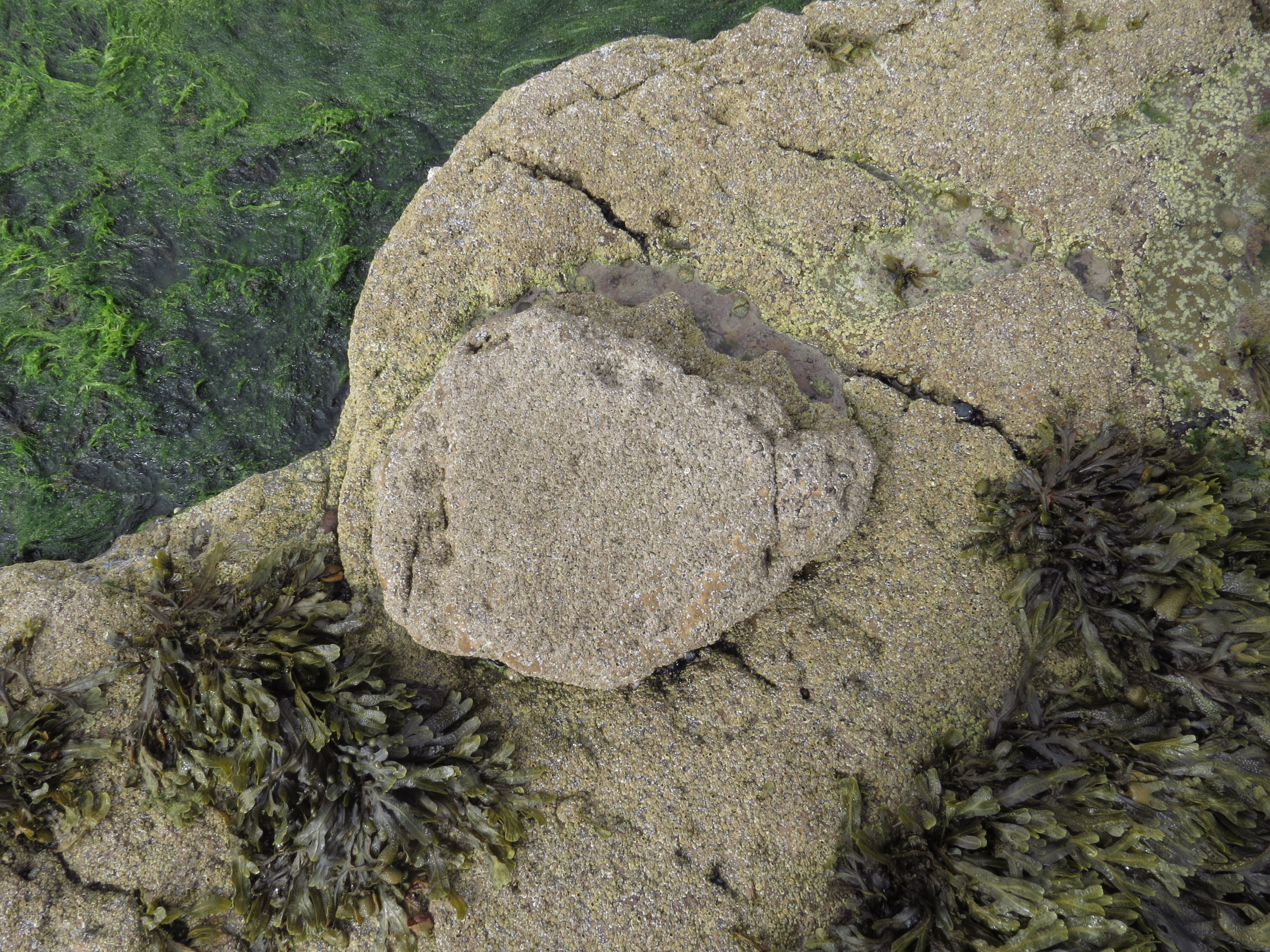
Sauropod track with four digits at Cairidh Ghlumaig (Duntulm).

The Duntulm Formation is known for preserving a variety of vertebrate and invertebrate fossils. Indeed, its constraint as a marine/brackish palaeoenvironment was through the identification of marine bivalves, including Praeexogyra, Cuspidaria, and Modiolus. Marine gastropods include Procerithium and Globularia. Lithofacies 2 features infilled burrow traces including Diplocraterion, Thalassinoides and Monocraterion. Fish remains and sharks teeth and fin spines are also common. Occasional carbonised plant remains can be found throughout the formation. A full assemblage description and interpretation can be found in Andrews and Walton (1990).

A series of Breviparopus sauropod tracks and narrow gauge trackways were identified in beds 9b, 34, and 35 in the type section at Cairidh Ghlumaig in 2015. The tracks are characterised by their large size, and quadrupedal sequence of ovular shaped (anteriorly widening) pes and crescent shaped manus footprints. The tracks are thought to have been impressed while the substrate was submerged. The greatest concentration of tracks occur on a wave cut platform composed of bed 35 and are exposed during low tides. The clearest tracks preserve four digits. Most however resemble sequential hyporelief rock pools. A single possible ornithopod track was also recorded.

== See also ==
- List of fossiliferous stratigraphic units in Scotland
