= Dearcmhara =

Dearcmhara Temporal range: Middle Jurassic, 183.0–168.4 Ma

Scientific classification
- Kingdom: Animalia
- Phylum: Chordata
- Class: Reptilia
- Order: †Ichthyosauria
- Node: †Neoichthyosauria
- Genus: †Dearcmhara; Brusatte et al., 2015

Type species
- †Dearcmhara shawcrossi Brusatte et al., 2015

Extinct genus of reptiles

Dearcmhara (pronounced "jark vara"; Scottish Gaelic: "marine lizard") is an extinct genus of ichthyosaurian marine reptile from the early to mid-Jurassic period around 170 million years ago, known from fossil remains found on the island of Skye in Scotland. The type species is Dearcmhara shawcrossi. Fragmentary fossil remains of the animal were discovered by an amateur fossil hunter in 1959 and were subsequently donated to a museum, but it was not until 2014 that a scientific research project determined that the fossils belonged to a previously unknown species.

== Description ==
Dearcmhara was a basal neoichthyosaurian ichthyosaur, measuring around 14 feet (4.3 m) in length. It lived in a warm, shallow sea in what is now the north-west of Scotland. Much of Skye was underwater at the time and was joined with the rest of the UK as part of a large island between the landmasses that were later to become Europe and North America. The type species, Dearcmhara shawcrossi, was discovered in an extremely incomplete state with only four bones remaining from the animal's skeleton; however, this has been sufficient to allow researchers to identify unique features that are not seen on other ichthyosaurs. The bones come from the back, tail and forefin, with the upper fin bone or humerus (holotype GLAHM 152378/1) providing strong evidence of the creature being a new species. It possesses a large triangular projection and a deep pit where muscles and ligaments were probably attached.

== History ==
The type species was discovered in sediments of the Bearreraig Sandstone Formation in Bearreraig Bay on the Trotternish peninsula of Skye in 1959 by fossil hunter Brian Shawcross, after whom it is named, and who donated it to the Hunterian Museum in Glasgow. The genus name Dearcmhara is Scottish Gaelic for "marine lizard" and marks one of the few occasions when a fossil has been given a Gaelic name. It is pronounced "jark vara" (IPA: d͡ʒɐrk vɐrɐ). Although the fossil was collected decades ago, it was not identified until a research project brought together experts from the University of Edinburgh, National Museums Scotland, the Hunterian Museum, Scottish Natural Heritage and the Staffin Museum on Skye to study fossil fragments found on the island over a 50-year period. It is the first Scottish species of ichthyosaur to have been discovered and represents an extremely rare type of find. The discovery was announced on 11 January 2015 in a study published in the Scottish Journal of Geology and the fossils were displayed in a one-day exhibition at the Our Dynamic Earth visitor attraction in Edinburgh on 18 January 2015.

Writing in The Conversation, the study's lead author Stephen Brusatte commented that while it was inevitable that the press had compared the find to the mythical Loch Ness Monster, Dearcmhara was "much more interesting". He noted the crucial role that Brian Shawcross had played in donating the fossil rather than keeping or selling it, a fate which had befallen many other Jurassic fossils from Scotland, and appealed to amateur collectors to follow Shawcross's example in donating their finds to science.
