= Lealt Shale =

Geologic formation in Skye, Scotland

Lealt Shale Formation
- Stratigraphic range: Bathonian
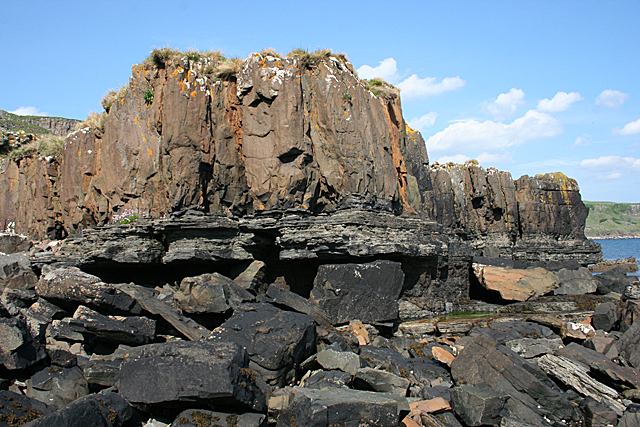
- Thinly bedded limestones of the Lealt Shale formation overlain by Paleogene lava
- Type: Geological formation
- Unit of: Great Estuarine Group
- Sub-units: Kildonnan Member, Lonfearn Member
- Underlies: Valtos Sandstone Formation
- Overlies: Elgol Sandstone Formation
- Thickness: Between 45 and 50 m

Lithology
- Primary: Mudstone
- Other: Limestone

Location
- Region: Europe
- Country: Scotland
- Extent: Inner Hebrides

Type section
- Named for: Lealt, Skye
- Named by: Harris and Hudson
- Location: Cliffs east of Lonfearn (partial), Coastal exposure 2.5 km north of Kildonnan, Eigg (partial)
- Year defined: 1980
- Thickness at type section: Lonfearn: 26 to 30 m (partial) Kildonnan: 23 m (partial)

The Lealt Shale Formation is a Middle Jurassic geologic formation in Scotland. Fossil ornithopod, theropod and stegosaur tracks, a theropod dinosaur tooth and the pterosaur Dearc have been reported from the formation. The lithology consists of silty fissile mudstones with subordinate thin limestones.

== Fossil content ==
Color key: Taxon / Reclassified taxon / Taxon falsely reported as present / Dubious taxon or junior synonym / Ichnotaxon / Ootaxon / Morphotaxon	Notes; Uncertain or tentative taxa are in small text; ~~crossed out~~ taxa are discredited.

=== Dinosaurs ===
==== Theropoda ====
Theropod of the Lealt Shale Formation
Genus	Species	Location	Stratigraphic position	Material	Notes	Images
Theropoda Indet.	Indeterminate			Tooth		

=== Pterosaurs ===
Pterosaurs of the Lealt Shale Formation
Genus	Species	Location	Stratigraphic position	Material	Notes	Images
Dearc	D. sgiathanach				A angustinaripterin rhamphorhynchid	

=== Fish ===
Fishes of the Lealt Shale Formation
Genus	Species	Location	Stratigraphic position	Material	Notes	Images
Archaeotolithus	A. eiggensis				A ray-finned fish	
Archaeotolithus	A. invernizziae				A ray-finned fish	
Leptolepis	L. flexuosus				a leptolepid fish	
Leptolepis	L. skyensis				a leptolepid fish	

== See also ==
- List of dinosaur-bearing rock formations
  - List of stratigraphic units with ornithischian tracks
    - Ornithopod tracks
