= Lealt, Skye =

Coordinates: 57.56826°N 6.17237°W

Lealt: Scottish Gaelic: An Leathallt
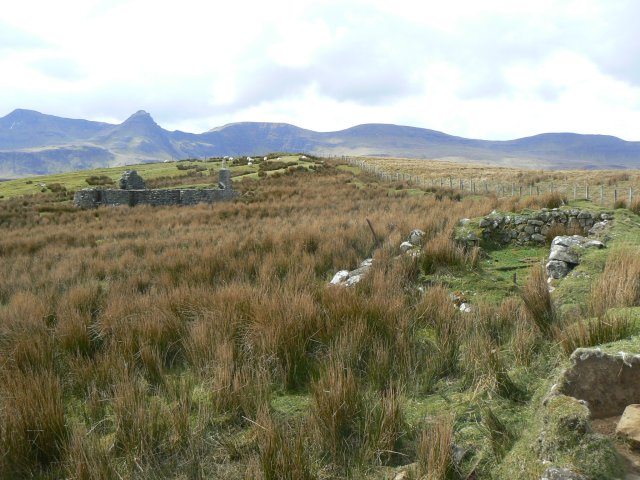

- Location within the Isle of Skye
- OS grid reference: NG505608
- Council area: Highland
- Country: Scotland
- Sovereign state: United Kingdom
- Postcode district: IV51 9
- Police: Scotland
- Fire: Scottish
- Ambulance: Scottish

Lealt (Scottish Gaelic: An Leathallt) is a crofting township, on the western coastline of the Sound of Raasay on the Trotternish peninsula of Skye, in the Highlands of Scotland and the council area of Highland. The Lealt River which gives its name to Lealt, passes through on the way to the Sound of Raasay.

The name "Lealt" means "Stream with one high bank".

== See also ==
- Lealt Valley Diatomite Railway.
- Ewan Crawford (2003). Isle of Skye Lealt Valley Diatomite Railway. publisher not identified.
