= Great Estuarine Group =

Geologic formation in Scotland

- Stratigraphic range: Bajocian-Bathonian 170–164 Ma
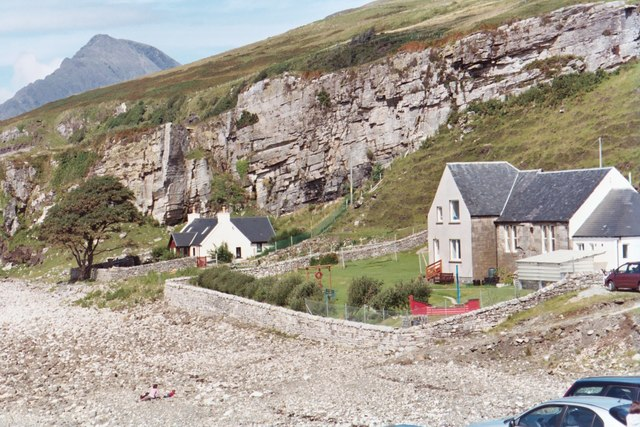
- Sandstones of the Elgol Sandstone Formation, exposed in the cliff behind Elgol school
- Type: Group
- Unit of: Hebrides Basin
- Sub-units: Skudiburgh Formation; Kilmaluag Formation; Duntulm Formation; Valtos Sandstone Formation; Lealt Shale Formation; Elgol Sandstone Formation; Cullaidh Shale Formation
- Underlies: Staffin Bay Formation or Skye Lava Group
- Overlies: Bearreraig Sandstone Formation
- Thickness: circa 33–289 m (108–948 ft)

Lithology
- Primary: Mudstone
- Other: Sandstone

Location
- Region: Scotland
- Country: United Kingdom
- Extent: Inner Hebrides

The Great Estuarine Group is a sequence of Middle Jurassic sedimentary rocks deposited in the Inner Hebrides of Scotland. The sedimentary sequence was originally named the 'Great Estuarine Series' by geologist John Wesley Judd in 1878. Sedimentary outcrops occur on Skye, Raasay, Eigg and Muck. It comprises a series of shales, clays, silts, mudstones, and sandstones deposited in two drainage basins: the Inner Hebrides basin and the Sea of the Hebrides basin. The sediments are equivalent in age to the Inferior and Great Oolite Groups found in southern England.

The Group overlies the Garantiana Mudstone of the 'Bearreraig Sandstone Formation' and is itself overlain by rocks of the 'Skye Lava Group', erupted during the Palaeocene.

The lowermost (and hence oldest) unit of the Great Estuarine Group is the 'Cullaidh Shale Formation'. Overlying this is the 'Elgol Sandstone Formation', the type locality of which is to be found at the village of Elgol on Skye. These sandstones are interpreted as being deltaic in origin.

Above the sandstone is the 'Lealt Shale Formation', a unit in which fossils of creatures which lived in brackish lagoons abound. These include mussels, sharks and plesiosaurs. The discovery of the first plesiosaur was made in 1844 by the geologist Hugh Miller. The 'Kildonnan Member' of the Lealt Shale Formation contains stromatolites and various microfossils such as dinoflagellates and acritarchs. The succeeding 'Lonfearn Member' consist of shales and thin shelly and oolitic limestones with conchostracan fossils. It has also yielded dinosaur footprints.

At the next stratigraphic level the 'Valtos Sandstone Formation' represents a further series of deltaic sandstones. Large calcareous concretions commonly occur within this formation. They are post-depositional in origin with individual nodules reaching more than a metre in diameter and cutting across the bedding. The 'Duntulm Formation' succeeds the Valtos Formation and is in turn succeeded by the 'Kilmaluag Formation', and then by the youngest unit of the Great Estuarine Group, the 'Skudiburgh Formation'.

== See also ==
- Geology of Scotland
- Hebridean terrane
