= Angus Bellairs =

British herpetologist

Angus d'Albini Bellairs (11 January 1918 – 26 September 1990) was a British professor of vertebrate morphology and a specialist in herpetology. He published a landmark two volume The Life of Reptiles (1970).

Bellairs studied at Stowe School, Queens' College, Cambridge, and University College London. He joined the Royal Army Medical Corps in 1942 and served in north Africa, the Middle East, Italy, India and Burma. On his travels he took an interest in natural history and collected numerous specimens. After military service he obtained a comparative anatomy position in the department of human anatomy at the London Hospital Medical College, followed by similar positions at Cambridge University and St. Mary's Hospital Medical School. In 1970 he became Professor of Vertebrate Anatomy in the University of London. Some of his major contributions to herpetology where on the function of Jacobson's organ, the egg tooth of snakes, and the snout of the gharial.

The fossil lizard Bellairsia was named after him by Professor Susan E. Evans.
