= Lealt Valley Diatomite Railway =

Former railway line in Scotland

Overview
- Headquarters: Invertote
- Locale: Isle of Skye, Scotland
- Dates of operation: 1890–1915
- Successor: Abandoned

Technical
- Track gauge: 2 ft (610 mm)
- Length: 2 3/4 mi (4.4 km)

The Lealt Valley Diatomite Railway was a 2 ft (610 mm) narrow gauge tramway on the Isle of Skye, Scotland, which ran parallel with the River Lealt.

Work was underway to lay the tramway in March 1889. At the opening, the line was worked by gravity – the line being on a falling gradient – and manpower. Later, the line began the use of a steam locomotive.

The western end of the line was at Loch Cuithir, where diatomite - known locally as Cailc (Scottish Gaelic for chalk) - was taken out from the lochbed and dried on wire nets. The seaward terminus had warehouses on the cliff-top at Invertote. At the base of the cliff was a factory where the diatomite was kiln dried, ground and calcined. The line was extended from the factory onto a pier into the Sound of Raasay. Diatomite was also got from Loch Valerain and transported by aerial ropeway to Staffin Bay. During its existence, the Skye Diatomite Company extracted 2000 tons of diatomite.

From Invertote, the diatomite was transferred by skiff, onto puffer boats, waiting in the bay, and shipped across to the mainland. The diatomite was turned into kieselguhr which was mixed with nitroglycerine by Nobel Industries, at Ardeer, to make dynamite.
