= Kilmaluag Formation =

Geologic formation in Scotland

- Stratigraphic range: Bathonian; ~167.4–166.5 Ma
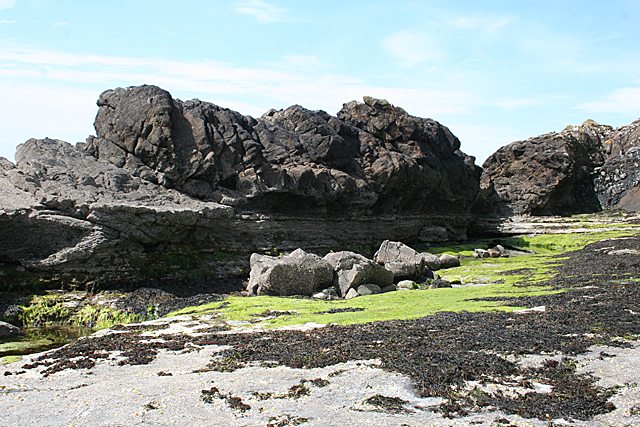
- Sediments of the Kilmaluag Formation overlain by Paleogene lava on the Isle of Skye
- Type: Formation
- Unit of: Great Estuarine Group
- Underlies: Skudiburgh Formation
- Overlies: Duntulm Formation
- Thickness: Up to 25 m (82 ft)

Lithology
- Primary: Calcareous mudstone, limestone

Location
- Coordinates: 57.2°N 6.1°W
- Approximate paleocoordinates: 46.4°N 4.2°E
- Country: Scotland
- Extent: Throughout Inner Hebrides, including Isle of Skye, Isle of Muck, and Isle of Eigg

Type section
- Named for: Kilmaluag Bay in the North of Skye
- Kilmaluag Formation (the United Kingdom) Kilmaluag Formation (Scotland)

The Kilmaluag Formation is a Middle Jurassic geological formation in Scotland. It was formerly known as the Ostracod Limestone for preserving an abundance of fossil freshwater/low salinity ostracods. Gastropods, bivalves, trace fossil burrows, and vertebrate fossil remains have also been recorded from the formation. Vertebrate fossils include fish, crocodylomorphs, mammals, small reptiles, amphibians, theropod and sauropod dinosaurs and pterosaurs.

== Geology ==
The Kilmaluag Formation was deposited during the Bathonian stage ~167 million years ago and is part of the Great Estuarine Group. Like other rock formations within the Great Estuarine Group, the Kilmaluag Formation is composed of a series of fine grained sandstones, silts, mudstones, and dolomitised limestones. The sediments were deposited in a freshwater influenced low salinity closed lagoonal palaeoenvironment subject to lagoon margin transgressions and regressions. During regressions, sediment abandonment ensued and is indicated by the deposition of dolomitised limestones, in which large desiccation cracks can be observed. In contrast, during transgressions, sediment influxes and increases in water depth led to the deposition of finer grained silts and muds. Occasional shoreline conditions are indicated by rippled sandstones.

The Kilmaluag Formation is divided into two facies: the clastic facies deposited in the Sea of the Hebrides basin of northern Skye, and argillaceous limestone facies present in the Inner Hebrides basin, present on the Straithaird peninsula, Isles of Eigg and Muck.

== Fossils ==
In many beds, freshwater gastropods and bivalves can be found, including Viviparus and Unio, and freshwater ostracods such as Darwinula and Theriosynoecum.

Many vertebrate fossils have been recorded from the argillaceous facies of Straithaird since the 1970s, when the first mammal fossil were found by Michael Waldman. He returned with fellow palaeontologist Robert Savage and named two new species from the area: the Docodont Borealestes serendipitus, and the tritylodontid, Stereognathus hebridicus (although S. hebridicus is now thought to be a junior synonym to S. ooliticus). Many other fossils are found in the Kilmaluag, including members of other Mesozoic mammal groups, turtles, reptiles, and amphibians. Notable vertebrate fossil recent discoveries in the Kilmaluag Formation include Palaeoxonodon ooliticus and Wareolestes rex. A notable dinosaur find includes the tooth of a sauropod dinosaur. The most recent scientifically pre-published find includes a pterosaur found in 2006.

Comparisons between the Kilmaluag Formation and other British and global Middle Jurassic localities suggest that the fauna represented is globally significant, due to the scarcity of similarly aged sediments. The fauna is a subset of the animals represented in the Forest Marble Formation in England, but fossils in the Kilmaliag Formation are substantially more complete.

Exposures of the Kilmaluag Formation are protected by law as SSSIs (Site of Special Scientific Interest) and under the new Scottish NCO (Nature Conservation Order), thus no public collection is permitted. Most fossils found to date are held in the collections of the National Museum of Scotland.

== Vertebrate paleobiota ==
=== Amphibians ===
Amphibians
Genus	Species	Location	Stratigraphic position	Material	Notes	Images
cf. Anoualerpeton	cf A. priscum			Pair of articulated premaxilla	Albanerpetontid	
Marmorerpeton	M. wakei	Cladach a'Ghlinne		Several partial skeletons	Salamander	
Caudata	Indeterminate	Cladach a'Ghlinne			Referred to as "Kirtlington 'Salamander A'"	

=== Turtles ===
Turtles
Genus	Species	Location	Stratigraphic position	Material	Notes	Images
Eileanchelys	E. waldmani	Cladach a'Ghlinne		Partial skull and association of 5-6 individuals with skull and shell material.	A mesochelyidian	
Testudines	Indeterminate	Cladach a'Ghlinne				

=== Lepidosauromorphs ===
Lepidosauromorphs
Genus	Species	Location	Stratigraphic position	Material	Notes	Images
Balnealacerta	B. silvestris			"right dentary, partial right maxilla and a partial right prefrontal"	Squamate	
Bellairsia	B. gracilis			"dentary and parts of other bones scattered on a slab"	Stem-squamate	
Breugnathair	B. elgolensis	Elgol		Partial skull and skeleton	A parviraptorid pan-squamate of uncertain affinities	
Marmoretta	M. oxoniensis	Cladach a'Ghlinne		Partial associated skeleton	Stem-lepidosauromorph	
cf. Paramacellodus	Indeterminate	Cladach a'Ghlinne			Squamate	
Parviraptor	Indeterminate	Cladach a'Ghlinne			Squamate	
	Indeterminate	Cladach a'Ghlinne			Distinct from other taxa known from the British Bathonian, new gen et sp indet.	

=== Choristoderes ===
Choristoderes
Genus	Species	Location	Stratigraphic position	Material	Notes	Images
Cteniogenys	Indeterminate	Cladach a'Ghlinne		Partial skull		

=== Dinosaurs ===
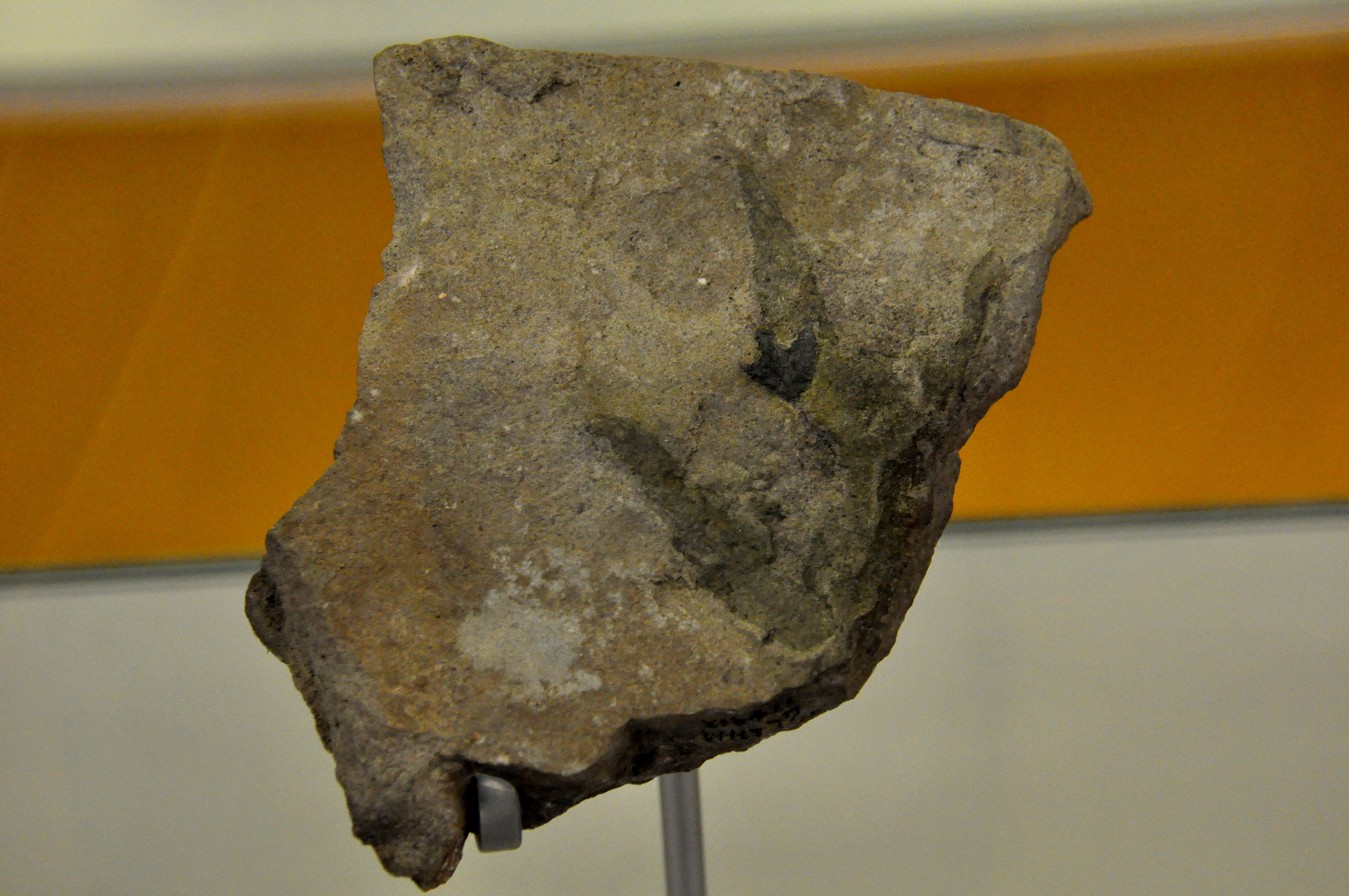
Fossilised dinosaur footprints in a Kilmaluag Formation rock from the Isle of Skye

Dinosaurs
Genus	Species	Location	Stratigraphic position	Material	Notes	Images
Cerapoda?	Indeterminate	S. Carn Mor		Fragments including a possible dorsal vertebral neural arch, a dorsal rib, a partial right ilium, and a possible limb bone	The first and most complete dinosaur skeleton found in Scotland, potentially the oldest known ornithopod body fossil	
Eusauropoda	Indeterminate	Cladach a'Ghlinne		Tooth		

=== Pterosaurs ===
Pterosaurs
Genus	Species	Location	Stratigraphic position	Material	Notes	Images
Ceoptera	C. evansae	Cladach a'Ghlinne		A partial skeleton		

=== Mammaliamorphs ===
Mammaliamorphs
Genus	Species	Location	Stratigraphic position	Material	Notes	Images
Borealestes	B. serendipitus	Cladach a'Ghlinne		Toothed jaw fragments, referred partial skeleton	Docodont	
Borealestes	B. cuillinensis	Cladach a'Ghlinne		Partial skeleton	Docodont	
Krusatodon	Indeterminate	Cladach a'Ghlinne		Molar	Docodont	
Palaeoxonodon	P. ooliticus	Cladach a'Ghlinne		Three partial left dentaries	Amphitheriid	
Stereognathus	S. ooliticus	Cladach a'Ghlinne		Partial toothed jaw, isolated teeth	Tritylodont	
Wareolestes	W. rex			Partial left dentary	Morganucodont	

== See also ==
- List of fossiliferous stratigraphic units in Scotland
