= Kilmaluag =

Coordinates: 57.681°N 6.317°W

Kilmaluag: Scottish Gaelic: Cill Moluaig
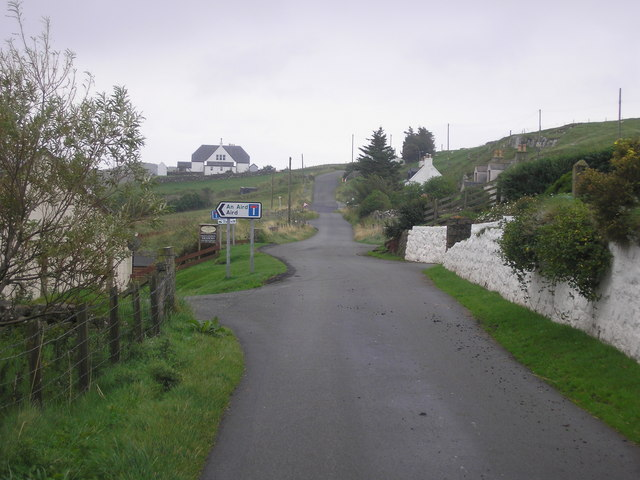
- The Main Street through Kilmaluag

- Location within the Isle of Skye
- OS grid reference: NG426738
- Council area: Highland
- Lieutenancy area: Ross and Cromarty
- Country: Scotland
- Sovereign state: United Kingdom
- Post town: PORTREE
- Postcode district: IV51
- Dialling code: 01470 552
- Police: Scotland
- Fire: Scottish
- Ambulance: Scottish
- UK Parliament: Ross, Skye and Lochaber
- Scottish Parliament: Ross, Skye and Inverness West

Kilmaluag (Scottish Gaelic: Cill Moluaig, meaning St. Moluag's Cell, Church or Chapel) is a township made up of several small settlements on the most northerly point of the Trotternish peninsula of the Isle of Skye, Scotland. Kilmaluag is within the parish of Kilmuir.

The settlements within the township include Balmacqueen (Gaelic: Macqueen's Place), Kendram (Gaelic: Head of the Ridge), Connista (Norse: High Farm), Aird (Gaelic: Point or Promontory) and Solitote (Gaelic: Ruin Hill).

The Kilmaluag also gives its name to a Jurassic geological formation, the Kilmaluag Formation. This limestone and sandstone formation is Bathonian in age, and outcrops in the harbour of the village and in several other locations on Skye.
