= Skudiburgh Formation =

- Stratigraphic range: Late Bathonian
- Type: Geological formation
- Unit of: Great Estuarine Group
- Underlies: Staffin Bay Formation
- Overlies: Kilmaluag Formation
- Thickness: up to 16 metres (50 ft)

Lithology
- Primary: Mudstone
- Other: Siltstone, Sandstone

Location
- Region: Europe
- Country: Scotland
- Extent: Inner Hebrides

The Skudiburgh Formation is a geological formation in Scotland and the uppermost unit of the Great Estuarine Group, it is late Bathonian in age. The lithology largely consists of red and grey-green silty mudstone with lenticular siltstone and sandstone beds.
