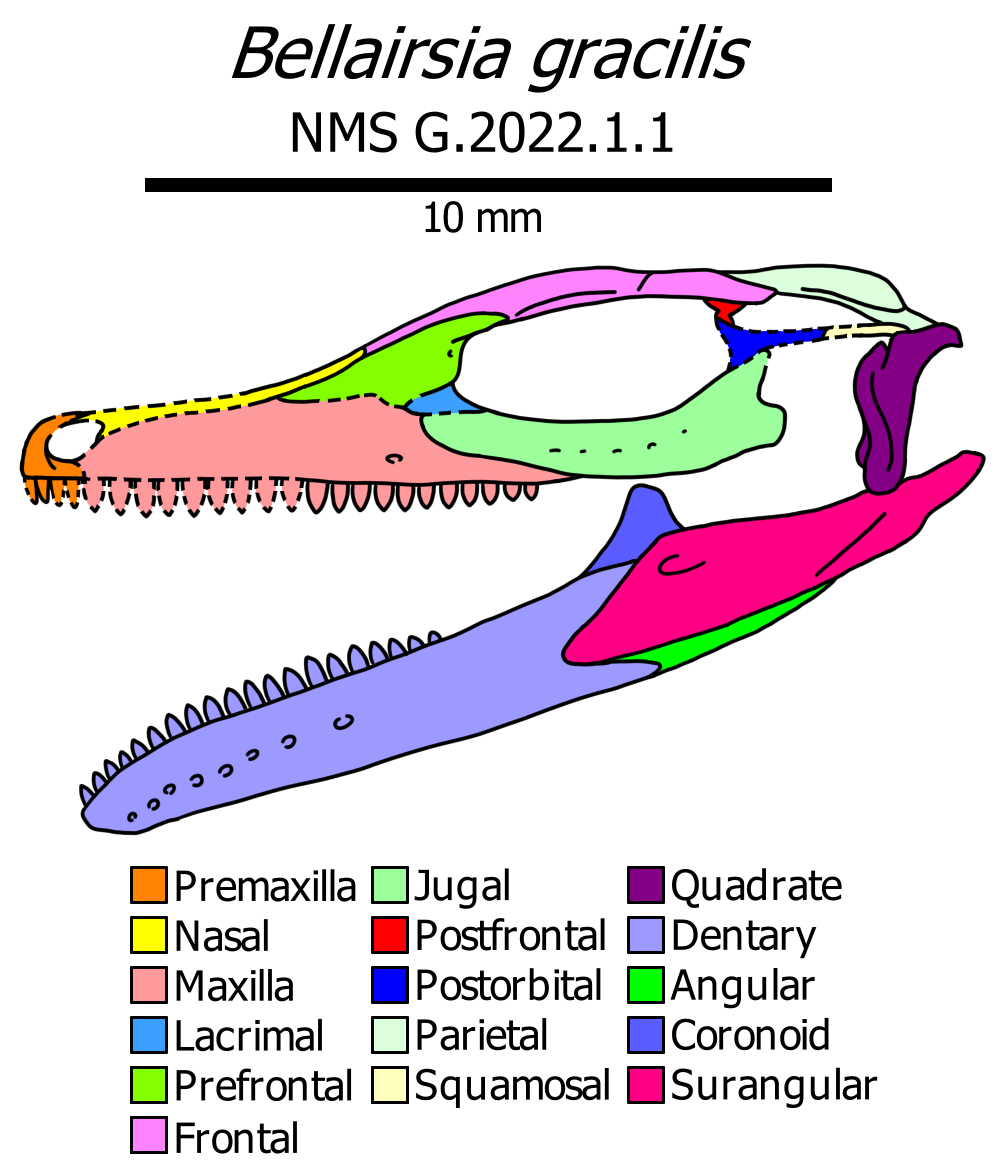
- Skull diagram

Scientific classification
- Kingdom: Animalia
- Phylum: Chordata
- Class: Reptilia
- Order: Squamata
- Genus: †Bellairsia; Evans, 1998
- Species: †B. gracilis

Binomial name
- †Bellairsia gracilis Evans, 1998

= Bellairsia =

Bellairsia Temporal range: Middle Jurassic Bathonian

Extinct genus of reptiles

Bellairsia is an extinct genus of stem-squamate known from a single species, Bellairsia gracilis, from the Middle Jurassic (Bathonian) of England and Scotland. It is amongst the oldest squamates known. It was originally described in 1998 by Susan E. Evans from disarticulated individual bones, including the holotype dentary, collected from the Forest Marble Formation in Kirtlington Quarry, Oxfordshire, England. It was named in honor of British herpetologist and vertebrate anatomist Angus Bellairs. In 2022, a partial 70% complete skeleton was described from the equivalently aged Kilmaluag Formation of the Isle of Skye, Scotland. The partial skeleton had an estimated snout-vent length of around 6–7 centimetres (2.4–2.8 in). While originally considered a member of Scincomorpha, the 2022 study recovered it to be a stem-group squamate, with the phylogeny recovering it as part of a weakly supported clade also containing Huehuecuetzpalli and Oculudentavis.

== Classification ==
Phylogeny after Talanda et al. (2022):

- - Archosauromorpha
  - Lepidosauromorpha
    - - †Paliguana
      - †Megachirella
      - - †Fraxinisaura
        - †Marmoretta
    - crown-Lepidosauria
      - †Sophineta
      - Rhynchocephalia
      - - - †Bellairsia
          - - †Oculudentavis
            - †Huehuecuetzpalli
        - crown-Squamata
