= Elgol Sandstone Formation =

- Stratigraphic range: Bajocian–Bathonian
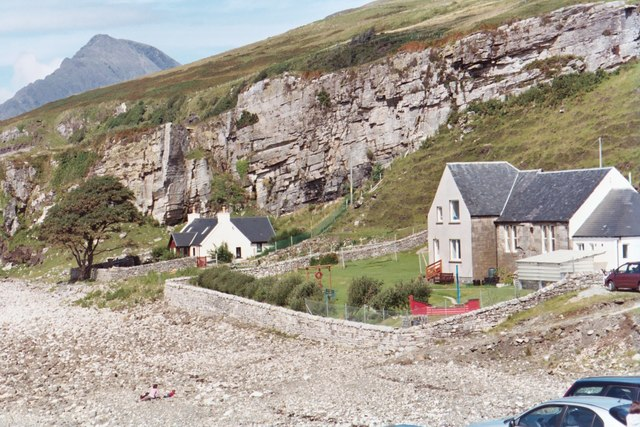
- Sandstones of the Elgol Sandstone Formation, exposed in the cliff behind Elgol school
- Type: Geological formation
- Unit of: Great Estuarine Group
- Underlies: Lealt Shale Formation
- Overlies: Cullaidh Shale Formation
- Thickness: up to 32 metres (100 ft)

Lithology
- Primary: Sandstone
- Other: Mudstone

Location
- Region: Europe
- Country: Scotland
- Extent: Inner Hebrides

Type section
- Named for: Elgol
- Named by: Harris and Hudson
- Location: Port Na Cullaidh
- Year defined: 1980
- Thickness at type section: 22 metres (70 ft)

The Elgol Sandstone Formation is a geological formation in Scotland, part of the Great Estuarine Group. It spans the transition between the Bajocian and Bathonian stages of the Middle Jurassic. The lithology consists of clay rich sandstone interbedded with silty fissile mudstone.
