= Cullaidh Shale Formation =

- Stratigraphic range: Bajocian
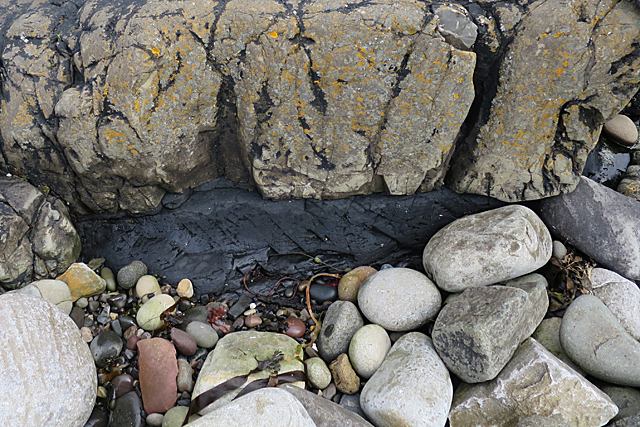
- Black shale of the Cullaidh Shale Formation overlain by a sill
- Type: Geological formation
- Unit of: Great Estuarine Group
- Underlies: Elgol Sandstone Formation
- Overlies: Bearreraig Sandstone Formation
- Thickness: up to 6 metres (20 ft)

Lithology
- Primary: Shale, Mudstone
- Other: Sandstone

Location
- Region: Europe
- Country: Scotland
- Extent: Inner Hebrides

The Cullaidh Shale Formation is a geological formation in Scotland, and the lowermost unit of the Great Estuarine Group. It is Bajocian in age. The lithology largely consists of organic rich mudstone and shales, including oil shale developed near the base.
