= Valtos Sandstone Formation =

Sandstone formation in Scotland

- Stratigraphic range: Middle Jurassic Bathonian
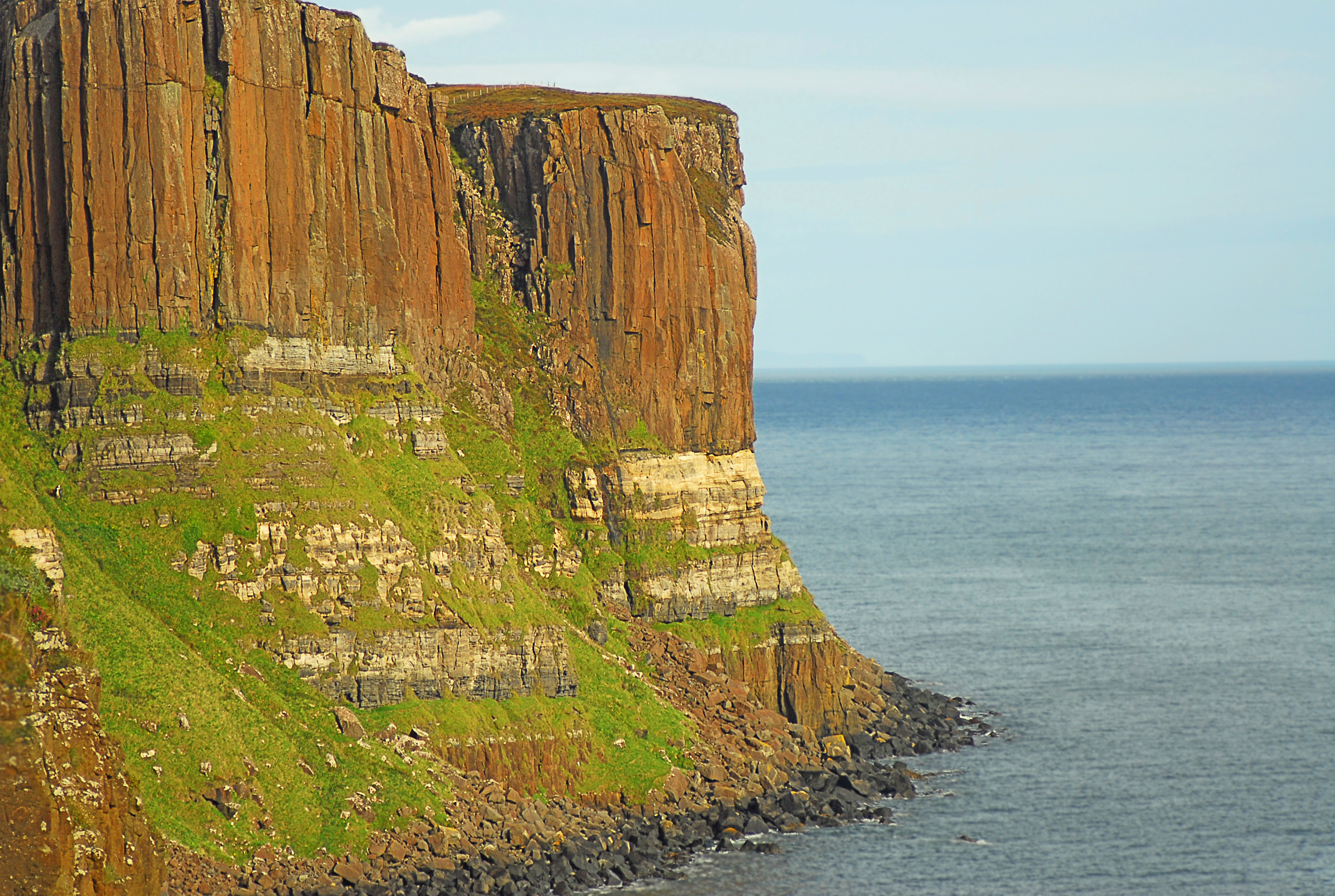
- Sandstones of the Valtos Sandstone Formation outcropping between two dolerite sills, the Kilt Rock, Trotternish, Skye
- Type: Formation
- Unit of: Great Estuarine Group
- Underlies: Duntulm Formation
- Overlies: Lealt Shale Formation
- Thickness: up to 120 m

Lithology
- Primary: sandstone
- Other: limestone, mudstone

Location
- Region: Scotland
- Country: United Kingdom
- Extent: Inner Hebrides

Type section
- Named for: Valtos, Skye
- Named by: Harris and Hudson
- Location: Cliffs between Valtos and Mealt Falls
- Year defined: 1980
- Thickness at type section: 95 m

The Valtos Sandstone Formation is a Middle Jurassic (Bathonian) formation found in the Inner Hebrides of Scotland. It is the thickest member of the Great Estuarine Group. The lithology consists of sets of approximately 6 metre thick cross bedded sandstone, capped by thin shelly limestones containing bivalves of the genus Neomiodon Dinosaur remains are among the fossils that have been recovered from the formation, although none have yet been referred to a specific genus.

Archosaurs of the Valtos Formation
Genus	Species	Location	Stratigraphic position	Abundance	Notes	Images
Theriosuchus	Indeterminate			Dentary fragment		
Sauropoda	Indeterminate	Near Valtos		Limb bone, rib, caudal vertebra, Tooth		
Stegosauria	Indeterminate	Isle of Eigg		Fibula		
Theropoda	Indeterminate			Teeth and caudal vertebra	Vertebra likely to belongs to a coelurosaur	

== See also ==
- List of dinosaur-bearing rock formations
  - List of stratigraphic units with indeterminate dinosaur fossils
- List of fossiliferous stratigraphic units in Scotland
