= Bearreraig Sandstone Formation =

Geological formation in Scotland

- Stratigraphic range: Toarcian-Bajocian; ~182–171 Ma
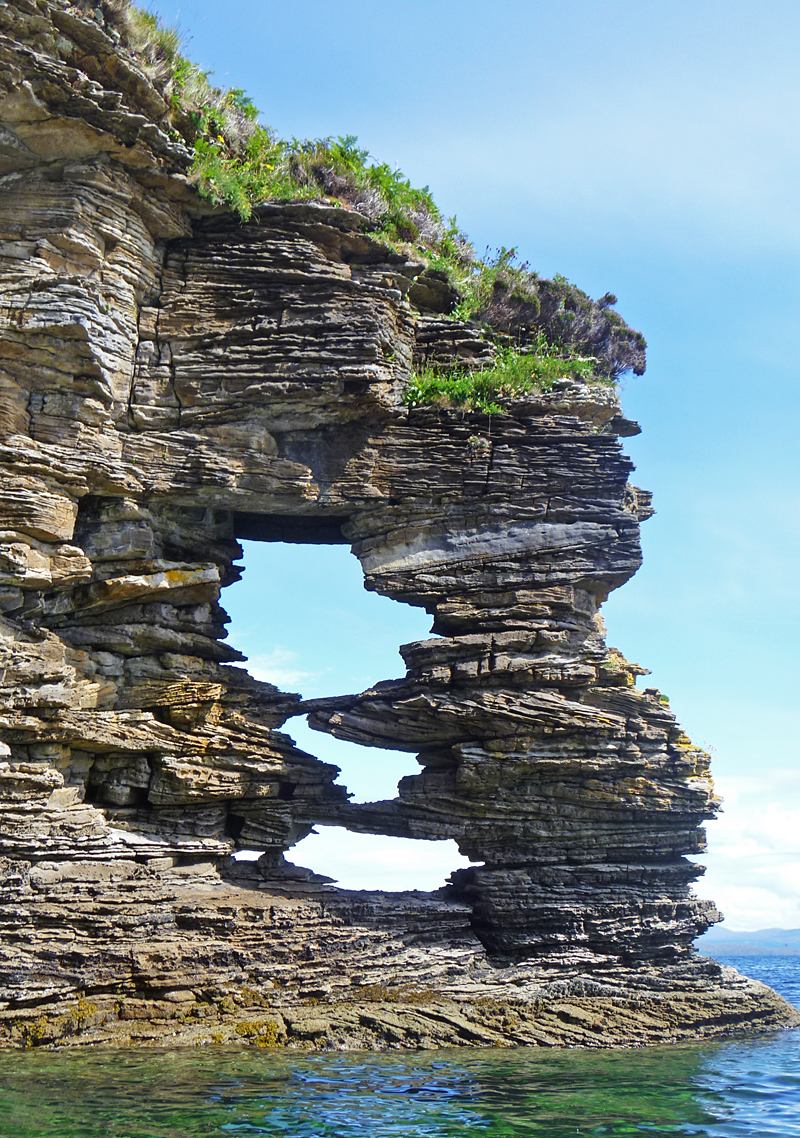
- Cross-bedded sandstone of the Bearrereaig Sandstone Formation near Glasnakille, Skye
- Type: Formation
- Unit of: Hebrides Basin
- Sub-units: Druim An Fhurain Sandstone Member, Garantiana Mudstone Member
- Underlies: Cullaidh Shale Formation
- Overlies: Raasay Ironstone Formation
- Thickness: up to 488 m (1,601 ft)

Lithology
- Primary: Calcareous sandstone
- Other: Limestone, mudstone

Location
- Coordinates: 57.5°N 6.1°W
- Approximate paleocoordinates: 45.9°N 4.6°E
- Region: Hebrides Basin, Inner Hebrides, Ardnamurchan, Scotland
- Country: United Kingdom

Type section
- Named for: Bearreraig Bay
- Bearreraig Sandstone Formation (the United Kingdom) Bearreraig Sandstone Formation (Scotland)

The Bearreraig Sandstone Formation is a geological formation in Scotland. It preserves fossils dating back to the lower to middle parts of the Jurassic period (Toarcian–Bajocian). The remains of the proximal portion of a right ulna and radius of an indeterminate thyreophoran dinosaur are known from the formation. The ichthyosaur Dearcmhara is also known from the formation.

== See also ==
- List of fossiliferous stratigraphic units in Scotland
