= Muck, Scotland =

Island of the Small Isles, in Scotland, United Kingdom

Muck
Eilean nam Muc (Gaelic)
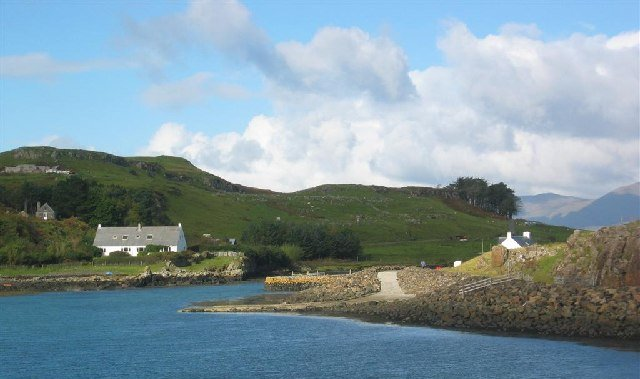
- Port Mòr, from the harbour

Location
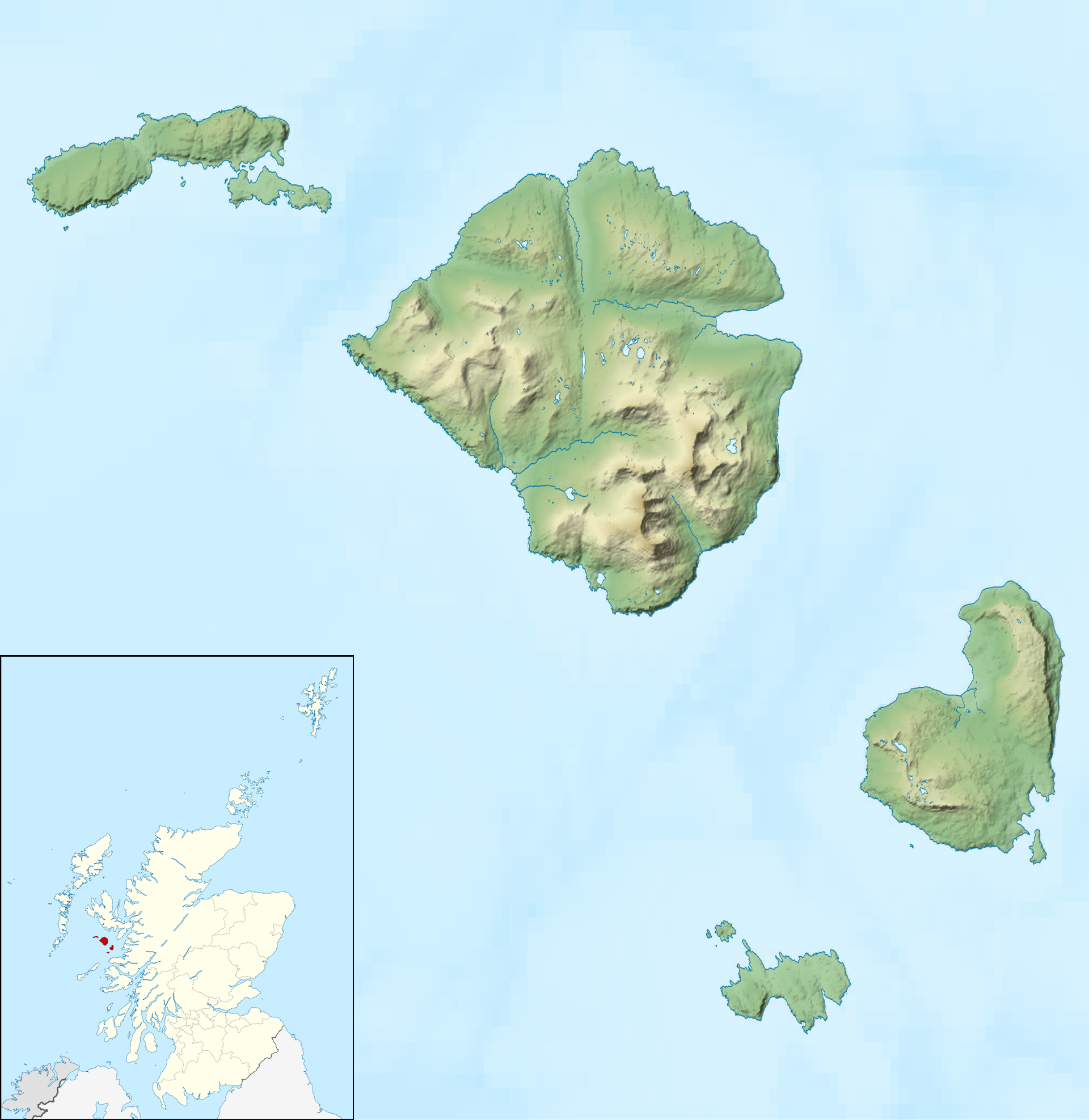
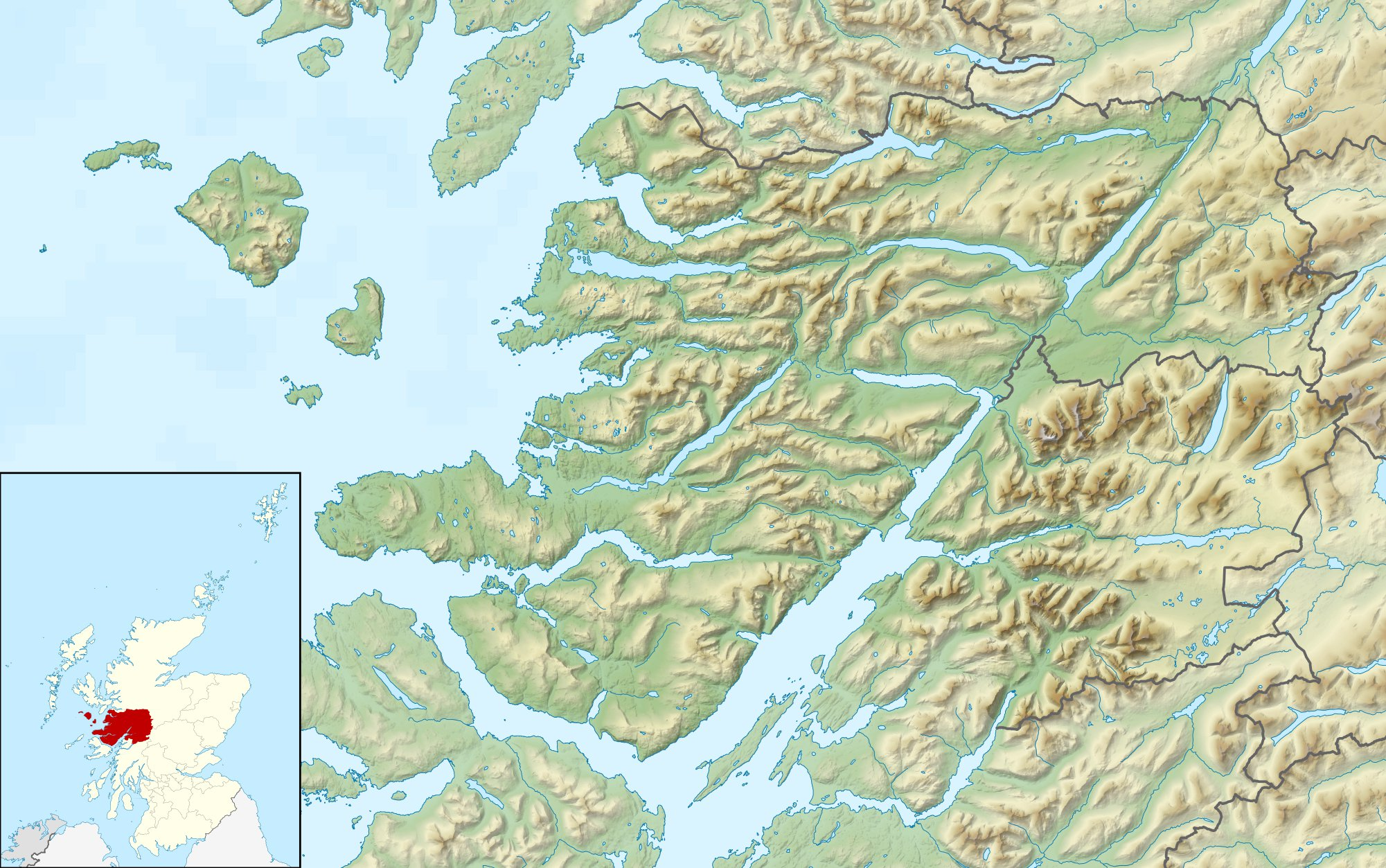
- Muck shown within the Small Isles Muck shown within Lochaber
- OS grid reference: NM408794
- Coordinates: 56.83°N 6.25°W

Name
- Gaelic pronunciation: [ˈelan nə ˈmuʰk]
- Name meaning: "sea pig", from Gaelic muc, "pig", a short form of muc-mhara, "whale".

Physical geography
- Island group: Small Isles
- Area: 559 ha (2 1/8 sq mi)
- Area rank: 70
- Highest elevation: Beinn Airein, 137 m (449 ft)

Administration
- Council area: Highland
- Country: Scotland
- Sovereign state: United Kingdom

Demographics
- Population: 28
- Population rank: 57
- Population density: 5/km^{2} (13/sq mi)
- Largest settlement: Port Mòr

Muck (/ˈmʌk/; Scottish Gaelic: Eilean nam Muc) is the smallest of four main islands in the Small Isles, part of the Inner Hebrides of Scotland. Today, much of the island is used for grazing. Residents use wool to make rugs and clothing. There are several ancient monuments and some facilities for visitors. The few residents are served by a single school, Muck Primary School & Nursery. The island is owned by the MacEwen family.

== Geology ==
The larger part of the island is formed from olivine-phyric basalt flows erupted during the Palaeocene. Flows of hawaiite can also be found around the south coast. Together these form the Eigg Lava Formation, a greater part of which is exposed on Eigg itself. The lava flows are cut through by a swarm of Palaeocene age basalt and dolerite dykes generally aligned NNW-SSE. A handful of faults are mapped on a similar alignment, the most significant one of which stretches SE from Bagh a Ghallanaichy of Laig. Gabbro is exposed along the eastern side of the bay of Camas Mor whilst on its western side are a suite of sedimentary rocks including small exposures of the Valtos Sandstone, Duntulm and Kilmaluag formations representing the upper part of the middle Jurassic Great Estuarine Group which is more extensively exposed on nearby Eigg.

There are some peat and till deposits on the island, albeit restricted in extent.

== Geography ==
Muck is adjacent to the other Small Isles (Canna, Rùm and Eigg). It measures roughly 2 1/2 miles (4 kilometres) east to west. The island's tallest hill is Beinn Airein (137 m or 449 ft).

The island's population was 28 as recorded by the 2022 census, just one more than the figure in the 2011 census and five fewer than the 31 usual residents in 2001. The populace mostly live near the harbour at Port Mòr. The other settlement on the island is the farm at Gallanach. The island's only road, about 2.5 km (1 1/2 mi) long, connects the two.

Muck is also known for its seal population, and for the porpoises in the surrounding waters.

== Facilities ==
A causeway and slipway were built at Port Mòr in 2005. This allows vehicles to be driven on and off the Caledonian MacBrayne ferry, MV Lochnevis, which links Muck and the neighbouring Small Isles with the mainland port of Mallaig (2½ hours away). However, visitors are not normally permitted to bring vehicles to the Small Isles. During the summer months the islands are also served by Arisaig Marine's ferry MV Sheerwater from Arisaig, 10 miles (16 kilometres) south of Mallaig. It is featured in the on-line newspaper West Word.

The island has no church, shop or post office, and, uniquely among Scottish islands with a population of this size, it has no post box. Until 1970 it had no electricity supply; this was initially provided by means of diesel generators (Note: just 13 people lived on the island at the time), but in 1999 two large wind turbines were built. There is a hotel, Gallanach Lodge, and a range of other holiday accommodation.

== Etymology ==
The English name of the island derives from the Gaelic word muc which James Boswell in 1785 took to mean that the name of the island meant Sow's Island. It is now thought to refer to the high number of porpoises around it, loosely called muc-mhara 'sea-pig' (cf mereswine). The laird in Boswell's era disliked the name, especially as it meant him being referred to as Muck, and thus had attempted to persuade Samuel Johnson and Boswell that the authentic name was "Isle of Monk".

== History ==
=== Early history ===
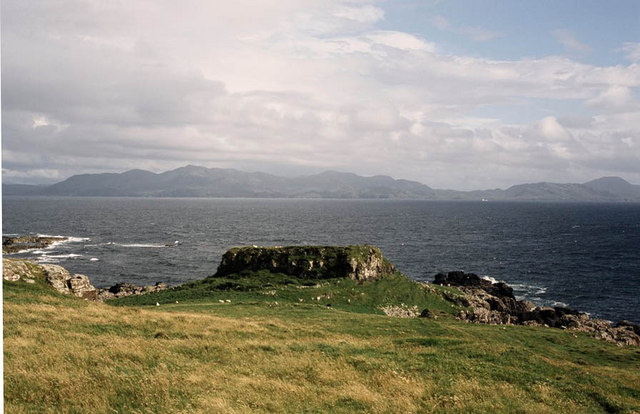
Caistel nan Duin Bhan

A thumbnail scraper found at Toaluinn on Muck (Note: Photograph available here) indicates possible occupation in the Neolithic Era. This appears to have continued into the Bronze Age, if a dagger found on Muck, and dating between 800 and 400 BC, is anything to go by (Note: the dagger, found during bog draining in 1920, is now in the Edinburgh Royal Museum). A number of cairns, of ambiguous date, are scattered around Port Mòr, and elsewhere on the island. At some point in the Iron Age, a natural stack – Caistel nan Duin Bhan – in a commanding position near Port Mòr, was fortified by construction of a thick wall around the summit; it remained in use until medieval times.

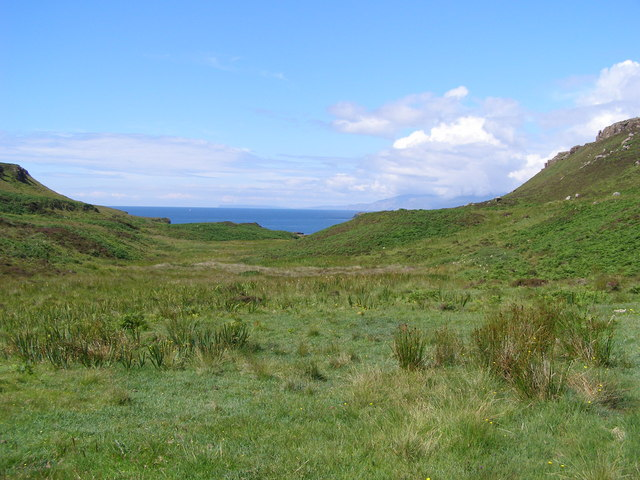
Glen Martin

According to local traditions, after Columba, a 6th-century Irishman, established a campaign (based at Iona) to Christianise the region, he himself visited Muck. A field adjacent to the ancient graveyard in Kiel (Note: the former village of Kiel was adjacent to Port Mòr) was historically named Dail Chill Fionain (the field of Finnian's Church), in reference to Columba's tutor; the undated remains of an ancient chapel lie within the graveyard (Note: Photograph here), which also contained two inscribed slabs which seem to date from this period (Note: now moved to a building in Port Mòr, for protection; photographs here and here). The name of Glen Martin is likewise traditionally ascribed to a hermit who supposedly lived there at this time.

=== Kingdom of the Isles ===
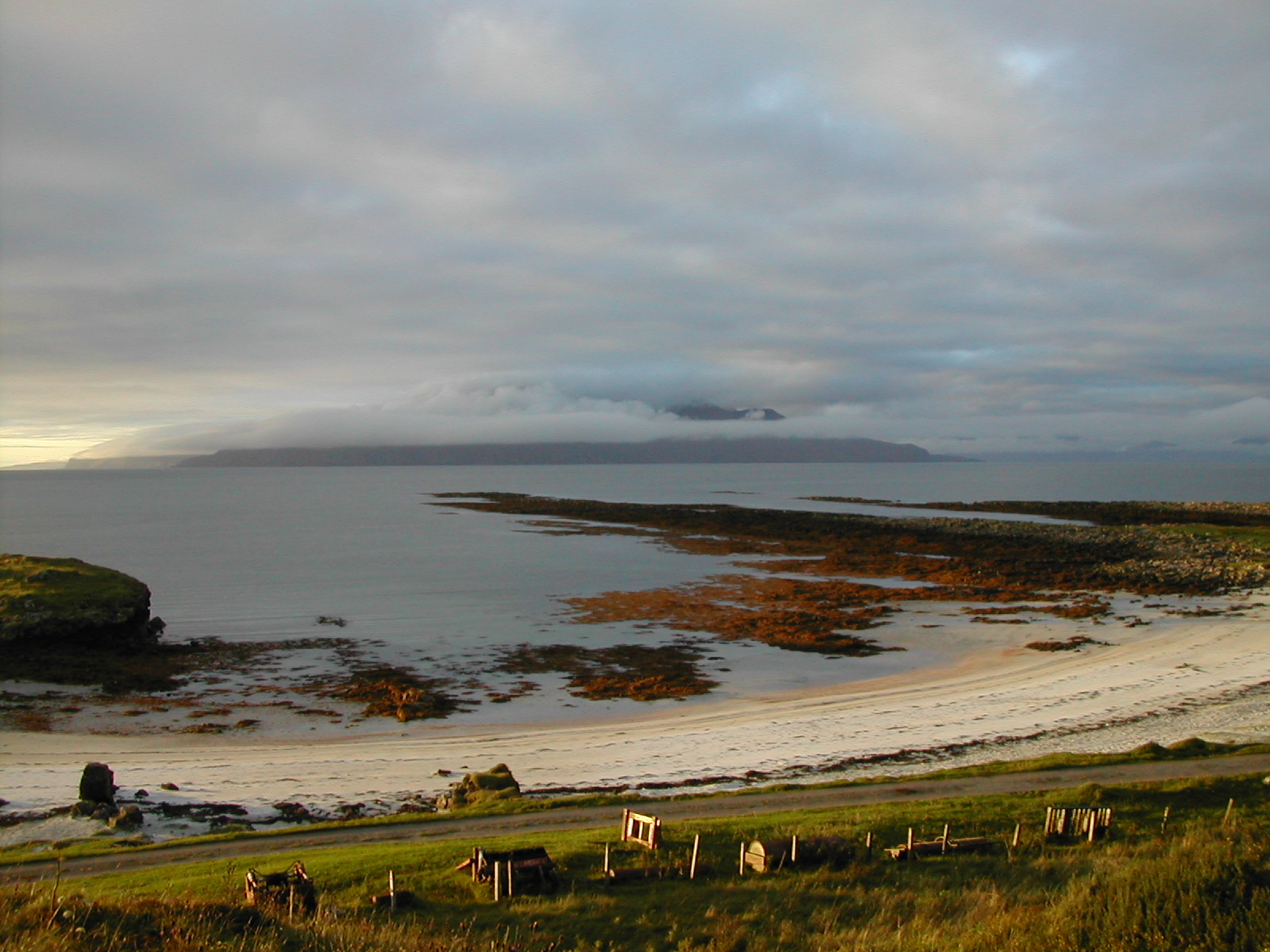
Gallanach beach

In the 9th century, Vikings invaded the Small Isles, along with the rest of the Hebrides, and the gaelic kingdom of Dál Riata to the south, establishing the Kingdom of the Isles throughout these lands. For a long time, the only known evidence of Viking presence in Muck were Norse-based placenames such as Godag and Lamhraig, but more recently, limited remains were found in Northern Muck of a building which could date to this era (Note: Currently (in 2017), the dating is uncertain). Following Norwegian unification, the Kingdom of the Isles became a crown dependency of the Norwegian king; to the Norwegians it was Suðreyjar (meaning southern isles). Malcolm III of Scotland acknowledged in writing that Suðreyjar was not Scottish, and king Edgar quitclaimed any residual doubts. However, in the mid 12th century, Somerled, a Norse-Gael of uncertain origin, launched a coup, which made Suðreyjar entirely independent.

Following his death, Norwegian authority was nominally restored, but in practice the kingdom was divided between Somerled's heirs; the MacRory, a branch of Somerled's descendants, ruled a region stretching from Uist to the Rough Bounds, and including the Small Isles. In 1209, the MacRory donated Muck to the (Norwegian) Bishop of the Isles (Note: also known as the Bishop of Sodor and Man (Sodor is the traditional anglicisation of Suðreyjar)).

=== Bishop of the Isles ===
Little is recorded of how the Bishop dealt with Muck, but in 1266, by the Treaty of Perth, the Scottish king purchased the whole of Suðreyjar (Note: for 4000 marks). At the turn of the century, William I had created the position of Sheriff of Inverness, to be responsible for the Scottish highlands, which theoretically now extended to Muck; nevertheless, the Treaty explicitly preserved the status of the various divisions of Suðreyjar as crown dependencies, leaving the Bishop effectively sovereign. Awkwardly, the Bishopric remained part of the Norwegian Archdiocese of Niðarós, until Shetland and Orkney also joined the Scottish king's possessions, in 1472 (at which point the Bishopric became part of the new Archdiocese of St Andrews).

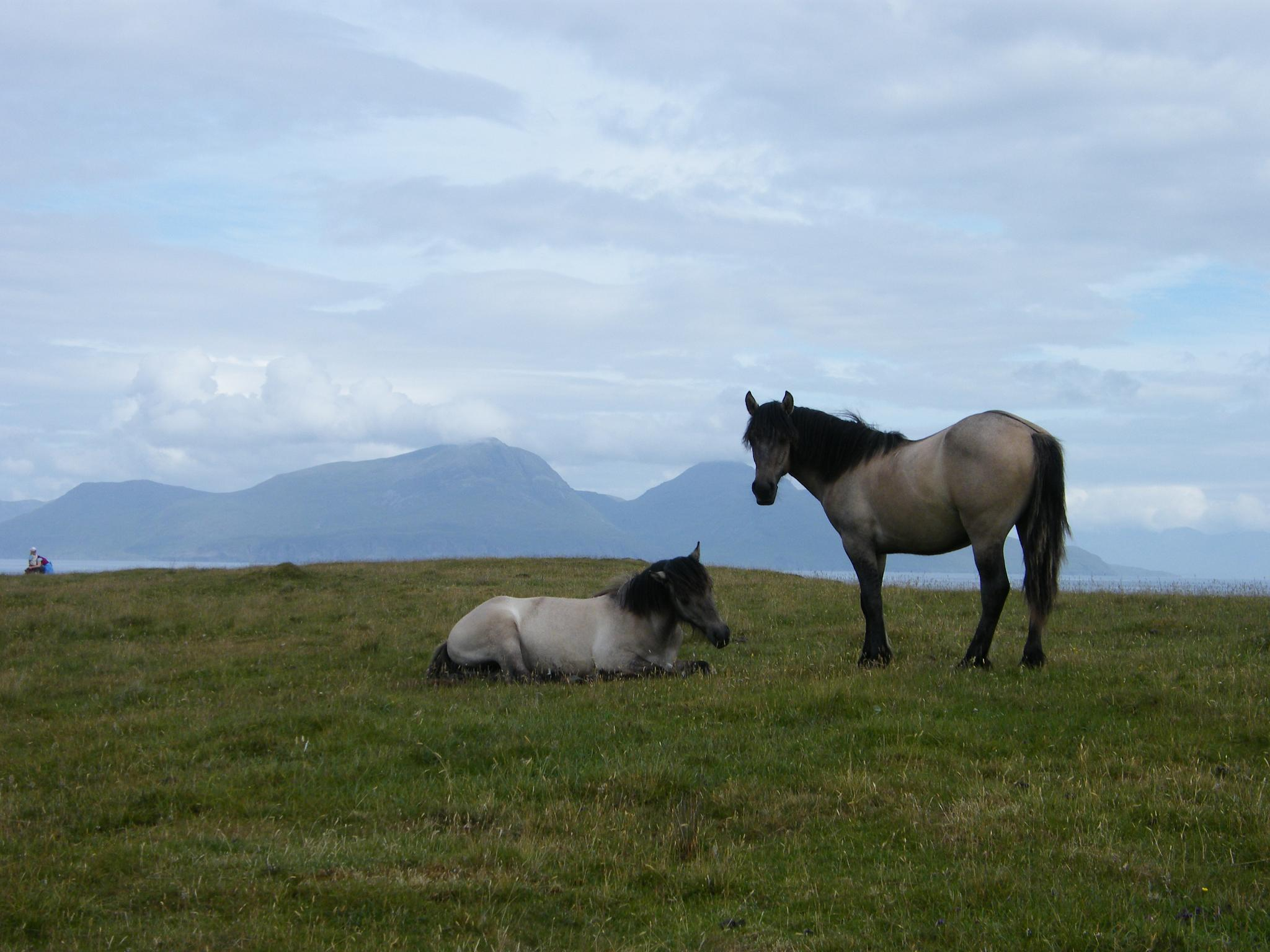
Ponies on Muck

In 1549, conducting a survey, the Dean of the Isles (Donald Monro) wrote:

Be ane haffe myle of sea to this ile, lyes ane ile of twa myle lang, callit in Erische Ellannaneche, that is the Swynes ile, and very fertill and fruitful of cornes and grassing for all store, and verey guid for fishing, inhabit and manurit, a good falcon nest in it. It perteynis to the Bishope of the iles, with ane guid heighland haven in it, the entrey quherof is at the west cheik.

The Dean's account is the first known written reference to Muck. He went on to describe the offshore islet of Eilean nan Each as "in Englishe the Horse ile, guid for horse and uther store, perteining to the Bishope of the iles.". At this time, the Bishopric was based on Iona (called Icolmkill at this time – the Isle of Columba's Church); many centuries later, Boswell reported being told by the inhabitants that the island had been "churchland belonging to Icolmkill".

According to the Bishop's rental accounts, of 1561, his tenants in Muck were the MacIans (Note: with an 'I', not an 'L'; they are not MacLeans). The MacIans were the lairds of Ardnamurchan on the adjacent mainland, but no records have yet been found to indicate when or why they became tenants on Muck as well; Muck is the most fertile of the Small Isles, so the land would certainly have been desirable.

=== MacLeans and MacIans ===
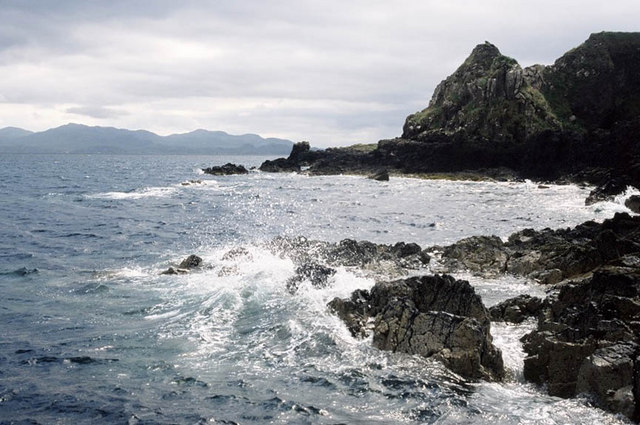
Northern coastline

The MacIans were a branch of the MacDonalds, with whom the MacLeans of Duart had a longstanding feud, concerning the Rhinns of Islay. In 1588, some of the remains of the Spanish Armada found refuge with the MacLeans, who demanded the Spanish supply 100 soldiers, in return for refuge; they having agreed, the Maclean leader took the opportunity to attack the Small Isles in relation to his feud with the MacDonalds. The MacIans fought them off, and the Spanish eventually departed from the region without even paying for the provisions given to them by the MacLeans.

The Scottish reformation was rapidly sweeping through the region at this time; the MacLeans, and even Dean Monro himself, became presbyterians. In 1617, Andrew Knox, a presbyterian who reluctantly held the post of Bishop of the Isles, sold Muck to Lachlan Maclean, the laird of Coll. Lachlan expelled the MacIans at once, then gave Muck to his younger son, Hector. Coll, along with the lands of the MacLeans of Duart, was under the shrieval authority of the sheriff of Argyll; under pressure from the Earl of Argyll, one of the most powerful Scottish political figures of the age, shrieval authority over Muck was transferred from Inverness to the latter sheriff, which was under the control of the Earl's family.

In 1650, the MacIans lost control of Ardnamurchan as well, and decided to seek revenge on Hector for the way Lachlan had treated them. They landed on Muck at night, and started rustling away the cattle. Hector happened to be outside at the time, and shot at them; in turn, Gillespie MacIan Shaor, one of the MacIans present, shot back, killing Hector. By this point Hector had a son, and therefore founded the line of MacLeans of Muck. Their comital authority was extinguished by the Heritable Jurisdictions Act, in 1746, but they retained considerable power as lairds.

=== Religion and disease ===
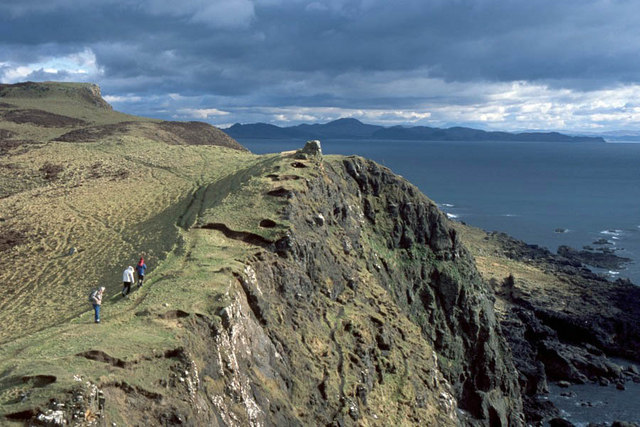
South west coast

On Muck, the reformation had left the population balanced between presbyterians and Roman Catholics; in 1764, each amounted to nearly half the population. A few years later, however, the MacLeans Lairds began a campaign of religious persecution, demanding that all tenants renounce the Catholic Church in Scotland, or face eviction. In 1770, the MacLean laird's wife even arrested up a Roman Catholic priest (Note: by the name of Alexander Kennedy), who had just arrived to visit the Catholic population of Muck, telling him she was following "Boisdale's example" (Note: In Boisdale, on South Uist, the laird had established a local school, in which pupils were obliged to break specific Roman Catholic religious tenets, like the Roman Catholic belief in not eating meat during Lent. Roman Catholic priests consequently advised parents to avoid sending their children to that school, which prompted the laird to order the priests to leave, under threat of military intervention); the priest was deported to the Scottish mainland as soon as a ship became available.

When Samuel Johnson and James Boswell visited the region in 1773, though they didn't visit Muck in person, the laird (Note: Hector MacLean) was keen to ensure they were aware of his philanthropy, which Johnson subsequently reported in his book A Journey to the Western Islands of Scotland:

The Laird having all his people under his immediate view, seems to be very attentive to their happiness. The devastation of the small-pox, when it visits places where it comes seldom, is well known. He has disarmed it of its terrour at Muack, by inoculating eighty of his people (Note: meaning that he paid for them to be inoculated, rather than doing it himself, in person). The expence was two shillings and sixpence a head. Many trades they cannot have among them, but upon occasion, he fetches a smith from the Isle of Egg, and has a tailor from the main land, six times a year.

=== Prosperity and poverty ===
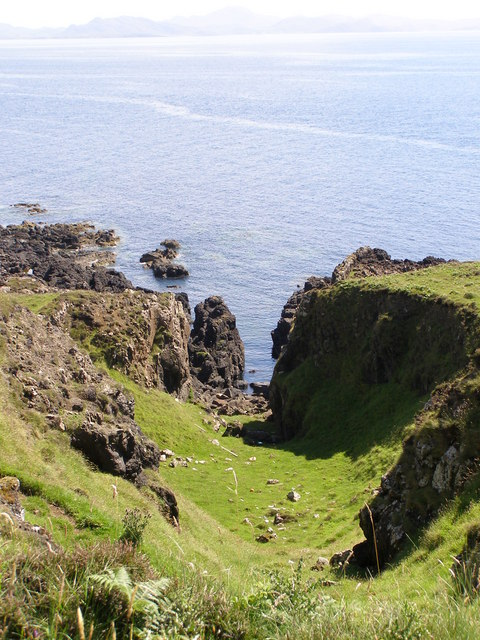
A steep coastal valley

Johnson's work also gives an insight into the prosperity on Muck:

This little Island, however it be named, is of considerable value. It is two English miles long, and three-quarters of a mile broad, and consequently contains only nine hundred and sixty English acres. It is chiefly arable. Half of this little dominion the Laird retains in his own hand, and on the other half, live one hundred and sixty persons, who pay their rent by exported corn. What rent they pay, we were not told, and could not decently inquire. The proportion of the people to the land is such, as the most fertile countries do not commonly maintain.

Nevertheless, Lachlan, his nephew and eventual heir, fell into debt, as a result of being appointed Resident Governor of the Tower of London; in 1802 he therefore sold Muck to the leader of Clan Ranald.

Following the outbreak of the Napoleonic Wars, a decade after Johnson's visit, the availability of certain minerals became restricted, causing the price for kelp (Note: the burning of which produces soda ash) to rocket. The Clan Ranald leader had no compunction in taking advantage of this, by deliberately halving tenancies in size – turning 24 plots into 47 – in order to stop them being self-sufficient (Note: the practice became known as crofting); tenants would have to take on other work – such as kelp harvesting – to survive.

In 1813, shortly after the kelp price peaked, Muck was sold to Colonel Alexander MacLean, leader of the MacLeans of Coll, for the comparatively large price of £9,975 (Note: £635,034 if adjusted by CPI alone, to 2016; property price inflation would be even higher). However, when the Napoleonic Wars ended, just a few years later, the kelp price collapsed, making rents impossible for the population of Muck to afford. With no way to get value from his purchase, Colonel MacLean fell into debt, and in 1826 decided to replace his tenants with sheep. Several had already emigrated to Canada, in 1822, and in 1828 the Colonel bade 100 more to join them (Note: they went to Cape Breton, via a ship named "St Lawrence"). The remaining population built the village of Keil, by Port Mòr, and moved there. By 1835, however, most have moved to other areas of Scotland or emigrated.

=== Cows and fish ===
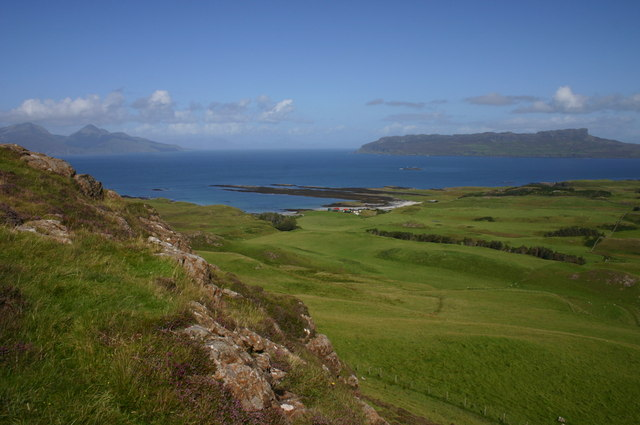
Farmland at Gallanach

In the late 1830s, the island was leased to John Cameron, (Note: nicknamed Corriechoillie after his home, near Spean Bridge) a famed cattle-drover, who replaced the sheep with cattle. In 1846, the lease was transferred to James Thorburn, (Note: for £320 a year) who re-introduced sheep. Five years later, Muck was sold to Captain Swinburne, with the Thorburns keeping a lease of the farmland, under him. While the Thorburns built roads and installed a threshing machine, Swinburne was keen to invest in fishing, and built dykes (Scottish term for dry stone walls), and a pier at Port Mòr; when not working on the farm, the remaining islanders fished the Rockall area. The Thorburns introduced Cheviot sheep and were successful in this endeavour.

In 1878, a family from Ayrshire who were farming on the Isle of Coll – the Weirs – became the tenants of the farmland, transforming it into an arable establishment, and dairy farm, specialising in cheese. In 1889, administrative counties were formally created in Scotland, on shrieval boundaries, by a dedicated Local Government Act; Muck therefore became part of the new county of Argyll. However, the Act established a boundary review, which decided, in 1891, to move Muck to the county of Inverness, where Eigg already sat.

In 1896 Muck was sold to Robert Lawrie Thomson, who owned Eigg and Strathaird Estate on Skye. Thomson died in 1913, and Muck was left to his older brother, John MacEwen. When John died in 1916, he left Muck to his nephew, Lieutenant William Ivan Lawrence MacEwen, who left the Royal Navy, and retrained at agricultural college, subsequently taking over the running of the farm in 1922. His descendants have owned the island ever since. In the early 1970s, the family built the hotel at Port Mòr. In the 21st century Muck is operated by a Trust set up by the MacEwen family.

== Prince of Muck ==
On 18 May 2022, BBC Four broadcast the documentary Prince of Muck about Lawrence MacEwen, laird of the island. The documentary had previously had a showing on BBC Scotland in April, with the programme getting a national broadcast slot on BBC Four just two days after MacEwen died, aged 81, on 16 May 2022. Prince of Muck received a 5 star review in The Telegraph with reviewer Benji Wilson saying the documentary by director Cindy Jansen was a "film of elegiac brilliance".

== See also ==
- List of islands of Scotland

== Bibliography ==
- Boswell, James; Johnson, Samuel; Carruthers, Robert (1852). The journal of a tour to the Hebrides with Samuel Johnson, LL.D. Office of the national illustrated Library.
- Haswell-Smith, Hamish (2004). The Scottish Islands. Edinburgh: Canongate. ISBN 978-1-84195-454-7.
- Johnson, Samuel (1792). A Journey to the Western Islands of Scotland. Edinburgh: Lawrie & Symington. p. 97.
- Mac an Tàilleir, Iain (2003) Goireasan Cànain / Language Resources - Tadhail is Ionnsaich : Pàrlamaid na h-Alba. (pdf) Pàrlamaid na h-Alba. Retrieved 26 October 2025.
- Monro, Sir Donald (1549) Description of the Western Isles of Scotland. William Auld. Edinburgh - 1774 edition.
