= Staffin Bay Formation =

Geologic formation in Scotland

- Stratigraphic range: Callovian
- Type: Formation
- Unit of: Hebrides Basin
- Sub-units: Upper Ostrea Member, Belemnite Sands Member
- Underlies: Staffin Shale Formation
- Overlies: Skudiburgh Formation
- Thickness: up to 19 metres (60 ft)

Lithology
- Primary: Mudstone, Sandstone, Siltstone
- Other: Limestone

Location
- Region: Europe
- Country: Scotland
- Extent: Inner Hebrides

Type section
- Named for: Staffin Bay
- Location: Coastal exposure near Dunan
- Thickness at type section: 15.95 m

The Staffin Bay Formation is a geologic formation in Scotland that preserves fossils dating back to the Callovian stage of the Middle Jurassic. It composed of two members: the lower Upper Ostrea Member, which features of dark grey, fissile mudstone with a shelly limestone bed, along with laminated and rippled sandstone; and the upper Belemnite Sands Member, which consists of medium-grained calcareous sandstones and siltstones.

== See also ==
- List of fossiliferous stratigraphic units in Scotland
