= 2026 in reptile paleontology =

Fossil reptile research published in 2026 includes peer-reviewed publications on discoveries related to reptile paleontology, as well as the description of new taxa.

== Lepidosauromorphs ==
=== Squamates ===
Name	Novelty	Status	Authors	Age	Type locality	Country	Notes	Images
Acutodon	Gen. et sp. nov		Jansen et al.	Late Cretaceous (Campanian)		France	A anguimorph belonging to Pan-Shinisaurus. The type species is A. villeveyracensis.	
Carinasquama	Gen. et sp. nov	Valid	Daza et al.	Cretaceous	Probably Kachin amber	Myanmar	A probable member of Pan-Gekkota. The type species is C. rusmithii.	
Garamaudo	Gen. et sp. nov	Valid	Bardet et al.	Late Cretaceous (Santonian)		France	A mosasaur belonging to the subfamily Tethysaurinae. The type species is G. bauciensis.	
Halisaurus auriculatus	Sp. nov	Valid	Shaker et al.	Late Cretaceous (Maastrichtian)	Dakhla Formation	Egypt	A mosasaur belonging to the subfamily Halisaurinae; a species of Halisaurus.	
Lavergnesaurus	Gen. et sp. nov	Valid	Čerňanský et al.	Eocene (Bartonian)	Phosphorites du Quercy	France	A skink. The type species is L. lamarcki.	
Paleoteius	Gen. et sp. nov	Valid	Agnolín et al.	Late Cretaceous (Maastrichtian)	Allen Formation	Argentina	A possible member of Scincomorpha. The type species is P. lakui.	
Parapalaeophis	Gen. et sp. nov		Natarajan & Klompmaker	Paleocene (Danian)	Porters Creek Formation	United States (Alabama)	An aquatic snake with a combination of palaeophiid and nigerophiid morphological characters. The type species is P. jeffshawi.	
Pluridens imelaki	Sp. nov		Longirch & Jalil	Late Cretaceous (Maastrichtian)	Upper Couche III	Morocco	A mosasaur belonging to the subfamily Halisaurinae; a species of Pluridens.	
Prognathodon cipactli	Sp. nov	Valid	Rivera-Sylva et al.	Late Cretaceous (Maastrichtian)	Méndez Shale	Mexico	A mosasaur belonging to the subfamily Mosasaurinae; a species of Prognathodon.	
Tametara	Gen. et sp. nov	Valid	Simões et al.	Late Cretaceous (Santonian to Campanian)	Adamantina Formation	Brazil	An early snake. The type species is T. mirim.	
Thoraxion	Gen. et sp. nov	Valid	Sharpe et al.	Late Cretaceous (Maastrichtian)	Ciply-Malogne Phosphatic Chalk Formation	Belgium	A mosasaurine mosasaur. The type species is T. tahlequahae.	
Timon planeutes	Sp. nov	Valid	Georgalis & Čerňanský	Eocene–Oligocene	Quercy Phosphorites Formation	France	A member of the family Lacertidae; a species of Timon.	
Tylosaurus rex	Sp. nov	Valid	Zietlow et al.	Late Cretaceous (Campanian)	Wolfe City Formation	United States (Texas)	A mosasaur belonging to the subfamily Tylosaurinae; a species of Tylosaurus.	
Varanus varswater	Sp. nov	Valid	Marchitelli et al.	Pliocene	Varswater Formation	South Africa	A monitor lizard.	
Xenodontolacerta	Gen. et sp. nov	Valid	Jiang et al.	Late Cretaceous (Coniacian–Campanian)	Hekou Formation	China	A polyglyphanodontian. The type species is X. fangi	

==== Squamate research ====
- Ebel, Melville & Keogh (2026) reconstruct the evolutionary history of squamate osteoderms on the basis of data from extant and extinct reptiles, reporting evidence of 13 independent acquisitions of osteoderms, the majority of which happened in the Late Jurassic and Early Cretaceous.
- Ait Haddou et al. (2026) report the discovery of lacertoid-type tracks (comparable to traces produced by modern lizards) from the Guettioua Formation (Morocco), representing the first record of such tracks from the Jurassic strata from Gondwana.
- Piñuela et al. (2026) report the discovery of lizard trackways from the Upper Jurassic (Kimmeridgian) strata of the Lastres Formation (Spain), interpreted as the latest occurrence of the ichnogenus Rhynchosauroides reported to date.
- Andrade-Silva & Francischini (2026) revise purported lacertoid tracks from the Lower Cretaceous strata from the Ouro Ichnosite (Botucatu Formation, Brazil), and argue that putative tracks cannot be confidently assigned to any ichnotaxon and might actually be substrate-related artifacts.
- A detached lizard tail interpreted as direct evidence of autotomy is described from the Cretaceous amber from Myanmar by Fabrikant et al. (2026).
- A study on changes in the skeleton of Lygodactylus neglectus during its ontogeny is published by Wege, Ceríaco & Passos (2026).
- Evidence of previously unrecognized morphological variation of autotomic structures is reported in tails of specimens of Yabeinosaurus sp. and Dalinghosaurus longidigitus from the Lower Cretaceous Jiufotang and Yixian formations (China) by Hou, Zhou & Yi (2026).
- New skink (the first fossil record of the group in Siwaliks) and agamid (including cf. Uromastyx sp.) fossil material is described from the Dunera locality (Punjab, India) by Singh et al. (2026), who interpret these findings as evidence of cold and drier climatic conditions during the Miocene.
- Uchman et al. (2026) identify a trace fossil from Pleistocene consolidated aeolianites from the Maio island (Cape Verde) interpreted as produced by a sand-swimming skink, and name a new ichnotaxon Cochlichnus grandis.
- Stanley et al. (2026) study the phylogenetic relationships of Konkasaurus mahalana, and recover it as a member of the family Gerrhosauridae.
- New anatomical data on Funiusaurus luanchuanensis is provided by Dong et al. (2026).
- Redescription of the skull anatomy of Pleistocene amphisbaenians Amphisbaena braestrupi and Amphisbaena laurenti is published by Paiva, Costa & Hipsley (2026).
- Garcia-Escolà et al. (2026) study cranial bone stiffness of extant and extinct members of the genus Gallotia, reporting evidence of differences between species within this genus linked to differences in body size and diet.
- Evidence indicating that inner ear morphology is an accurate predictor of higher-order classification of extant and fossil toxicoferans is presented by Forcellati et al. (2026).
- Georgalis et al. (2026) report the discovery of fossil material of an indeterminate pleurodontan lizard from the Lutetian strata of the Uzunçarşıdere Formation (Turkey), providing evidence of Eocene dispersal of members of this group into Balkanatolia.
- The oldest glyptosaurid fossil material from Europe reported to date is described from the Paleocene strata of the Conglomérat de Cernay (France) by Georgalis & Mennecart (2026).
- Linares-Martín et al. (2026) report the first discovery of anguine (cf. Pseudopus sp.) fossil material from the Miocene strata from the Libros site (Teruel Basin; Spain).
- Xing et al. (2026) report evidence of a giant bone cell tumor within two digits of an anguimorph lizard specimen preserved within the Cretaceous Kachin amber (Myanmar).
- Rouault et al. (2026) study the variation of head shape and bite force in extant monitor lizards, and provide estimates of bite force of Varanus priscus.
- Redescription and a study on the affinities of Prognathodon waiparaensis is published by Young et al. (2026).
- Comans, Tobin & Totten (2026) reconstruct the thermoregulatory modes of Platecarpus and Tylosaurus from the Smoky Hill Chalk Member of the Niobrara Formation (Kansas, United States) on the basis stable oxygen isotope composition of tooth enamel, interpreted as consistent with endothermy.
- Zietlow, Everhart & Polcyn (2026) redescribe the holotypes of Tylosaurus proriger and T. nepaeolicus, and revise diagnoses of both species.
- Sharpe et al. (2026) provide new information on skull pathologies of two specimens of Mosasaurus hoffmannii from the Maastricht Formation (Belgium) originally interpreted as affected by infected fractures, interpreting the subadult specimen as preserving evidence of a misaligned alveolus, and interpreting the large adult specimen as preserving evidence of pseudoarthrosis and probable bite marks.
- Evidence from the study of tail morphology of Platecarpus tympaniticus, Tylosaurus proriger, Plotosaurus bennisoni and Mosasaurus sp., indicative of different lunge speed and possibly different hunting strategies of russellosaurine and mosasaurine mosasaurs, is presented by Formoso et al. (2026).
- Voiculescu-Holvad et al. (2026) revise mosasaur fossil material from the Maastrichtian strata from Denmark, reporting the first evidence of presence of Mosasaurus lemonnieri? in the studied assemblage, and providing evidence of presence of a diverse mosasaur assemblage that included taxa occupying several ecological guilds and maintained high ecological diversity until the final 50 000 years of the Cretaceous.
- Fossil material of representatives of two distinct taxa of late Paleocene snakes is described from the Cernay site (France) by Georgalis & Mennecart (2026).
- Datta & Bajpai (2026) report the discovery of new fossil material of constrictor snakes from the Ypresian strata of the Cambay Shale and from the Lutetian strata from Panandhro (India), possibly representing new taxa, and preserving evidence of differences of body size of snakes from the two sites which might be indicative of ecological and environmental differences.
- A study on the composition of the Miocene snake fossil assemblage from the strata of the Upper Freshwater Molasse from the Öhningen site (Germany) is published by Smith & Georgalis (2026).
- Liaw et al. (2026) report the discovery of a vertebra of a large-bodied python from the Pleistocene strata of the Chiting Formation (Taiwan).
- The first fossil remains of the European ratsnake reported from Crete (Greece) are described from the Pleistocene strata from the Rethymnon fissure by Lizak et al. (2026).
- Syromyatnikova & Tarasova (2026) identify fossil material of the blotched snake and the Caspian whipsnake in the Lower Pleistocene strata from the Taurida Cave (Crimea).
- A subadult specimen of Malpolon cf. monspessulanus preserved with a portion of the skull and vertebrae is described from the Pleistocene strata from Quibas (Spain) by Navarro-Rodríguez et al. (2026).
- Jansen et al. (2026) report the discovery of a new assemblage of squamate fossils from the Campanian strata of the Villeveyrac-Mèze basin (France), including the oldest European members of Pan-Shinisaurus, Madtsoiidae, Monstersauria and Iguanomorpha reported to date, and possibly the oldest known anguid worldwide.
- Lemierre, Wilenzik & Orliac (2026) describe fossils of members of two snake assemblages from the Eocene and Oligocene strata from the Dams locality (Quercy Phosphorites Formation, France), providing evidence of a complete species turnover between the two assemblages.
- A study on the composition of the middle Pleistocene snake assemblage from the Azykh Cave (Azerbaijan) is published by Ratnikov (2026).
- Keenan Early et al. (2026) report evidence from the study of remains of extant squamates and squamate fossils from Pleistocene and early Holocene localities in Nevada, New Mexico and Texas (United States) indicative of utility of zooarchaeology by mass spectrometry for taxonomic identification of squamate fossils.

=== Other lepidosauromorphs ===
Name	Novelty	Status	Authors	Age	Type locality	Country	Notes	Images
Airistagiz	Gen. et sp. nov	Valid	Sobral & Schoch	Middle Triassic (Ladinian)	Erfurt Formation	Germany	A stem-lepidosaur. The type species is A. seegisi.	
Coloradosphenodon	Gen. et sp. nov	Valid	Gaetano et al.	Late Triassic (Norian)	Los Colorados Formation	Argentina	A sphenodontian. The type species is C. lahni.	
Hohlachia	Gen. et sp. nov	Valid	Sobral & Schoch	Middle Triassic (Ladinian)	Erfurt Formation	Germany	A stem-lepidosaur. The type species is H. multidens.	
Klainjosaura	Gen. et sp. nov	Valid	Sobral & Schoch	Middle Triassic (Ladinian)	Erfurt Formation	Germany	A stem-lepidosaur. The type species is K. staroskalja.	

==== Other lepidosauromorph research ====
- Damke et al. (2026) describe new fossil material of Cargninia enigmatica from the Norian strata of the Candelária Sequence of the Santa Maria Supersequence (Brazil), providing new information on the anatomy of the dentary and on the neuroanatomy of members of this species.
- Beccari & Rauhut (2026) report the first discovery of rhynchocephalian fossil material from the Upper Jurassic (Oxfordian) Cañadón Calcáreo Formation (Argentina).
- Haridy et al. (2026) describe new fossil material of Eilenodon robustus from the strata of the Morrison Formation from Utah and Wyoming (United States), and provide the first three-dimensional reconstructions of the skull anatomy of this taxon and the first detailed study of its tooth row histology.
- Cavasin, Cerda & Apesteguía (2026) study the histology of the beak-like structure in Priosphenodon avelasi, and report that the studied structure is not formed by teeth fused to the premaxillae, but instead it is entirely formed by bone tissue.
- Beccari et al. (2026) compare the anatomy of the axial skeleton of extant tuataras and their extinct relatives, and identify osteological features of significance in the studies of systematics and ecomorphology of extinct rhynchocephalians.
- Review of research from preceding years on the phylogenetic relationships and evolutionary history of early lepidosaurs is published by Evans (2026).

== Ichthyosauromorphs ==
Name	Novelty	Status	Authors	Age	Type locality	Country	Notes	Images
Ammonitritor	Gen. et sp. nov.		Sander et al.	Early Triassic (Olenekian)	Vikinghøgda Formation	Norway	A member of the family Omphalosauridae. The type species is A. scientiacivium.	
Jabalisaurus tethyensis	Sp. nov	Valid	Maxwell, Neumann & Serafini	Late Jurassic (Tithonian)	Altmühltal Formation	Germany	An ophthalmosaurid ichthyosaur; a species of Jabalisaurus.	

=== Ichthyosauromorph research ===
- Wang et al. (2026) describe a juvenile specimen of Hupehsuchus nanchangensis from the Lower Triassic (Olenekian) strata from Hubei (China), and interpret its anatomy as supporting the identification of H. nanchangensis and Nanchangosaurus suni as distinct species.
- A study on the anatomy of the ichthyopterygian specimen NSM-PV-20028 from the Lower Triassic Osawa Formation (Japan), assigned to cf. Utatsusaurus hataii, is published by Yoshizawa & Tsuihiji (2026).
- Evidence indicating that the relative size of the notochordal canal on vertebral centra can be used to study developmental stage of ichthyosaur fetuses is presented by Miedema & Maxwell (2026).
- A gravid specimen of Mixosaurus panxianensis preserved with remains of a least 11 fetuses is described from the Middle Triassic (Anisian) strata of the Guanling Formation (China) by Gu et al. (2026).
- Miedema et al. (2026) describe the foetus preserved within the holotype specimen of Besanosaurus leptorhynchus, reporting evidence of presence of palatine teeth, and argue that the holotype specimen of Wimanius odontopalatus might represent a juvenile specimen of Besanosaurus.
- A new specimen of Temnodontosaurus cf. trigonodon, providing new information on the skeletal anatomy of Temnodontosaurus and preserving evidence of pathological changes in the shoulder and jaw joints that might have been related to the animal's hunting and feeding behavior, is described from the Lower Jurassic (Toarcian) strata of the Jurensismergel Formation (Germany) by Eggmaier & Albert (2026).
- Jian et al. (2026) reconstruct the fossilization sequence of a three-dimensionally preserved specimen of Stenopterygius or Hauffiopteryx from the Posidonia Shale (Germany), reporting evidence of impact of coupled microbial redox processes and carbonate cementation on the preservation of the studied specimen.
- Biot et al. (2026) describe a specimen of Stenopterygius quadriscissus from the Toarcian strata of the Whitby Mudstone Formation (United Kingdom) and revise the species of the genus Stenopterygius, interpreting S. uniter as a junior synonym of S. longipes and interpreting Magnipterygius huenei as a junior synonym of S. quadriscissus.
- The first confirmed specimen of Ichthyosaurus anningae found outside the United Kingdom is described from the Lower Jurassic (Pliensbachian) strata of the Rodiles Formation (Spain) by Fernández et al. (2026).
- Evidence indicating that the holotype of Mollesaurus periallus was affected by infectious skeletal pathologies (including an osteomyelitis-like infection in the ribs) is presented by Mitidieri et al. (2026).
- Probable ophthalmosaurid specimen representing the first partially articulated ichthyosaur skeleton reported from the insular Caribbean is described from the Tithonian strata of the Guasasa Formation (Cuba) by Iturralde-Vinent et al. (2026).
- Krøglid, Faure-Brac & Delsett (2026) compare the microstructure of ribs and gastralia of Late Jurassic ophthalmosaurids and modern toothed whales, reporting evidence of localized growth variation in ichthyosaur ribs, and evidence of more compact compact ribs in ichthyosaurs compared to toothed whales.
- Martinez-Motta et al. (2026) report evidence of preservation of integumentary tissues in a brachypterygiid ichthyosaur specimen from the Paja Formation (Colombia).
- White et al. (2026) describe a dismembered specimen of Platypterygius australis from the Lower Cretaceous (Albian) Toolebuc Formation (Australia), preserved with gut contents including cephalopod, fish and pterosaur remains, and preserving evidence of bite marks likely produced by Kronosaurus queenslandicus; their interpretation of the studied specimen as preserved with gut contents is contested by Poropat & Nielsen-Smith (2026) and reaffirmed as the most likely interpretation by White, Bevitt & Trusler (2026).

== Sauropterygians ==
Name	Novelty	Status	Authors	Age	Type locality	Country	Notes	Images
Argentinonectes	Gen. et sp. nov	In press	Novas et al.	Late Cretaceous (Maastrichtian)	Calafate Formation	Argentina	An elasmosaurid plesiosaur. The type species is A. calafatensis.	
Gondwananectes	Gen. et sp. nov		Otero et al.	Middle Jurassic (Bajocian)	Quehuita Formation	Chile	A plesiosaur with affinities with Cryptoclidia. The type species is G. osvaldoi.	
Nothosaurus fortihumeralis	Sp. nov.		Li et al.	Middle Triassic (Anisian)	Guanling Formation	China	A nothosaurid	
Pahasapasaurus gillettei	Sp. nov.	In press	Schmeisser McKean	Late Cretaceous (Turonian)	Tropic Shale	United States (Utah)	A polycotylid plesiosaur; a species of Pahasapasaurus. Announced in 2025, the final article version will be published in 2026.	
Spatulidentatus	Gen. et sp. nov		Yang et al.	Middle Triassic (Anisian)	Guanling Formation	China	A probable basal sauropterygian of uncertain affinities. The type species is S. breviceps.	

=== Sauropterygian research ===
- Description of a new specimen of Panzhousaurus rotundirostris from the Middle Triassic (Anisian) Guanling Formation (China) and a study on the affinities of the species is published by Tan, Xu & Shang (2026).
- Zhang et al. (2026) determine the age and duration of the Ladinian Xingyi Fauna on the basis of the study of astrochronology and cyclostratigraphy of the Nimaigu Section of the Falang Formation (China), providing evidence of brief duration of the typical species of this fauna, Keichousaurus hui.
- The oldest simosaurid fossil material reported to date is documented from the Anisian strata from Makhtesh Ramon (Israel) by Cabezuelo-Hernández, de Miguel Chaves & Pérez-García (2026).
- Cabezuelo-Hernández et al. (2026) describe the postcranial skeleton of the paratype of Paludidraco multidentatus, providing information on the variability of the postcranial skeleton of members of this species.
- Zhao (2026) presents a standardized protocol for skeletal reconstruction of plesiosaurs, identifies skeletal proxies for estimates of plesiosaur body mass, and provides estimates of body lengths and masses of 27 plesiosaur models.
- Evidence of a correlation between plesiosaur occurrences and expansion of shallow seas flooding continental areas is presented by Aspromonte & O'Gorman (2026).
- Redescription of the anatomy and a study on the affinities of Lusonectes sauvagei is published by Sachs & Madzia (2026).
- A study on the anatomy and affinities of "Plesiosaurus" posidoniae is published by Sachs, Schweigert & Madzia (2026).
- Bartlett, Martill & Smith (2026) provide a new range of estimates of body size of Liopleurodon ferox.
- García-Guerrero et al. (2026) describe a cervical vertebra of a member of the subfamily Brachaucheninae from the Valanginian strata of the Rosablanca Formation (Colombia), representing the oldest fossil material of a large pliosaurid from the Lower Cretaceous strata in northern South America reported to date.
- Barrientos-Lara et al. (2026) identify fossil material of pliosaurids belonging to the clade Thalassophonea from the Aptian strata of the La Péna Formation (Mexico).
- Knaust (2026) describes small-sized accumulations of invertebrate fossils from the Middle and Upper Jurassic strata of the Krossfjord, Fensfjord, Heather and Sognefjord formations offshore Norway, interpreted as most likely to be regurgitalites produced by cryptoclidid plesiosaurs, and names new ichnotaxa Vomitus concha V. serpula and V. echinoderma.
- Probable elasmosaurid vertebra, representing the first plesiosaur record from Algeria, is described from the Coniacian strata of the Essen Formation in the Tébessa Mountains by Nadir Naimi et al. (2026).
- Evidence of a healing fracture and periostitis is reported in elasmosaurid specimens from the Maastrichtian Snow Hill Island Formation (Antarctica) and Jagüel Formation (Argentina) by Mitidieri et al. (2026).
- Marx, Szasz & Lindgren (2026) determine heat transfer in elasmosaurid models reconstructed with and without a layer of insulating blubber, and argue that a peripheral blubber layer was necessary for elasmosaurids inhabiting cold water regions.
- O'Gorman, Scasso & Medina (2026) report the first discovery of fossil material of Tuarangisaurus keyesi from the Maastrichtian strata of the Lefipán Formation (Argentina).
- A new specimen of Kawanectes lafquenianus, providing new information on the skull anatomy in members of this species, is described from the Maastrichtian La Colonia Formation (Argentina) by O'Gorman, Matelo Mirco & Aspromonte (2026).
- Soto Acuña, Otero & Ortiz (2026) revise the fossil record of confirmed and purported polycotylids from the Upper Cretaceous strata from Chile, reinterpret some of the studied fossils as bones of elasmosaurids and hadrosauroid dinosaurs, and restrict known polycotylid record from Chile to the late Campanian to early Maastrichtian of the Magallanes Basin.
- Drumheller et al. (2026) report the discovery of a fish tooth embedded in a cervical vertebra of a specimen of Polycotylus latipinnis from the Cretaceous Mooreville Chalk (Alabama, United States), interpreted as likely evidence of an attack by Xiphactinus.

== Archosauromorphs ==
=== Other archosauromorphs ===
Name	Novelty	Status	Authors	Age	Type locality	Country	Notes	Images
Isodapedon	Gen. et sp. nov	Valid	Schiefelbein et al.	Late Triassic (Carnian)	Santa Maria Formation (Candelária Sequence)	Brazil	A hyperodapedontine rhynchosaur. The type species is I. varzealis.	
Primisuchus	Gen. et sp. nov		Datta et al.	Late Triassic	Upper Maleri Formation	India	A phytosaur belonging to the group Leptosuchomorpha. Genus includes new species P. gillettei.	
Silescelida	Gen. et sp. nov	Valid	Garcia et al.	Middle Triassic (Ladinian)	Santa Maria Formation (Pinheiros-Chiniquá Sequence)	Brazil	A eucrocopodan archosauriform with potential affinities to the Euparkeriidae. The type species is S. acristata.	
Simonettoia	Gen. et sp. nov	Valid	Renesto et al.	Late Triassic (Norian)	Dolomia di Forni Formation	Italy	A member of the family Tanystropheidae. The type species is S. tilaventina.	

==== Other archosauromorph research ====
- Kar & Sengupta (2026) conduct a taphofacies analysis of hyperodapedontine rhynchosaur specimens from the Upper Triassic Maleri Formation (Pranhita–Godavari Basin, India) using multivariate and spatial statistics, identifying five taphofacies and three taphofacies-lithofacies associations that reconstruct cycles of floodplain exposure, high-energy fluvial transport, and rapid burial.
- Sookias et al. (2026) study the diversification of Permian to Early Jurassic Archosauromorpha, reporting evidence of initial high speciation that decreased through time.
- Evidence from the study of the bone microstructure of archosauromorphs from the Lower Triassic strata from the Driefontein Farm 11 locality (South Africa), indicating that the studied assemblage includes as many as nine distinct taxa with diverse growth strategies encompassing both rapid and slow growth rates, is presented by Dollman et al. (2026); in a subsequent study Tolchard et al. (2026) interpret fragmentary humeri from the Driefontein 11 site as fossil material of a diverse archosauromorph assemblage with archosaurs, basal archosauriforms and basal archosauromorphs, including the first possible South African records of Azendohsauridae and Aphanosauria.
- Wang et al. (2026) describe the complete skeleton of Austronaga minuta from the Middle Triassic (Anisian) Guanling Formation (Yunnan, China), which preserves extensive soft tissues and provides evidence of skeletal adaptations to an aquatic lifestyle.
- Description of the skeletal anatomy of Tanystropheus conspicuus, based on data from abundant fossil material from the Ladinian strata from the Miedary site (Poland), is published by Rytel (2026).
- Spiekman et al. (2026) describe two new skulls of Howesia browni from the Triassic strata of the Cynognathus Assemblage Zone in the Burgersdorp Formation (South Africa), providing new information on the skull anatomy of members of this species, and interpret Eohyosaurus wolvaardti as a junior synonym of H. browni.
- A study on tooth plates and dentition of Late Triassic hyperodapedontine rhynchosaurs from Brazil, providing evidence of a dietary shift during their life history and of better adaptation of adults individuals to processing hard food compared to Middle Triassic rhynchosaurs, is published by Scartezini et al. (2026).
- Ponce et al. (2026) study the bone histology of Proterochampsa barrionuevoi, Tropidosuchus romeri, Gualosuchus reigi and Chanaresuchus bonapartei, providing evidence of diverse growth strategies of proterochampsids, and evidence interpreted as consistent with amphibious lifestyles of proterochampsine proterochampsids and more terrestrial habits of rhadinosuchines.
- Sarkar & Ray (2026) report evidence from the study of the bone histology of members of an assemblage of Colossosuchus techniensis from the Tiki Formation (India) indicative of an epidemic of persistent, recurrent bone disease in members of the studied community, likely resulting from a bacterial infection.
- Trinidad et al. (2026) study the bone histology of Late Triassic vertebrates (mostly archosauromorphs) from the Pebbly Arkose Formation (Zimbabwe), reporting evidence of frequent interrupted growth in rhynchosaurs and suchians as well as evidence of faster and more continuous growth in dinosaurs, and interpret the studied vertebrates as likely living in a more arid resource-poor environment with less seasonal variation compared to their contemporaries from assemblages from Argentina, Brazil and India.
- Marchetti & Klein (2026) name a new ichnotaxon Pachychirotherium gardenaensis on the basis of archosauriform footprints from the Permian strata from the Val Gardena Sandstone (Italy) and study the fossil record of footprints of early archosauriforms, interpreted as indicative of gradual changes of posture (with sprawling postures in the early members of the group and the fully erect posture likely evolving during the Middle Triassic) and of stepwise acquisition of digitigrady.

== Turtles ==
Name	Novelty	Status	Authors	Age	Type locality	Country	Notes	Images
Argillochelys foveopalatus	Sp. nov	Valid	Danilov et al.	Eocene (Bartonian)	Shorym Formation	Kazakhstan	A member of Pancheloniidae.	
Bartassochersis	Gen. et sp. nov	Valid	Szczygielski et al.	Late Triassic (Rhaetian)	Rhaetian Formation	France	A member of the family Proterochersidae. The type species is B. lopezi.	
Caesaria	Gen. et sp. nov	Valid	Spicher et al.	Late Jurassic (Tithonian)	Canjuers Lagerstätte	France	A member of Thalassochelydia. The type species is C. templaria.	
Chelodina aquanimare	Sp. nov	Valid	Joseph-Ouni, Yates & McCord	Miocene	Camfield Beds	Australia		
Chelodina nerophis	Sp. nov	Valid	Joseph-Ouni, Yates & McCord	Miocene	Camfield Beds	Australia		
Cryptochersis	Gen. et sp. nov	Valid	Szczygielski & Dróżdż	Late Triassic (Norian)	Fleming Fjord Formation	Greenland	A stem-turtle in the family Proterochersidae. The type species is C. paraxene.	
Gigantochelys	Gen. et sp. nov		Mousa, Tantawy & El-Kheir	Late Cretaceous (Maastrichtian)	Dakhla Formation	Egypt	A member of the family Dermochelyidae. The type species is G. aegyptiacus.	
Gokakelys	Gen. et sp. nov	Valid	Wilson Mantilla et al.	Cretaceous-Paleogene transition	Deccan Intertrappean Beds	India	A member of the family Bothremydidae. The type species is G. eos.	
Patagoniaemys aeschyli	Sp. nov	Valid	Agnolin et al.	Late Cretaceous (Maastrichtian)	Los Alamitos Formation	Argentina	A species of Patagoniaemys.	
Rafetus lysoni	Sp. nov	Valid	Joyce et al.	Early Oligocene	Brule Formation	United States (North Dakota)	A species of Rafetus.	
Sternotherus pugnatus	Sp. nov	Valid	Bourque	Miocene	Montbrook Fossil Site	United States (Florida)	A species of Sternotherus.	
Testudo sahakyanae	Sp. nov	Valid	Vlachos & Vasilyan	Pliocene		Armenia	A tortoise, a species of Testudo.	
Ypomonetikochelys	Gen. et sp. nov	Valid	Szczygielski & Dróżdż	Late Triassic (Norian)	Fleming Fjord Formation	Greenland	A stem-turtle in the family Proganochelyidae. The type species is C. euryaspis.	

=== Turtle research ===
- A study on the phylogenetic relationships of turtles, supporting their affinities with archosaurs and recovering Eunotosaurus as a millerettid unrelated to turtles, is published by Jenkins et al. (2026).
- Review of research from preceding years on the systematics of turtles is published by Evers & Joyce (2026).
- Shvets et al. (2026) describe new fossils of turtles from the Lower Cretaceous (Valanginian) Murtoi Formation (Buryatia, Russia), including new fossil material of Kirgizemys dmitrievi providing new information on the anatomy of the species, and study the phylogenetic relationships of sinemydid/macrobaenid turtles.
- A study on the shell bone histology of members of the genus Prochelidella from the Cretaceous of Patagonia is published by Jannello et al. (2026).
- Cadena et al. (2026) describe new fossil material of Chelus colombiana from the Miocene strata of the Ipururo and Pebas formations (Peru), including one of the largest specimens assigned to this species reported to date, and extending known distribution of the species to the southwestern margins of the Pebas wetland system.
- Sarda & Maniel (2026) describe new fossil material of Elkanemys caelestis from the Upper Cretaceous Portezuelo Formation (Argentina), providing new information on the morphological variability of members of this species.
- A study on the neuroanatomy of Zolhafah bella is published by Martín-Jiménez & Pérez-García (2026).
- Pérez-García et al. (2026) revise Neochelys arribasi, and support its recognition as a valid species.
- Jasinski et al. (2026) revise the taxonomy of the genus Compsemys, identifying three species from the Late Cretaceous and Paleogene strata from North America.
- Description and a study on the variability of the skull and mandible anatomy of Plesiobaena antiqua is published by Bellotti et al. (2026).
- Tong et al. (2026) describe indeterminate trionychoid remains with similarities to Basilochelys macrobios from the Lower Cretaceous strata from Koh Moul, representing the first record of a Mesozoic turtle from Cambodia.
- A study on the anatomy and affinities of Allaeochelys crassesculpta is published by Rollot et al. (2026).
- Pathological bone modifications consistent with an advanced osteomyelitis are reported in carettochelyid plates of from the Miocene Moghra Formation (Egypt) by Guerrero et al. (2026).
- Joyce, Girard & Lyson (2026) interpret Helopanoplia distincta and "Aspideretes" beecheri as synonymous, resulting in a new combination Helopanoplia beecheri.
- Pochat-Cottilloux et al. (2026) report the first discovery of trionychid fossil material (including Trionyx cf. vindobonensis) from the Miocene strata of Poland, interpreted as indicative of environmental conditions suitable for animals requiring high temperatures between the Middle Miocene Climatic Optimum and Late Miocene in the studied area.
- Chatterji, Hutchinson & Jones (2026) study the phylogenetic relationships and biogeography of extant and fossil sea turtle groups, recovering Protostegidae as the sister group to the rest of Pan-Chelonioidea, and reporting evidence of North Atlantic origin of Chelonioidea.
- Footprint traces interpreted as likely produced by a stampede of sea turtles panicked by an earthquake are reported from the Campanian strata from Monte Cònero (Italy) by Sandroni et al. (2026).
- A study on the composition of the sea turtle assemblage from the Maastrichtian strata from the vicinity of the farmstead Rasstrigin (Volgograd Oblast, Russia) is published by Danilov et al. (2026).
- The first post-Cretaceous sea turtle remains from central Chile are reported from the Eocene strata of the Algarrobo beds by Otero et al. (2026).
- A fossil humerus interpreted as the first known fossil record of the extant leatherback sea turtle is described from the Pleistocene strata from Taiwan by Liaw & Tsai (2026).
- A late Pleistocene humerus with diagnostic character states seen in extant green sea turtle, representing the first record of a sea turtle from Quaternary strata from southeastern Atlantic margin, is described from Punta Médanos (Buenos Aires Province, Argentina) by Mársico Fettolini, Agnolin & Vezzosi (2026).
- Evidence of exploitation of European pond turtles by Neanderthals occupying the Neumark-Nord site (Germany) during the Last Interglacial is presented by Gaudzinski-Windheuser et al. (2026).
- A study on the skull anatomy of Echmatemys, interpreted as consistent with affinities with extant members of the genus Mauremys, is published by Bever & Vlachos (2026).
- Helm et al. (2026) report the discovery of new tortoise tracks from the Pleistocene strata of the Waenhuiskrans Formation (South Africa), including new trace fossil evidence of presence of a Pleistocene tortoise larger than extant tortoises from southern Africa.
- Cordelier & Tabouelle (2026) describe subfossil remains of members of the genus Cylindraspis from the collection of Paul Carié, and identify possible new diagnostic character in the skulls of members of the genus for distinguishing its species; in a subsequent study Cordelier et al. (2026) use paleoproteomic analyses to provide species identification of remains of the saddle-backed Mauritius giant tortoise and the domed Mauritius giant tortoise, and validate a new morphological diagnostic criterion in the cranial region of the studied tortoises.
- Evidence of variability of the microanatomy of shell fragments of fossil Aldabrachelys sp. is provided by Herter et al. (2026).
- Vélez-Juarbe et al. (2026) identify fossil material of a medium-sized member of the genus Chelonoidis from the Quaternary strata from the Puerto Rico Bank.
- Hermanson & Evers (2026) report evidence of higher survivorship of durophagous turtles during the Cretaceous–Paleogene extinction event compared to other turtles.

== Other reptiles ==
Name	Novelty	Status	Authors	Age	Type locality	Country	Notes	Images
Meilynodraco	Gen. et sp. nov	Valid	Scheyer et al.	Late Jurassic (Kimmeridgian)	Morrison Formation	United States (Wyoming)	An early-diverging choristodere. The type species is M. amonamarthi.	
Pentacolophon	Gen. et sp. nov	Valid	Pinheiro et al.	Early Triassic	Katberg Formation	South Africa	A member or the family Procolophonidae. The type species is P. winterbergensis.	
Sauropia	Gen. et sp. nov	Valid	Müller et al.	Middle Triassic (Ladinian)	Pinheiros-Chiniquá Sequence of the Santa Maria Supersequence	Brazil	A member or relative of the family Procolophonidae. The type species is S. macrorhinus.	
Scyllacerta	Gen. et sp. nov	Valid	Jenkins et al.	Late Permian	Teekloof Formation (Endothiodon Assemblage Zone)	South Africa	A younginid. The type species is S. creanae.	

=== Other reptile research ===
- Pal et al. (2026) describe several distinct vertebrate coprolite ichnotaxa, some of which contain fish scales, in addition to putative archosauromorph humeri from the Early Triassic Panchet Formation (India).
- Reisz et al. (2026) report the discovery of a mummified specimen of Captorhinus from the Permian strata from the Richards Spur locality (Oklahoma, United States), preserved with three-dimensional skin, protein remains and with cartilages of the ribcage.
- Marchetti et al. (2026) report the discovery of resting trace with a probable bolosaurian skin impression from the Permian (Asselian) Goldlauter Formation (Germany), including a probable cloacal vent impression and the oldest definite impression of epidermal scales of a reptile reported to date, and name a new ichnotaxon Cabarzichnus pulchrus.
- D'Ávila Burgardt et al. (2026) report the discovery of a new procolophonid lower jaw from the Lower Triassic Sanga do Cabral Formation (Brazil), differing from known procolophonid taxa from the site in dental morphology.
- Description and revision of pareiasaur osteoderms from the late Permian localities in Eastern Europe is published by Boyarinova & Golubev (2026).
- The first confirmed fossil material of Pareiasaurus serridens from the Ruhuhu Basin is reported from the Permian strata of the Usili Formation (Tanzania) by Maisch (2026).
- Information on the inner ear anatomy of Eunotosaurus africanus is provided by Evers et al. (2026), who recognize similarities with both early neodiapsids and early turtles.
- Matsumoto, Manabe & Evans (2026) describe new fossil material of members of Choristodera from the Lower Cretaceous Okurodani Formation (Japan), expanding known diversity of members of the group from the studied formation.
- Qi et al. (2026) study the morphology and bone histology of the specimen of Xinpusaurus from the Upper Triassic Xiaowa Formation (Guizhou, China) described by He et al. (2023), and support the interpretation of the studied specimen as a juvenile of X. suni rather than a representative of a distinct thalattosaur taxon.
- Karapunar et al. (2026) report the discovery of new fossil material of marine vertebrates from the Permian and Triassic strata of the Bellerophon and Werfen formations (Italy), including fossil material of a probable member of the family Saurosphargidae from the Lower Triassic strata of the Val Badia Member of the Werfen Formation, representing one of the oldest records of the group reported to date.

== Reptiles in general ==
- Review of research from preceding years on the phylogenetic affinities of Permian and Triassic early-diverging members of main lineages within the crown group of reptiles and close relatives of the crown group is published by Spiekman & Ezcurra (2026).
- A study on the diversity and evolution of the parietal foramen in Paleozoic and Triassic reptiles and synapsids is published by Jenkins et al. (2026).
- Evidence supporting the presence of extraoral tissues ("lips") similar to those seen in extant lepidosaurs in Triassic pseudosuchians and dinosaurs from southern Brazil is presented by Terras et al. (2026), who interpret the presence of "lips" in the form of labial scales associated with extensive gingiva covering the teeth as likely to be the plesiomorphic condition in Sauropsida.
- Evidence of morphological diversity of beaks of turtles and archosauromorphs throughout the Permian-Triassic transition, as well as evidence of different function of beaks of contemporary turtles, archosauromorphs and dicynodonts that were likely linked to different feeding behaviors, is presented by Landi et al. (2026).
- A study on the age of the Lusitaniadalen Member of the Vikinghøgda Formation (Norway) is published by Kear et al. (2026), who constrain the oldest known oceanic reptiles described on the basis of fossils preserved in the studied formation as living approximately 1.24−2.63 million years after the Permian–Triassic extinction event.
- Yao et al. (2026) reconstruct evolution of the ecospace structure of marine reptile faunas from southern China during the Triassic.
- Evidence from the study of coprolites from the Lower Triassic Nanlinghu Formation (China), indicative of a diversified dietary spectrum in marine reptiles from the Chaohu Fauna, is presented by Yao et al. (2026).
- Numberger-Thuy et al. (2026) describe fossil material of a diverse reptile assemblage from the Rhaetian strata of the Exter Formation (Germany), including fossils of Pachystropheus, ?Kuehneosaurus, pterosaurs, theropod dinosaurs, a small crocodylomorph, late-surviving phytosaurs, the youngest well-dated aetosaur material reported to date and a probable lepidosaur tooth with grooves which might be evidence of presence of a venom delivery system.
- Olsen & McDonald (2026) revise the fossil record of vertebrate (mostly reptilian) trace fossils from the Triassic-Jurassic strata in the Newark Supergroup, and divide them into temporally limited assemblages.
- Cotton, Dreyer & Delsett (2026) describe an ichthyosaur vertebral centrum and rib fragments of an unknown marine reptile (possibly a plesiosaur) from Denmark, interpreted as most likely originating from Jurassic outcrops in the Skagerrak–North Sea region and subsequently transported by Pleistocene glaciers.
- An ichthyosaur vertebra punctured by a large tooth of Pliosaurus, of uncertain provenance but likely originating from the Upper Jurassic strata from England (United Kingdom), is described by Gordon, Serafini & Brinkman (2026), providing direct evidence of trophic interactions between ichthyosaurs and pliosaurs.
- Evidence of differences of biting mechanics of Late Cretaceous mosasaurs and polycotylid plesiosaurs from the Western Interior Seaway is presented by Della Giustina et al. (2026).
- Bateman, Demers-Potvin & Larsson (2026) compare reconstructed jaw adductor musculature and feeding performances of Champsosaurus lindoei and Leidyosuchus canadensis, interpreted as suggestive of dietary resource partitioning between the two taxa.
- A study on turtle fossils from the Paleocene Santa Lucía Formation (Bolivia), providing evidence of presence of trace fossils resulting from predation or scavenging by crocodyliforms, as well as probable trace fossil evidence of invertebrate parasitism, is published by Wilson et al. (2026).
- New fossil material of reptiles, including a member of the genus Chalcides that might be distinct from the morphotype reported from Miocene sites in Central and Eastern Europe and Central Asia, as well as a possible post-Eocene record of Pyrenasaurus, is described from the Miocene strata of the Ribesalbes-Alcora Basin (Spain) by Marquina-Blasco et al. (2026).
- Evidence from the study of body size of reptiles from the Shungura Formation (Ethiopia), indicative of temporal coincidence between changes of maximum body size of members of the studied assemblage and local environmental changes (including changes in hydrological regimes and evaporation levels), is presented by Parker et al. (2026).
- A study on turtle and crocodilian fossils in the vertebrate assemblage from the Ravina das Araras (Rio Grande do Norte, Brazil), interpreted as consistent with presence of temporary bodies of water in a landscape dominated by open habitats during the late Quaternary, is published by Costa et al. (2026).
- A second specimen of Yaverlandia bitholus is described by Naish & Sweetman (2026), who consider the dinosaurian affinities of the taxon to be questionable.
- A study on the columellar morphology in extant reptiles (including birds) and non-avian dinosaurs, providing evidence of impact of both ecological adaptation and phylogenetic constraints on reptilian columellar diversity, is published by Peacock et al. (2026).
- Roberts & Head (2026) report evidence from the study of vertebral morphology of extant and extinct reptiles indicative of at least four independent emergences of presacral vertebral columns made up of four regions in amniotes, of overall association of reptile body size with heterogeneity of the vertebral column in reptiles, and of elevated heterogeneity of the vertebral column relative of the body size in volant taxa.
