= Airistagiz =

Airistagiz Temporal range: Middle Triassic, Ladinian

Scientific classification
- Kingdom: Animalia
- Phylum: Chordata
- Class: Reptilia
- Clade: Lepidosauromorpha
- Genus: †Airistagiz; Sobral & Schoch, 2026
- Species: †A. seegisi

Binomial name
- †Airistagiz seegisi Sobral & Schoch, 2026

Genus of extinct reptiles

Airistagiz (lit. 'earliest lizard') is an extinct genus of early lepidosauromorph (lizard-line reptile) known from the Middle Triassic (Ladinian age) Erfurt Formation of Germany. The genus contains a single species, Airistagiz seegisi, known from two partial skulls, one of which is associated with a fragmentary postcranial skeleton including a forelimb, partial pelvis, and vertebrae. It is one of many Triassic stem group-lepidosaurs known from the Vellberg region, in addition to Hohlachia and Klainjosaura (named in the same publication as Airistagiz) and the earlier-described Wirtembergia, Fraxinisaura, Vellbergia, and possibly the enigmatic Stauromatodon.

== Discovery and naming ==
The Airistagiz fossil material was discovered in the Schumann limestone quarry, representing outcrops of the Erfurt Formation (also called the Lower Keuper) in Vellberg of Baden-Württemberg, Germany. Airistagiz is known from two specimens, both of which are permanently accessioned in the State Museum of Natural History Stuttgart in Stuttgart. SMNS 91319 comprises a partial skull, including both parietals and frontals, part of the prefrontals, and the right postfrontal, postorbital, jugal, maxilla, and premaxilla. SMNS 91110 (A and B) is preserved as a part and counterpart and also preserves part of a skull. The main part (A) includes the left prefrontal, frontal, postfrontal, and postorbital, both mandibles, much of the left forelimb (humerus, radius, ulna, and partial hand elements), the left ilium (pelvic bone), and vertebrae. The counterpart (B) preserves an incomplete squamosal and the impression of the mandible.

In 2026, Gabriela Sobral and Rainer R. Schoch described Airistagiz seegisi as a new genus and species of early lepidosauromorph based on these fossil remains, establishing SMNS 91319 as the holotype specimen. The generic name, Airistagiz, combines the Proto-Germanic words airist, meaning 'earliest' and 'foremost', and agiz, meaning 'lizard'. This name was chosen in reference to the holotype specimen representing the first fossil reptile material to be discovered in the type locality. The specific name, seegisi, honours Dieter Seegis and his contributions to research in Triassic faunal assemblages and stratigraphy.

== Classification ==
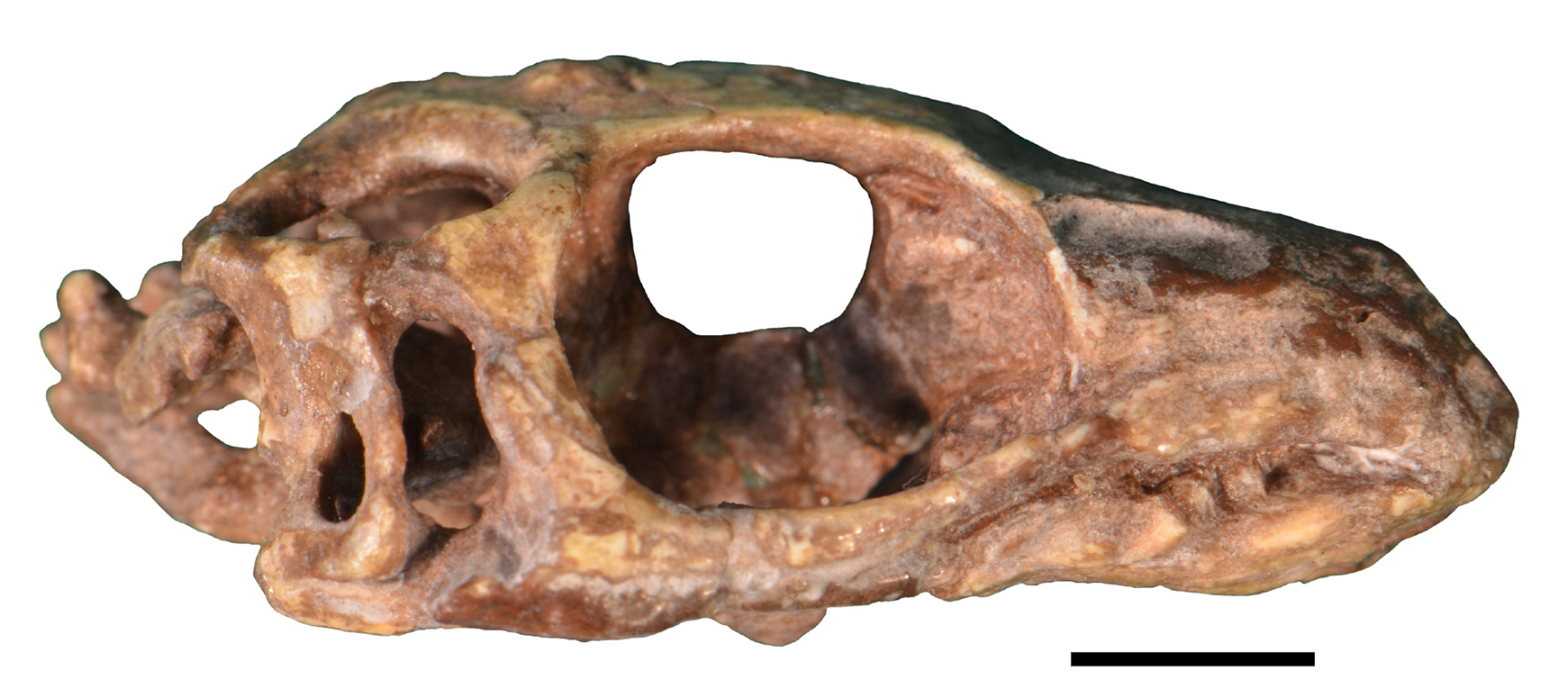
Skull of fellow early lepidosauromorph Paliguana whitei

To test the affinities and relationships of Airistagiz and some other Vellberg reptiles, Sobral and Schoch (2026) incorporated them into an updated version of the phylogenetic matrix of Ford et al. (2021). While the larger-scale relationships and tree topology shifted depending on the setting and methods used in the phylogenetic analyses performed, Airistagiz was consistently recovered as the sister taxon to fellow Vellberg reptile Hohlachia. Together, these two taxa were generally placed at the base of Lepidosauromorpha, the clade containing Lepidosauria—lizards and snakes (Squamata) and the tuatara and its relatives (Rhynchocephalia)—and its extinct, stem-group members. In the authors' better-resolved strict consensus trees, the Early Triassic Paliguana from South Africa was recovered as the basalmost lepidosauromorph, followed by the clade containing Airistagiz and Hohlachia. Their strict consensus tree including Taytalura, a Late Triassic lepidosauromorph from Argentina, recovered the next evolutionary split as the lepidosaur divergence between rhynchocephalians and Pan-Squamata. These results are displayed in the cladogram below, with Vellberg lepidosauromorphs highlighted.

- Sauria
  - Archosauromorpha
  - Lepidosauromorpha
    - †Paliguana whitei
    - - - †Airistagiz seegisi
        - †Hohlachia multidens
      - Lepidosauria
        - Rhynchocephalia
          - †Taytalura alcoberi
          - - - †Diphydontosaurus avonis
              - †Gephyrosaurus bridensis
            - - Sphenodontia
        - Pan-Squamata
          - - †Vellbergia bartholomaei
            - - †Fraxinisaura rozynekae
              - †Marmoretta oxoniensis
          - - †Sophineta cracoviensis
            - - †Megachirella wachtleri
              - Squamata

Vellberg lepidosauromorphs
