= Madatyphlops cariei =

Conservation status
- Extinct (IUCN 3.1)

Scientific classification
- Kingdom: Animalia
- Phylum: Chordata
- Class: Reptilia
- Order: Squamata
- Suborder: Serpentes
- Family: Typhlopidae
- Genus: Madatyphlops
- Species: †M. cariei

Binomial name
- †Madatyphlops cariei Hoffstetter, 1946

Synonyms
- Typhlops cariei

Extinct species of snake

Madatyphlops cariei, commonly known as Hoffstetter's blind snake, is an extinct blind snake species which was endemic to Mauritius. It is named for Paul Carié (1876–1930), an amateur naturalist attached to the Museum national d'Histoire naturelle, who made excavations in Mare aux Songes around 1900 where the remains of this species were discovered.

== Description ==
It is known only from seven fossil vertebrae from the middle region of the trunk, including two sets of connected vertebra and one isolated vertebra. With an estimated length of more than 200 mm it was significantly larger than Ramphotyphlops braminus, a blind snake which still occurs on Mauritius. T. cariei was also distinct by various characters of the vertebral morphology.

== Extinction ==
This species was classified as extinct in the IUCN Red List of Threatened Species in 1994. It disappeared apparently in the 17th century following the introduction of predatory species to Mauritius.
