= Hohlachia =

Hohlachia Temporal range: Middle Triassic, Ladinian

Scientific classification
- Kingdom: Animalia
- Phylum: Chordata
- Class: Reptilia
- Clade: Lepidosauromorpha
- Genus: †Hohlachia; Sobral & Schoch, 2026
- Species: †H. multidens

Binomial name
- †Hohlachia multidens Sobral & Schoch, 2026

Genus of extinct reptiles

Hohlachia is an extinct genus of early lepidosauromorph (lizard-line reptile) known from the Middle Triassic (Ladinian age) Erfurt Formation of Germany. The genus contains a single species, Hohlachia multidens, known from a partial skull and associated limb bones. It is one of many Triassic stem group-lepidosaurs known from the Vellberg region, in addition to Airistagiz and Klainjosaura (named in the same publication as Hohlachia) and the earlier-described Wirtembergia, Fraxinisaura, Vellbergia, and possibly the enigmatic Stauromatodon.

== Discovery and naming ==
The Hohlachia fossil material was discovered in the Schumann limestone quarry, representing outcrops of the Erfurt Formation (also called the Lower Keuper) in Vellberg of Baden-Württemberg, Germany. The specimen is housed in the State Museum of Natural History Stuttgart in Stuttgart, where it is permanently accessioned as specimen SMNS 91270. The specimen consists of a partial skull (right frontal and left maxilla, dentary, and pterygoid), a left humerus, two right humeri, and the proximal part of a right femur.

In 2026, Gabriela Sobral and Rainer R. Schoch described Hohlachia multidens as a new genus and species of early lepidosauromorph based on these fossil remains, establishing SMNS 91270 as the holotype specimen. The generic name, Hohlachia, is a medieval variant of a word referencing the House of Hohenlohe, the name of the dynasty eventually expanded to cover what is now the northern Württemberg area, where the fossil was found. The specific name, multidens, combines the Latin words multus, meaning 'more', and dens, meaning 'tooth', in reference to the high maxillary tooth count compared to related taxa from the Vellberg region.

== Classification ==
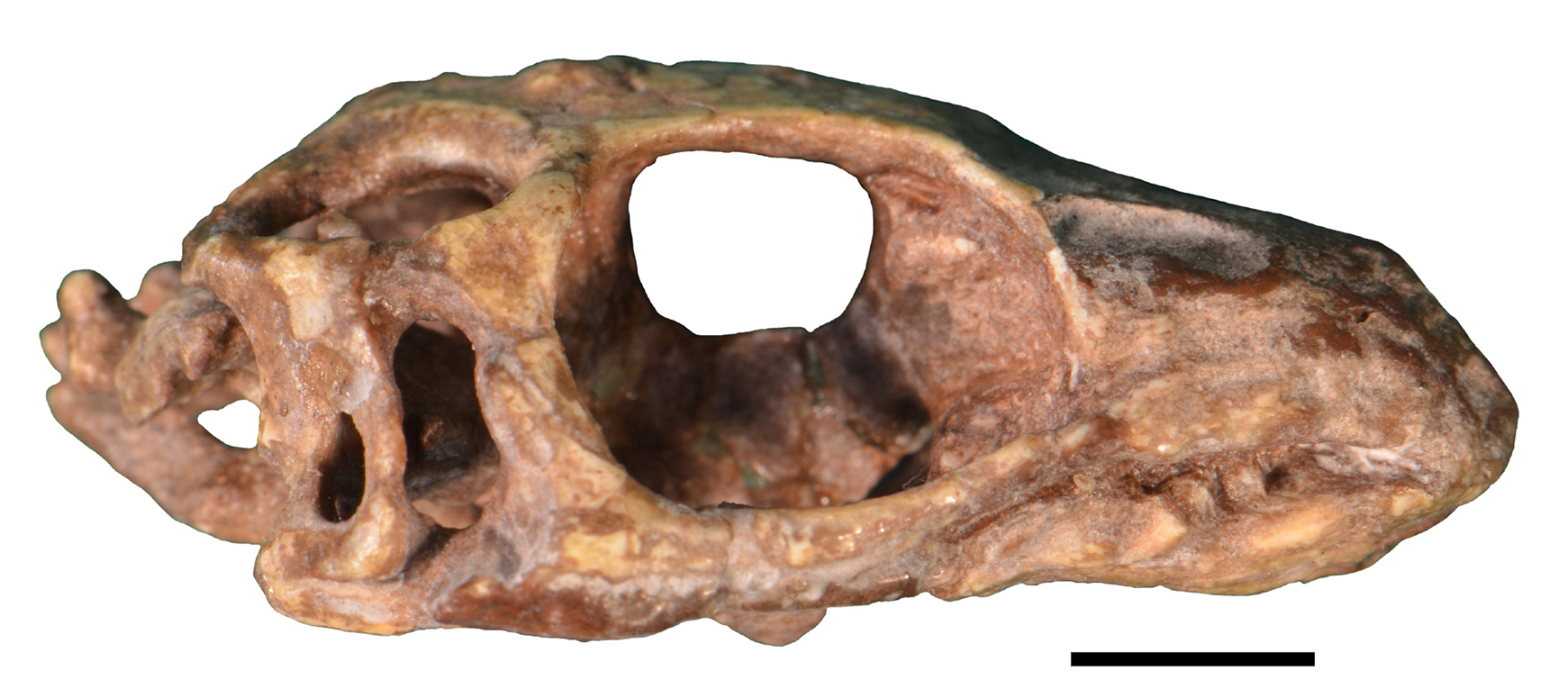
Skull of fellow early lepidosauromorph Paliguana whitei

To test the affinities and relationships of Hohlachia and some other Vellberg reptiles, Sobral and Schoch (2026) incorporated them into an updated version of the phylogenetic matrix of Ford et al. (2021). While the larger-scale relationships and tree topology shifted depending on the setting and methods used in the phylogenetic analyses performed, Hohlachia was consistently recovered as the sister taxon to fellow Vellberg reptile Airistagiz. Together, these two taxa were generally placed at the base of Lepidosauromorpha, the clade containing Lepidosauria—lizards and snakes (Squamata) and the tuatara and its relatives (Rhynchocephalia)—and its extinct, stem-group members. In the authors' better-resolved strict consensus trees, the Early Triassic Paliguana from South Africa was recovered as the basalmost lepidosauromorph, followed by the clade containing Hohlachia and Airistagiz. Their strict consensus tree including Taytalura, a Late Triassic lepidosauromorph from Argentina, recovered the next evolutionary split as the lepidosaur divergence between rhynchocephalians and Pan-Squamata. These results are displayed in the cladogram below, with Vellberg lepidosauromorphs highlighted.

- Sauria
  - Archosauromorpha
  - Lepidosauromorpha
    - †Paliguana whitei
    - - - †Airistagiz seegisi
        - †Hohlachia multidens
      - Lepidosauria
        - Rhynchocephalia
          - †Taytalura alcoberi
          - - - †Diphydontosaurus avonis
              - †Gephyrosaurus bridensis
            - - Sphenodontia
        - Pan-Squamata
          - - †Vellbergia bartholomaei
            - - †Fraxinisaura rozynekae
              - †Marmoretta oxoniensis
          - - †Sophineta cracoviensis
            - - †Megachirella wachtleri
              - Squamata

Vellberg lepidosauromorphs
