= Parapalaeophis =

Parapalaeophis Temporal range: Paleocene, late Danian

Scientific classification
- Kingdom: Animalia
- Phylum: Chordata
- Class: Reptilia
- Order: Squamata
- Suborder: Serpentes
- Infraorder: Alethinophidia
- Family: incertae sedis
- Genus: †Parapalaeophis; Natarajan & Klompmaker, 2026
- Species: †P. jeffshawi

Binomial name
- †Parapalaeophis jeffshawi Natarajan & Klompmaker, 2026

Genus of extinct snake

Parapalaeophis (lit. 'near Palaeophis') is an extinct genus of aquatic snake known from the Paleocene (Danian age) Porters Creek Formation of Alabama, United States. The genus contains a single species, Parapalaeophis jeffshawi, known from several associated vertebrae. These bones show similarities to the extinct aquatic snake families Palaeophiidae and Nigerophiidae, but these features, combined with other unique characteristics, make the precise classification of Parapalaeophis uncertain.

== Discovery and naming ==
The Parapalaeophis fossil material was discovered in outcrops of the lower Porters Creek Formation (UAMRC loc. 5) in Sumter County, Alabama, United States. The specimen is housed in the University of Alabama Museums Research & Collections (paleontology collection), where it is permanently accessioned as specimen UAMRC:Paleo:21813. It consists of seven associated vertebrae from the pre-cloacal region of the spinal column.

In 2026, Abhishek Natarajan and Adiël A. Klompmaker described Parapalaeophis jeffshawi as a new genus and species of aquatic snake based on these fossil remains, establishing UAMRC:Paleo:21813 as the holotype specimen. The generic name, Parapalaeophis, literally means "beside" or "near" Palaeophis, referencing the similarities between the two extinct genera. The specific name, jeffshawi, honors Jeff Shaw and his assistance in accessing the rock layers where the holotype was found.
