= Cabarzichnus =

Cabarzichnus Temporal range: Early Permian, Asselian

Trace fossil classification
- Ichnogenus: Cabarzichnus; Marchetti et al., 2026

Type ichnospecies
- †Cabarzichnus pulchrus Marchetti et al., 2026

Ichnogenus of early reptile traces

Cabarzichnus is an ichnogenus representing the resting trace of an early stem-reptile. The ichnogenus contains a single ichnospecies, Cabarzichnus pulchrus, described in 2026 from prints found in the Early Permian (Asselian age) Goldlauter Formation of Germany. It is known from two specimens, showing an elongate trunk with a sub-horizontal cloacal vent impression, slender forelimbs, and a long tail. The impressions are associated with Varanopus microdactylus footprints, produced by the same individual. The tracks were likely produced by a bolosaurian like Eudibamus, the skeletal proportions of which closely match the Cabarzichnus traces. This ichnotaxon represents the oldest known occurrence of reptilian epidermal scales in the fossil record, as well as the most complete body impression produce by a Paleozoic stem-reptile.
