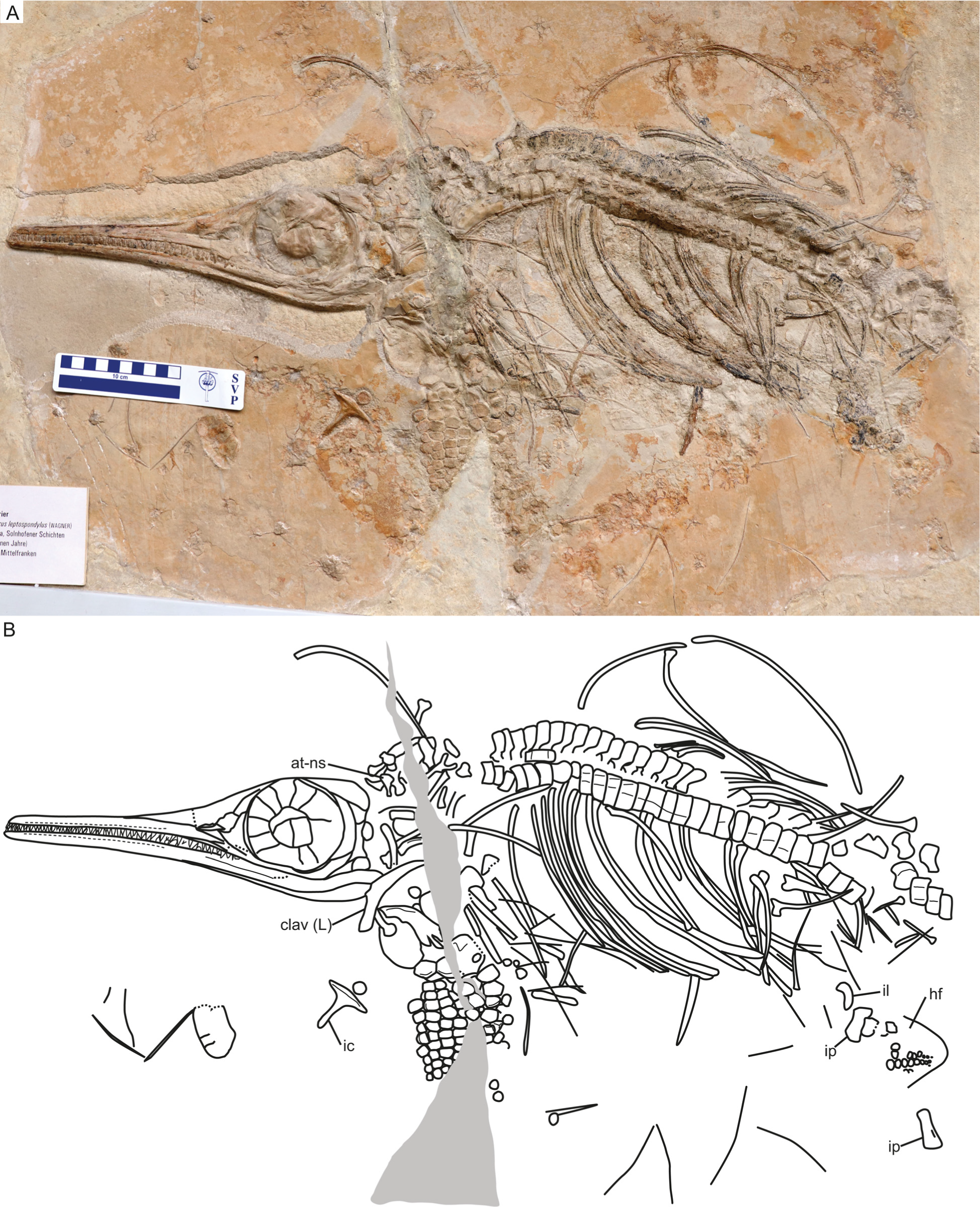
- Holotype specimen of J. tethyensis

Scientific classification
- Kingdom: Animalia
- Phylum: Chordata
- Class: Reptilia
- Order: †Ichthyosauria
- Family: †Ophthalmosauridae
- Genus: †Jabalisaurus; Barrientos-Lara & Alvarado-Ortega, 2021

Type species
- †Jabalisaurus meztli Barrientos-Lara & Alvarado-Ortega, 2021

Other species
- †Jabalisaurus tethyensis Maxwell et al., 2026

= Jabalisaurus =

Jabalisaurus Temporal range: Late Jurassic

Genus of ichthyosaurs

Jabalisaurus is an extinct genus of ophthalmosaurid ichthyosaurs known from Late Jurassic rocks of Mexico and Germany. The genus contains two species. The type species, Jabalisaurus meztli, was described in 2021 based on a single specimen from the La Casita Formation of Mexico. It had initially been identified as Ophthalmosaurus cf. icenicus. A second species, Jabalisaurus tethyensis, was described in 2026 based on three specimens from the Altmühltal Formation of Germany. One of these, JME-SOS-08369, is a complete, articulated skeleton encased in soft tissue. It was described previously in 2022 and identified as Aegirosaurus sp.

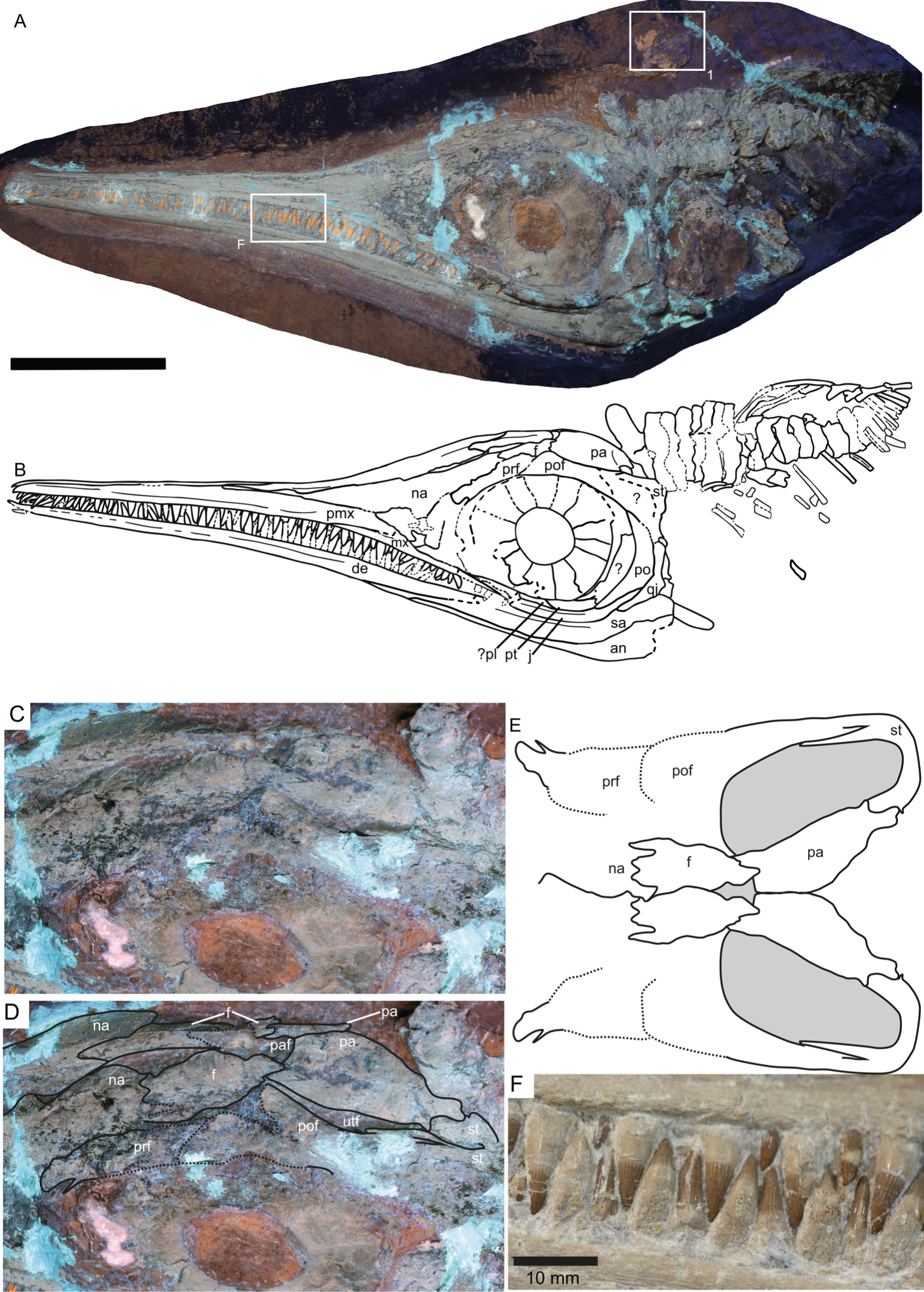
SMNS 54067, a skull referred to J. tethyensis

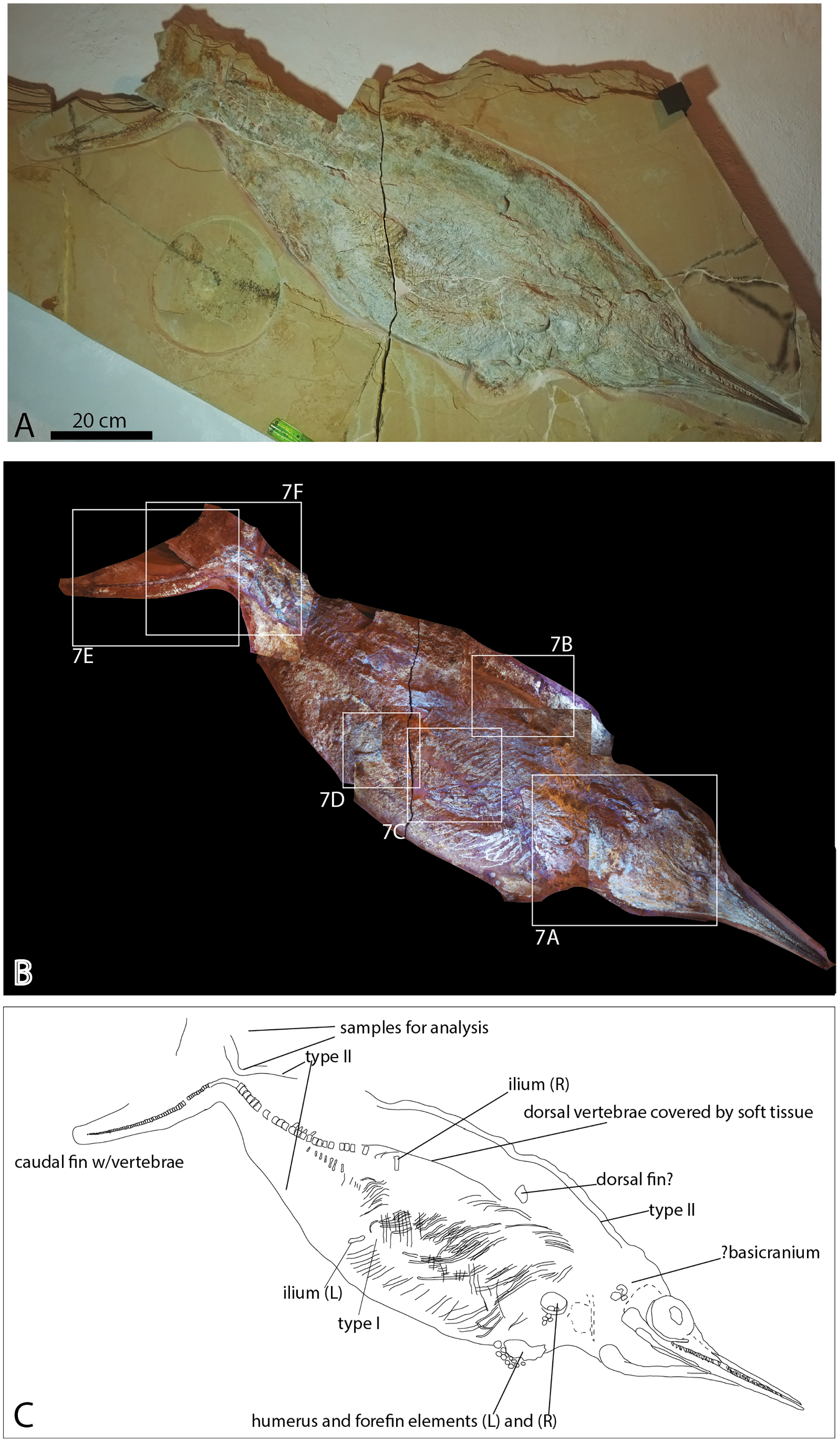
JME-SOS-08369, the 'mummified' specimen of J. tethyensis

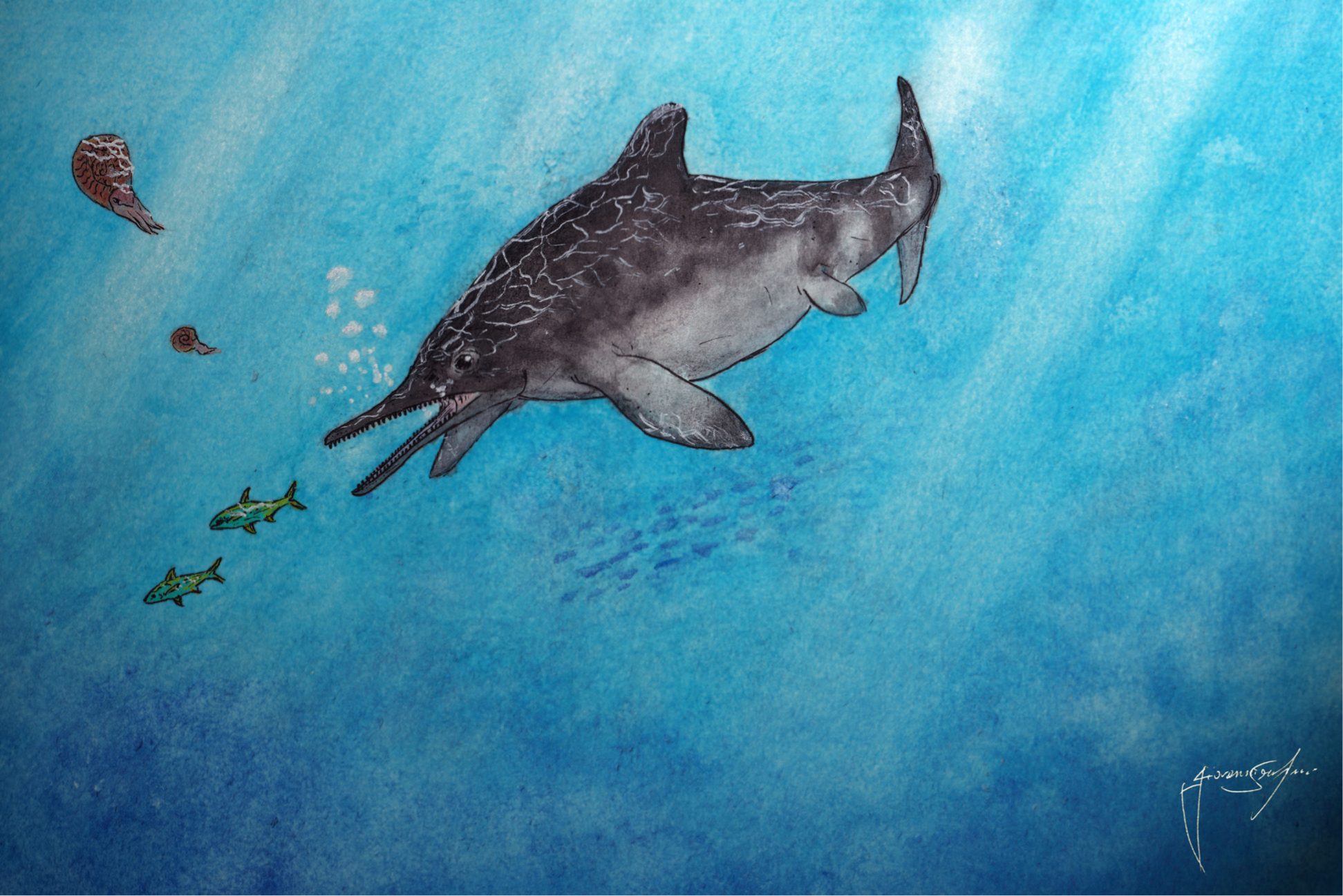
Life restoration of J. tethyensis
