= Gigantochelys =

Gigantochelys Temporal range: Late Cretaceous, Maastrichtian

Scientific classification
- Kingdom: Animalia
- Phylum: Chordata
- Class: Reptilia
- Order: Testudines
- Suborder: Cryptodira
- Family: Dermochelyidae
- Genus: †Gigantochelys; Mousa et al., 2026
- Species: †G. aegyptiacus

Binomial name
- †Gigantochelys aegyptiacus Mousa et al., 2026

Genus of extinct turtle

Gigantochelys (lit. 'giant turtle') is an extinct genus of large sea turtle in the family Dermochelyidae known from the Late Cretaceous (Maastrichtian age) Dakhla Formation of Egypt. The genus contains a single species, Gigantochelys aegyptiacus, known from bones of the pelvis. The forelimbs were likely the primary source of propulsion when swimming, but the iliac blade morphology and the robust pubic process of this species indicate that the hindlimbs were likely used more for propulsion than in the leatherback sea turtle, an extant (modern) dermochelyid.

== Discovery and naming ==
Gigantochelys was discovered in the Dakhla Oasis of Egypt

The Gigantochelys fossil material was discovered in outcrops of the Dakhla Formation (horizon III, Beris Member) in the Dakhla Oasis in the Western Desert of Egypt. The specimen is housed at the New Valley Vertebrate Paleontology Center in New Valley Governorate, where it is permanently accessioned as specimen NVP 039. The specimen consists of much of the pelvic girdle; the right side is complete and generally well preserved, with the pubis and ischium found in anatomical articulation and the ilium found isolated nearby. The left side was also found, albeit in poorer condition due to weathering and erosion. The entire specimen exhibits re-permineralization from gypsum crystals.

In 2026, Mohamed K. Mousa, Abdel Aziz A. Tantawy, and Gebely A. Abu El-Kheir described Gigantochelys aegyptiacus as a new genus and species of dermochelyid sea turtle based on these fossil remains, establishing NVP 039 as the holotype specimen. The generic name, Gigantochelys, combines the Latin roots giganto, meaning 'giant', and chelys, meaning 'turtle'. The specific name, aegyptiacus, refers to the discovery of the species in Egypt.
