= Klainjosaura =

Klainjosaura Temporal range: Middle Triassic, Ladinian

Scientific classification
- Kingdom: Animalia
- Phylum: Chordata
- Class: Reptilia
- Clade: Lepidosauromorpha
- Genus: †Klainjosaura; Sobral & Schoch, 2026
- Species: †K. staroskalja

Binomial name
- †Klainjosaura staroskalja Sobral & Schoch, 2026

Genus of extinct reptiles

Klainjosaura (lit. 'small lizard') is an extinct genus of early lepidosauromorph (lizard-line reptile) known from the Middle Triassic (Ladinian age) Erfurt Formation of Germany. The genus contains a single species, Klainjosaura staroskalja, known from a fragmentary skull. It is one of many Triassic stem group-lepidosaurs known from the Vellberg region, in addition to Airistagiz and Hohlachia (named in the same publication as Klainjosaura) and the earlier-described Wirtembergia, Fraxinisaura, Vellbergia, and possibly the enigmatic Stauromatodon.

== Discovery and naming ==
The Klainjosaura fossil material was discovered in the Schumann limestone quarry, representing outcrops of the Erfurt Formation (also called the Lower Keuper) in Vellberg of Baden-Württemberg, Germany. The specimen is housed in the State Museum of Natural History Stuttgart in Stuttgart, where it is permanently accessioned as specimen SMNS 91643. The specimen consists of three disarticulated skull bones: a frontal, squamosal, and partial left dentary.

In 2026, Gabriela Sobral and Rainer R. Schoch described Klainjosaura staroskalja as a new genus and species of early lepidosauromorph based on these fossil remains, establishing SMNS 91643 as the holotype specimen. The generic name, Klainjosaura, combines the Proto-Germanic word klainja, meaning 'small', with the Ancient Greek σαῦρος (sauros), meaning 'lizard'. The specific name, staroskalja, combines the Proto-Germanic words staraz, meaning 'stiff', and skaljō, meaning 'scale', in reference to the immobile structure observed in the squamosal.
