= Maleri Formation =

Maleri Formation may refer to:

- Upper Maleri Formation, Late Triassic formation in India
- Lower Maleri Formation, Late Triassic formation in India
