= Lavergnesaurus =

Lavergnesaurus Temporal range: Bartonian

Scientific classification
- Kingdom: Animalia
- Phylum: Chordata
- Class: Reptilia
- Order: Squamata
- Family: Scincidae
- Genus: †Lavergnesaurus
- Species: †L. lamarcki

Binomial name
- †Lavergnesaurus lamarcki Čerňanský et al., 2026

Extinct genus of scincid lizard

Lavergnesaurus is an extinct monotypic genus of scincid lizard that lived in France during the Bartonian stage of the Eocene epoch.

== Etymology ==
The generic name Lavergnesaurus is derived from the locality of Lavergne in France and from the Greek word saura, meaning lizard. The specific epithet of the type species, lamarcki, references Jean-Baptiste Lamarck, an early evolutionary biologist who developed the theory of evolution by acquired characteristics.
