= Paul Carié =

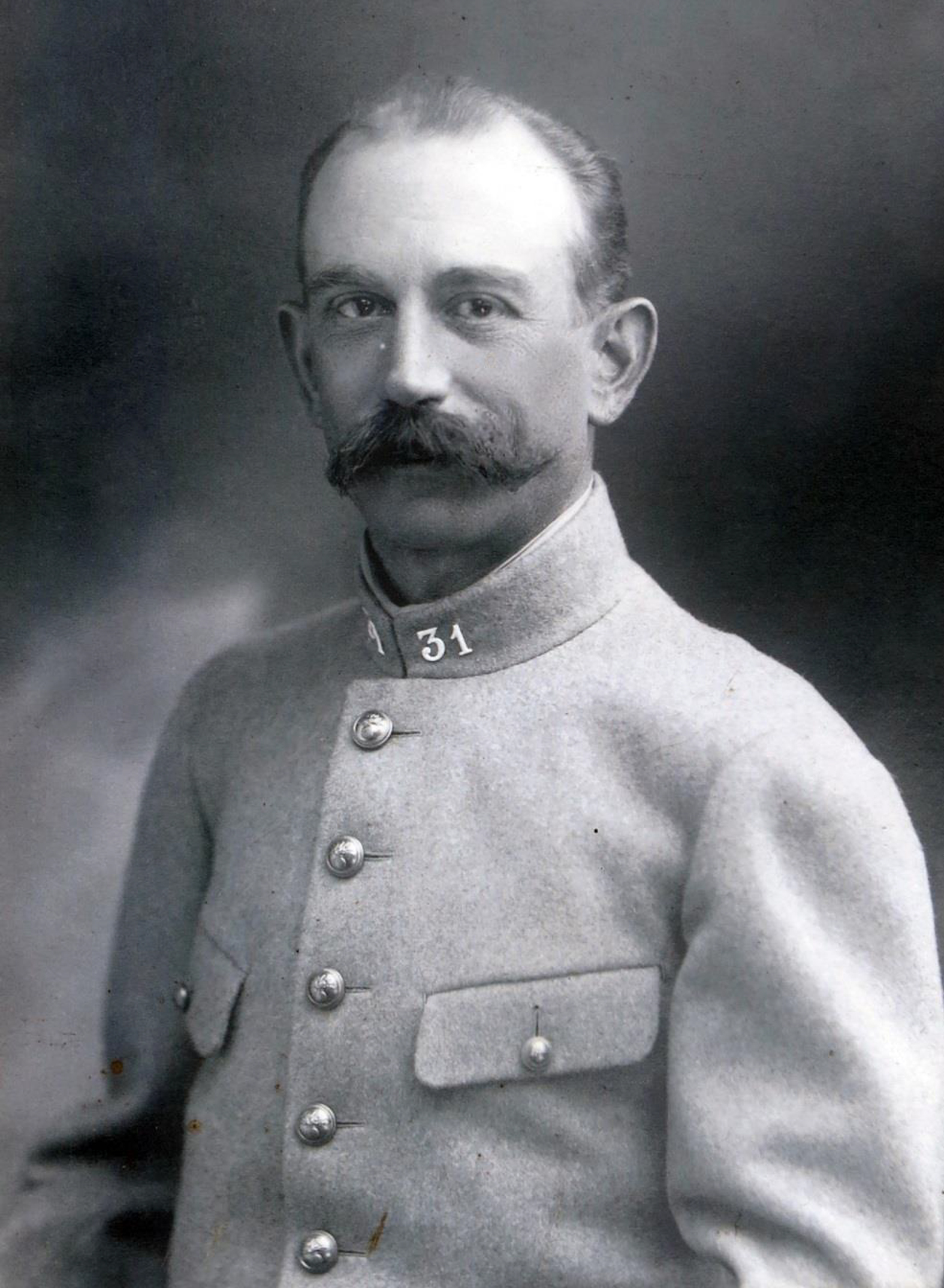
- Born: November 6, 1876; Beau Bassin-Rose Hill, Mauritius
- Died: December 19, 1930 (aged 54)

François Joseph Paul Carié (November 6, 1876 – December 19, 1930) was a French naturalist born in Mauritius. He is best known for his fossil collection and involvement in the Mauritian sugar industry.

== Biography ==
Carié was born on November 6, 1876, in Beau Bassin-Rose Hill, Mauritius to a French settler family. His uncle, Thom Thierry, was a well-known industrialist. Carié studied at the Royal College of Mauritius and worked as an accountant with Blyth Brothers (Now Ireland Blyth Ltd.) from 1899-1901. After the death of his mother in 1899 he inherited a sugar cane plantation - the Mon Désert sugar estate - and property in Paris.

Carié took an interest in the fauna of the Indian Ocean islands, particularly the Mascarene Islands. In 1865, he discovered fossil deposits at Mare-aux-Songes on his sugar estate. These fossils were primarily that of the dodo. He included these dodo bones in his natural history collections, which he would expand with the purchase of specimen collections of Louis Thirioux. In 1914, he began working as a corresponding member of the Muséum National d’Histoire Naturelle, in Paris, France. Also in 1914, he began working as a translator in London and Paris during World War I. In 1918, he sold his sugar business in Mauritius and moved to Paris.

Mauritius was a Dutch colony in the Indian Ocean until 1710 when it was placed under the control of France. The British gained ownership over the islands following the Treaty of Paris of 1814. Carié was a supporter of placing the territory under the control of French colonialists during the Treaty of Versailles (1919).

Paul Carié died at his home on the Avenue de Suffren in the 7th Arrondissement of Paris on December 19, 1930. He is buried in the Père Lachaise Cemetery in Paris, France.

== Kiki ==
In 1923, Carié donated a giant tortoise (Aldabrachelys gigantea) named Kiki to the Jardin des Plantes in Paris. Kiki was a famous attraction at the Jardin des Plantes and would live to the estimated age of 146 in 2009.
