= Taytalura =

Taytalura Temporal range: Late Triassic (late Carnian) 231.4 Ma
- Holotype skull

Scientific classification
- Kingdom: Animalia
- Phylum: Chordata
- Class: Reptilia
- Clade: Lepidosauromorpha
- Genus: †Taytalura; Martinez et al., 2021

Type species
- †Taytalura alcoberi Martinez et al., 2021

Extinct genus of reptile

Taytalura is an extinct genus of lepidosauromorph reptile from the Late Triassic (Carnian age) Ischigualasto Formation of Argentina. It contains a single species, Taytalura alcoberi, which is known from a well-preserved skull. As a lepidosauromorph, Taytalura is a distant relative of modern lepidosaurs such as rhynchocephalians (the tuatara and its extinct kin) and squamates (lizards and snakes). Taytalura did not belong to any group of modern lepidosaurs, since it bears unique features, such as unfused bones in the skull roof and teeth which all sit loosely in a deep groove without sockets. Regardless, micro-CT scanning reveals features of the skull previously only seen in rhynchocephalians (sphenodonts and their ancestors). This suggests that the ancestral condition of the skull in lepidosaurs was more similar to sphenodonts than to squamates.

== Discovery ==
Taytalura is known from a single skull, PVSJ 698, found at Ischigualasto Provincial Park in San Juan Province, Argentina. The skull was collected from geological strata of the Cancha de Bochas Member of the Ischigualasto Formation. Radiometric dating has provided an age of around 231.4 Ma for an ash bed at the base of the formation. This would place Taytalura in the late Carnian stage of the Late Triassic. Taytalura is one of only two lepidosauromorphs known from the Carnian of Gondwana, the other being Clevosaurus hadropodon, a sphenodont from Brazil. This would also qualify it as one of the oldest unambiguous Gondwanan members of the group.

The genus name Taytalurabis a combination of 'Tayta' (the Quechua word for 'father') and 'lura' (the Kakán word for 'lizard'), referencing its position as an early lepidosauromorph. The specific name alcoberi honors prolific Argentine paleontologist Oscar Alcober.

== Description ==
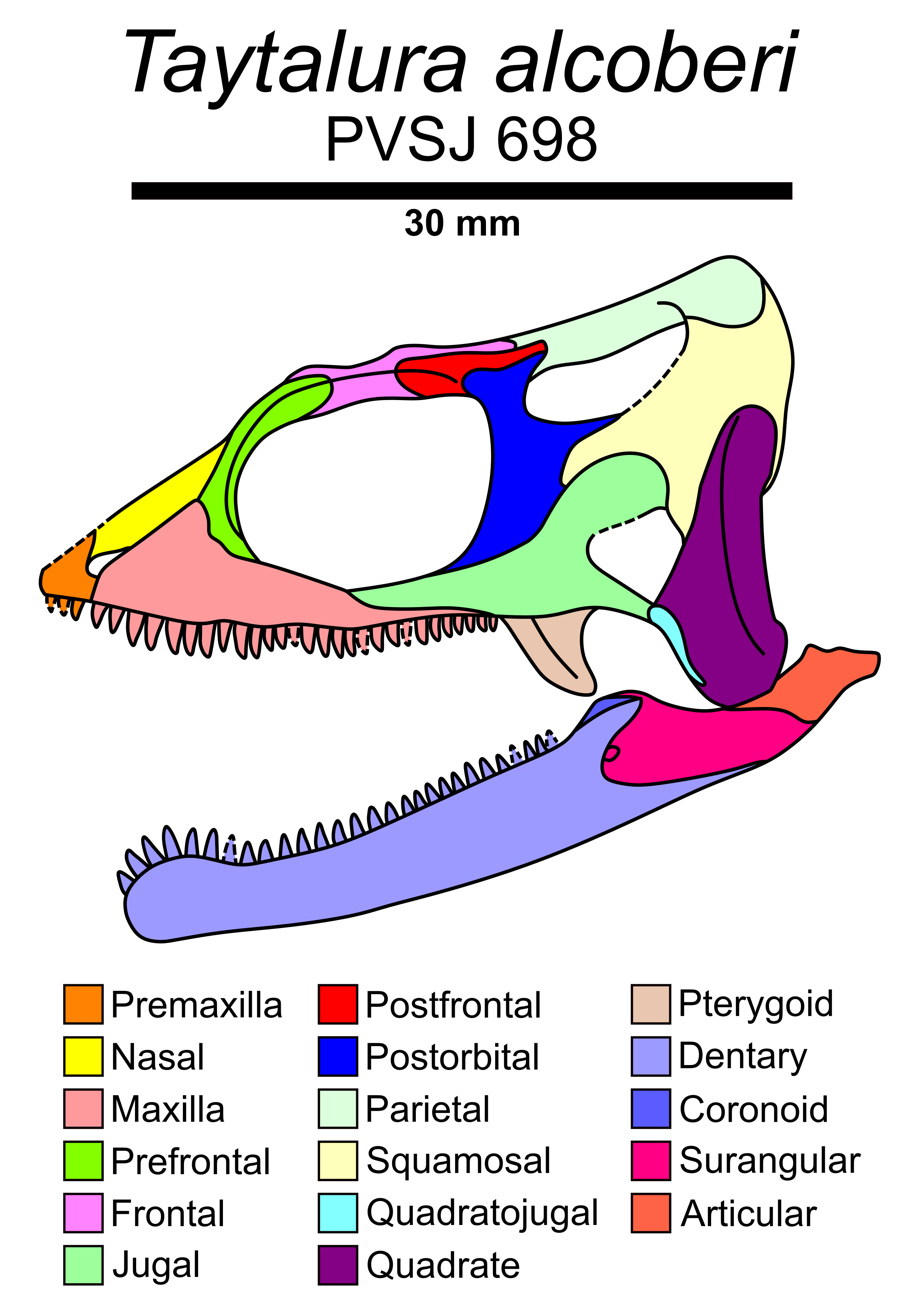
Reconstructed skull

The skull is about 3.2 centimetres (1.3 in) in length, with a short, pointed snout, large orbits (eye sockets), and broad upper and lower temporal fenestrae. Most skull bones are ornamented by tiny pits, especially in the upper part of the skull and around the orbit. The premaxilla is small and unspecialized, with three teeth. The maxilla reaches its greatest height in its front half, but it also sends back a very long and thin posterior process (rear prong) which extends beyond the rear edge of the orbit. No other early lepidosauromorph has a maxilla which extends so far back. This also allows the cranial tooth row to extend fully under the orbit. The teeth are thin and smoothly conical, and those at the front of the skull are slightly larger than those further back. At least 21 teeth were present in each maxilla, possibly up to 28 including missing spaces undergoing tooth replacement.

All the toothed bones of Taytalura have a unique form of tooth implantation. The teeth all sit in a narrow groove running along the edge of the skull. This contrasts with thecodont implantation, found in mammals and archosaurs, where the teeth occupy discrete sockets. Yet it also differs from lepidosaurian approaches to tooth attachment. Most lizards have pleurodont implantation, with the teeth adhered to the inside of the jaw, exposing their roots towards the tongue. Sphenodonts and some lizards acquire acrodont dentition, with the teeth fully fused to the rim of the jaw. Taytalura’s approach may be an intermediate stage between thecodonty and pleurodonty, removing the bony ridges between sockets but not yet the continuous bony plate which sheaths the internal edge of the tooth row.

As typical for lepidosauromorphs, the lacrimal is absent while the prefrontal is tall, sharply curved, and roughly textured. The nasals, frontals, and parietals each occur in pairs, in contrast to lepidosaurs, where at least some of the skull roof bones are fused at the midline. This suggests that fusion in the skull roof is a condition which was acquired convergently in the evolution of sphenodonts and squamates. When the skull is viewed from above, the postfrontals are T-shaped, with a sizeable posterior process. In contrast, many other early diapsids have roughly L-shaped postfrontals, where the posterior process is small or absent. Taytalura has a tetraradiate (four-branched) squamosal, similar in shape to that of sphenodonts but unlike any squamate. The jugal is three-pronged and has a distinctively elongated posteroventral process (rear lower prong). The posteroventral process may even be long enough to contact the sliver-shaped quadratojugal and enclose the lower edge of the lower temporal fenestra. Most sphenodonts have a fully enclosed lower temporal fenestra, but practically all squamates leave the hole open from below. The quadrate is large and marked by thin vertical crests defining a subtle tympanic conch (an excavation which accommodates the eardrum).

The palate (bony roof of the mouth) bears small teeth on the palatine and pterygoid bones. A slightly larger row of palatal teeth extends along the outer edge of the palatine, similar to Gephyrosaurus and sphenodonts. Also like sphenodonts, the ectopterygoid bones are narrow anteroposteriorly (from front-to-back) and oriented transversely, perpendicular to the main axis of the skull. The braincase is a difficult-to-interpret jumble of bone fragments. The stapes is thick along most of its extent, though much thinner towards its footplate (the outer tip which contacts the eardrum).

The lower jaws are slender and narrow, curving towards each other at the symphysis (chin). A curved symphysis is found in Vellbergia and most rhynchocephalians, but is rare in squamates. The dentary has a straight lower edge and up to 28 teeth, with the same unique tooth implantation style as the maxilla. The inner surface of the dentary is covered by a large splenial, a bone present in many squamates but absent in all known rhynchocephalians. A low coronoid crops up behind the tooth row, much smaller than in squamates. The back of the jaw is composed of the surangular (which is mostly exposed externally), the angular and prearticular (which are exposed internally), and the articular, which floors the jaw joint. The outer edge of the surangular is raised as a crest accommodating the jaw adductor muscle, unlike most lepidosauromorphs. The articular sends back a short retroarticular process (a rearward projection behind the jaw joint).

== Classification ==
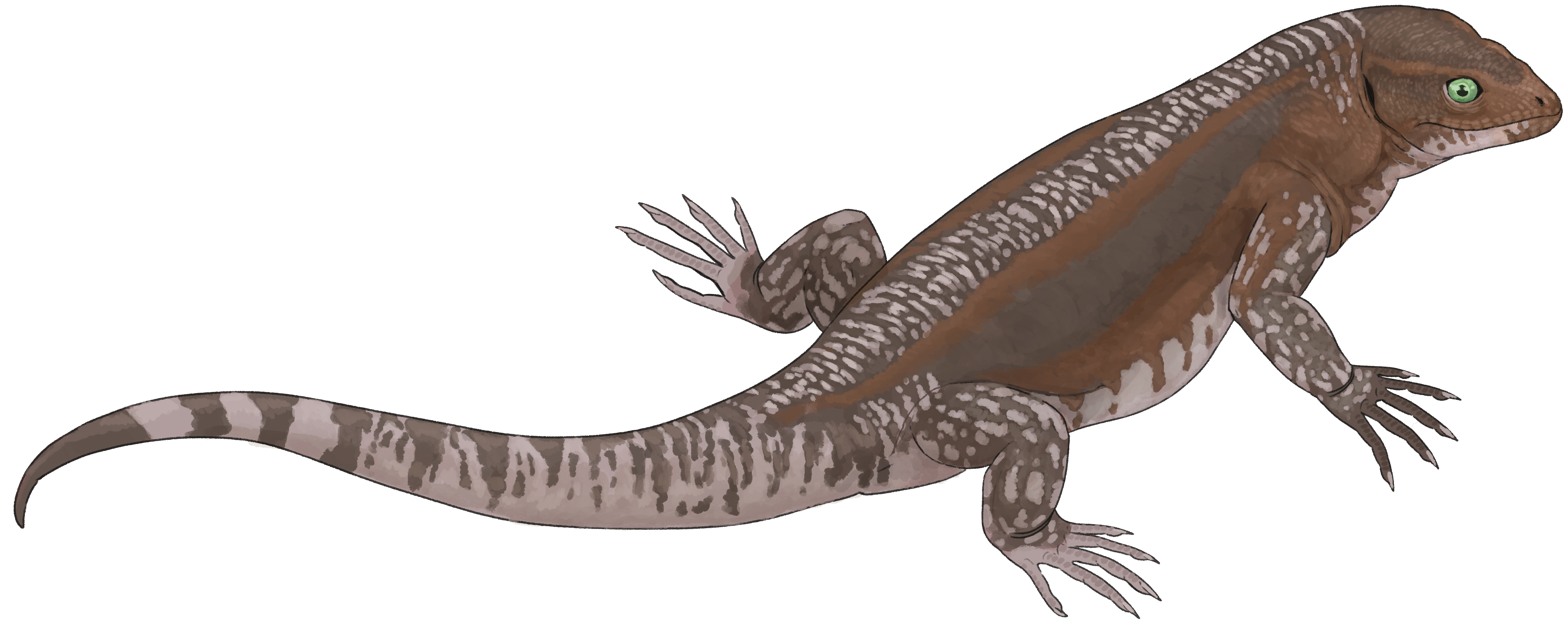
Life restoration

A morphospace analysis (which measures proportional similarity) clumps Taytalura with other early lepidosauromorphs among rhynchocephalians and other non-squamate diapsids. Squamates are strongly separated from their cohorts. When the morphospace is reconfigured to distinguish rhynchocephalians from non-rhynchocephalians, Taytalura overlaps with squamates and other diapsids. This supports prevalent views of the diversity of shapes within diapsids: squamates are easiest to distinguish, followed by rhynchocephalians, while basal lepidosauromorphs occupy a narrow range which is unexceptional among early diapsids.

The 2021 description of Taytalura featured a set of phylogenetic analyses with 145 taxa and 349 morphological characters, run through maximum parsimony or Bayesian inference standards. Some analyses were calibrated with molecular data from 47 living taxa. Taytalura is consistently found to be a basal lepidosauromorph occupying its own branch on the family tree, distinct from both stem group lineages for sphenodonts and squamates. Some Bayesian approaches conclusively place it outside the lepidosaur crown group, but most analyses cannot resolve further than a three-branch polytomy. One analysis, a Bayesian run combining both morphological and molecular data, classifies Palaeagama as the only lepidosauromorph more basal than Taytalura.

A 2022 study described new material of the stem-squamate Bellairsia and briefly classified Taytalura as a non-lepidosauromorph, closer to turtles. They noted that drawing conclusions on Taytalura's affinities is complicated by incomplete preservation and a lack of unambiguous lepidosauromorph features.
