= Stauromatodon =

Stauromatodon Temporal range: Middle Triassic, Ladinian

Scientific classification
- Kingdom: Animalia
- Phylum: Chordata
- Class: Reptilia
- Clade: Diapsida
- Genus: †Stauromatodon; Sobral, Sues & Schoch, 2021

Type species
- †Stauromatodon mohli Sobral, Sues & Schoch, 2021

Extinct genus of diapsid reptile

Stauromatodon is an extinct genus of diapsid reptile, possibly related to Saurosphargidae, from the Middle Triassic Erfurt Formation of Germany. It contains a single species, Stauromatodon mohli.
