= Sphenocondor =

Sphenocondor Temporal range: Middle Toarcian ~179.17–178.07 Ma

Scientific classification
- Kingdom: Animalia
- Phylum: Chordata
- Class: Reptilia
- Order: Rhynchocephalia
- Suborder: Sphenodontia
- Genus: †Sphenocondor; Apesteguía et al. 2012

Type species
- †Sphenocondor gracilis Apesteguía et al. 2012

Extinct genus of reptiles

Sphenocondor is an extinct genus of sphenodontian reptile from the Early Jurassic Cañadón Asfalto Formation of Argentina. It is known from a nearly complete lower jaw.

== Phylogeny ==
A phylogenetic analysis performed by Apestiguia et al. (2012) resulted in the following tree which shows the relationship of Sphenocondor to other rhynchocephalians:

- - Youngina
  - Pristidactylus
  - Gephyrosaurus
  - Sphenodontia
    - Diphydontosaurus
    - - Planocephalosaurus
      - - Rebbanasaurus
        - - - Sphenocondor
            - Godavarisaurus
          - - - Clevosaurus
              - Brachyrhinodon
            - - Palaeopleurosaurus
              - - - Sapheosaurus
                  - Kallimodon
                - - - Theretairus
                    - Sphenovipera
                  - - Homoeosaurus
                    - Zapatadon
                    - Cynosphenodon
                    - Sphenodon
                    - Ankylosphenodon
                    - Opisthodontia
                      - Kawasphenodon
                      - Opisthias
                      - - - Kaikaifilusaurus
                          - Eilenodon
                          - Toxolophosaurus
