= Coloradosphenodon =

Coloradosphenodon Temporal range: Late Triassic, Norian

Scientific classification
- Kingdom: Animalia
- Phylum: Chordata
- Class: Reptilia
- Order: Rhynchocephalia
- Suborder: Sphenodontia
- Clade: Acrosphenodontia
- Genus: †Coloradosphenodon; Gaetano et al., 2026
- Species: †C. lahni

Binomial name
- †Coloradosphenodon lahni Gaetano et al., 2026

Extinct reptile genus

Coloradosphenodon (lit. 'red Sphenodon') is an extinct genus of early rhynchocephalian reptile in the clade Sphenodontia (of which the tuatara is the only living member), known from the Late Triassic (Norian age) Los Colorados Formation of Argentina. The genus contains a single species, Coloradosphenodon lahni, known from a partial skull. Coloradosphenodon is the first rhynchocephalian to be found in the broader rock unit that includes the Los Colorados Formation. Furthermore, it is the most basal member of this group known from Gondwana, as its closest relatives are from Europe.

== Discovery and naming ==
The Coloradosphenodon fossil material was discovered in outcrops of the Los Colorados Formation (La Esquina locality) within Talampaya National Park in La Rioja Province, Argentina. The specimen is housed in the Museum of Natural Sciences (National University of La Rioja), where it is permanently accessioned as specimen PULR-V264. It consists of part of a skull, including much of the palate, snout, and mandible.

In 2026, Leandro C. Gaetano and colleagues described Coloradosphenodon lahni as a new genus and species of sphenodontian based on these fossil remains, designating PULR-V264 as the holotype specimen. The generic name, Coloradosphenodon, combines the Spanish word colroado, meaning 'red' (referencing the red-colored rock layers of the Los Colorados Formation), with 'Sphenodon' (lit. 'wedge tooth'), the only extant rhynchocephalian and a common suffix in sphenodontian genus names. The specific name, lahni, is dedicated to the Laboratorio Argentino de Haces de Neutrones (LAHN) and its support for paleontological research and the study of vertebrate fossils from the type locality.

The discovery of Coloradosphenodon was biologically and geographically notable for several reasons; is the first rhynchocephalian to be named from the Ischigualasto-Villa Unión Basin, the larger collection of rock layers including the Los Colorados Formation and other paleontologically significant Triassic units, such as the Chañares and Ischigualasto formations. Within the Los Colorados Formation, it is the first named representative of the locality's small animal fauna that is not a cynodontian (mammal-line synapsid). Several other rhynchocephalians are known from Gondwana, but they all belong to the more derived clade Eusphenodontia, making Coloradosphenodon both the basalmost Gondwanan rhynchocephalian and the only named non-eusphenodontian from this region. All other non-eusphenodontian rhynchocephalians named at the time of the description of Coloradosphenodon are known from Europe.

== Classification ==
To test the affinities and relationships of Coloradosphenodon, Gaetano et al. (2026) included it in an updated version of the phylogenetic matrix of Chambi-Trowell et al. (2021). They recovered it as a member of the Sphenodontian subclade Acrosphenodontia, as the sister taxon to Parvosaurus, which is known from rocks of a similar age in Germany. All other more basal rhynchocephalians in their results are also known from Europe. These results are displayed in the cladogram below:

- Rhynchocephalia
  - †Gephyrosaurus bridensis
  - - †Penegephyrosaurus curtiscoppi
    - Sphenodontia
      - - †Diphydontosaurus avonis
        - †Wirtembergia hauboldae
      - Acrosphenodontia
        - †Planocephalosaurus robinsonae
        - - - †Coloradosphenodon lahni
            - †Parvosaurus harudensis
          - Eusphenodontia
            - †Polysphenodon mulleri
            - - †Microsphenodon bonapartei
              - - †Clevosauridae
                - Neosphenodontia
                  - - †Leptosaurus neptunius
                    - - - †Theretairus antiquus
                        - †Zapatadon ejidoensis
                      - - †Lanceirosphenodon ferigoloi
                        - - †Sphenocondor gracilis
                          - - †Pamizinsaurus tlayuaensis
                            - †Rebbanasaurus jaini
                  - Sphenodontidae
                    - †Opisthodontia
                    - Sphenodontinae
