= Paleollanosaurus =

Paleollanosaurus Temporal range: Norian–Rhaetian

Scientific classification
- Domain: Eukaryota
- Kingdom: Animalia
- Phylum: Chordata
- Class: Reptilia
- Order: Rhynchocephalia
- Genus: †Paleollanosaurus; Heckert, 2004
- Species: †P. fraseri

Binomial name
- †Paleollanosaurus fraseri Heckert, 2004

Extinct genus of reptile

Paleollanosaurus is an extinct genus of sphenodontian reptile that lived during the Late Triassic. The type species P. fraseri was described from a jaw fragment found in West Texas in North America. Remains have also been reported from Switzerland. It is generally considered a basal sphenodontian. Cladogram following Chambi-Trowell et al., 2021.

- Rhynchocephalia
  - Gephyrosaurus
  - - Penegephyrosaurus
    - Sphenodontia
      - Paleollanosaurus
      - Vellberg rhynchocephalian
      - Diphydontosaurus
      - Acrosphenodontia
        - Planocephalosaurus
        - - Godavarisaurus
          - - Polysphenodon
            - - Microsphenodon
              - Eusphenodontia
