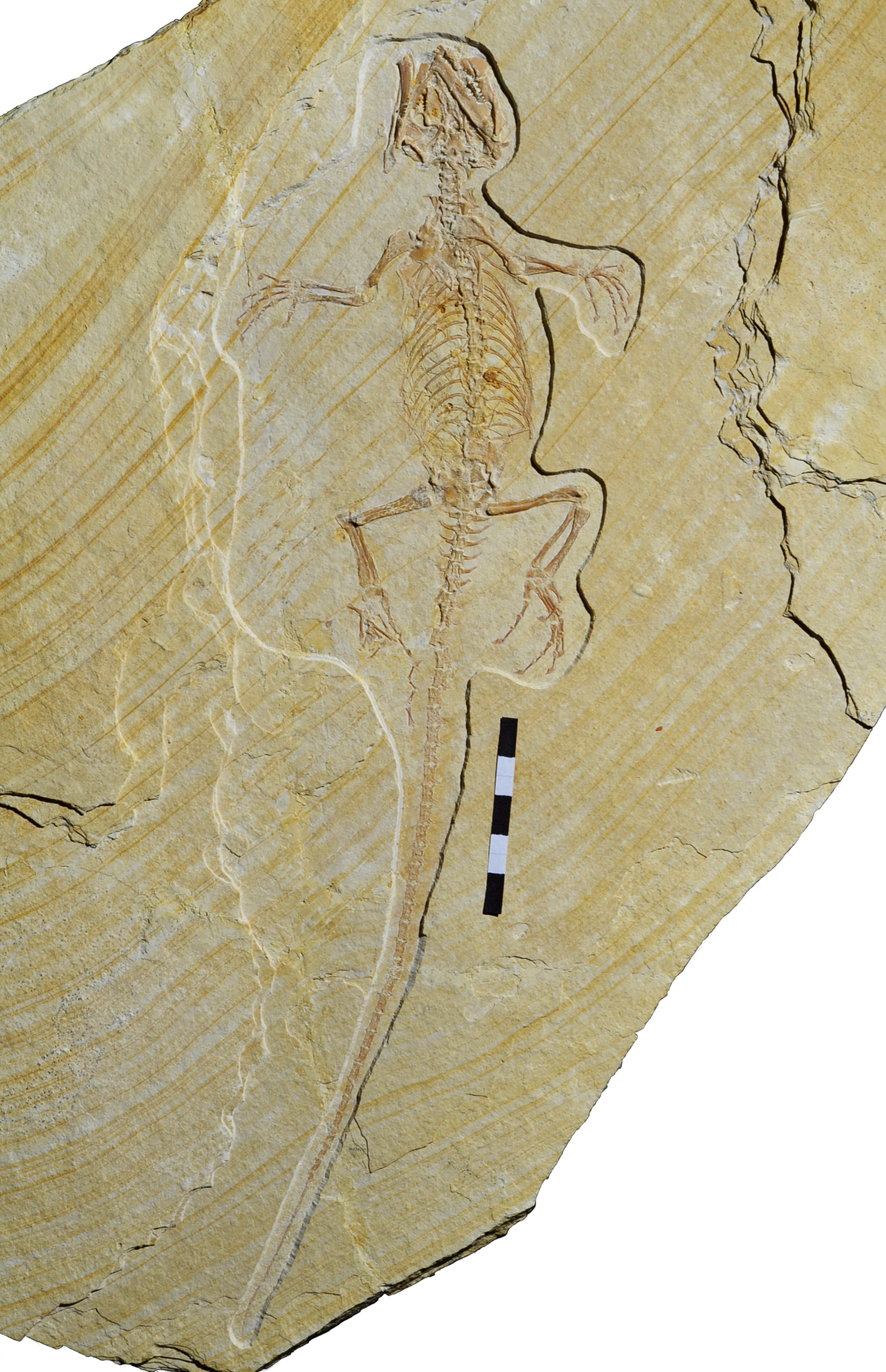

Scientific classification
- Kingdom: Animalia
- Phylum: Chordata
- Class: Reptilia
- Order: Rhynchocephalia
- Family: Sphenodontidae
- Subfamily: Sphenodontinae
- Genus: †Sphenofontis; Villa et al. 2021

Type species
- †Sphenofontis velserae Villa et al. 2021

= Sphenofontis =

Sphenofontis Temporal range: Kimmeridgian

Extinct genus of reptiles

Sphenofontis is an extinct genus of sphenodontian reptile known from the Late Jurassic of Germany, with a single known species, S. velserae. It is known from a single nearly complete and articulated sub-adult specimen (SNSB-BSPG 1993 XVIII 4), found in the late Kimmeridgian aged Torleite Formation in Brunn quarry in Bavaria, Southern Germany. It is thought to be a close relative of the living tuatara (Sphenodon puncatus), tentatively referred to Sphenodontinae.

== Etymology ==
The genus name combines the prefix "Spheno-", with reference to the taxon being a sphenodontian, and the latin word "fontis"( spring, but also can mean "well"), roughly meaning "the sphenodontian of the well". This acknowledges the origin of the name of the type locality Brunn, which comes from the German Brunnen (= well). The species name honours Lisa Velser, who discovered and prepared the holotype specimen.

== Description ==
The holotype of Sphenofontis comprises a nearly complete and articulated skeleton of a subadult individual. Sphenofontis velserae can be diagnosed by at least three possible autapomorphies: a medially-displaced fourth additional tooth in the maxilla; proximally-constricted and strongly distally-expanded transverse processes of the first sacral vertebra; and anterolaterally-oriented transverse processes of the first caudal vertebra.

== Paleobiology ==
Sphenofontis does not display any evident specialization in its dentition, which was therefore most likely adapted to a generalist carnivorous/insectivorous diet comparable with that of the extant Sphenodon. The overall cranial and postcranial morphology lacks any clear adaptation towards an aquatic or semiaquatic mode of life, thus indicating that Sphenofontis lived in the terrestrial ecosystems of the islands. Based on limb and body proportions, Sphenofontis agrees more with ground-dwelling than arboreal habits in having rather short limbs when compared with the presacral length. Furthermore, it shows no indication of running abilities in the relative length of the limb elements. Thus, a less-specialized ground-dwelling behavior may be suggested for this new taxon. Its precise mode of life needs further morphofunctional studies to be better understood.

== Paleoecology ==
Sphenofontis lived in the Torleite Formation, which represents a sequence of Kimmeridgian deposits of an ancient archipelago. In this environment, the crocodylomorphs Alligatorium, Dakosaurus and Cricosaurus, the small theropod Sciurumimus, the turtle Eurysternum and a lot of fishes lived with Sphenofontis. It was likely a generalist carnivore/insectivore.

== Taxonomy ==
Sphenofontis is placed in the clade Sphenodontinae as one of the closest known relatives of the tuatara. Cladogram after Simoes et al. 2022

- Sphenodontia
  - †Diphydontosaurus
  - Eusphenodontia
    - †Planocephalosaurus
    - †Clevosaurus
    - Neosphenodontia
      - - - †Homoeosaurus
          - †Pleurosauridae
          - - †Leptosaurus +†Kallimodon
            - †Sapheosauridae
        - Sphenodontidae
          - †Eilenodontinae
          - Sphenodontinae
            - †Navajosphenodon
            - †Cynosphenodon
            - - †Sphenofontis
              - - †Kawasphenodon
                - Sphenodon (tuatara)
