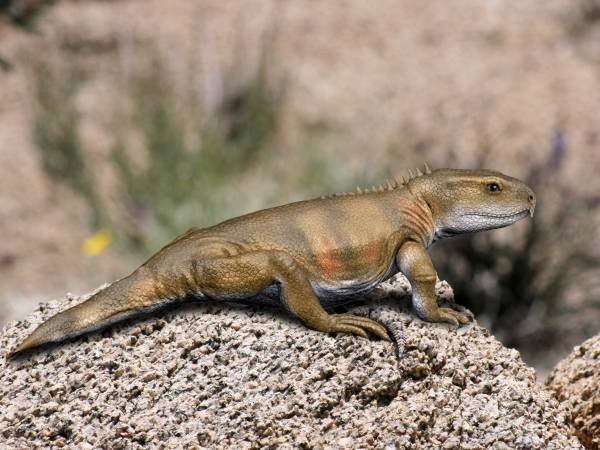
- Priosphenodon, a large eilenodontine opisthodont

Scientific classification
- Kingdom: Animalia
- Phylum: Chordata
- Class: Reptilia
- Order: Rhynchocephalia
- Suborder: Sphenodontia
- Infraorder: Eusphenodontia
- Clade: Neosphenodontia
- Clade: †Opisthodontia; Apesteguia & Novas, 2003

Genera
- Fraserosphenodon; Kawasphenodon?; Opisthias; Alamitosphenos; Trullidens; Eilenodontinae; Eilenodon; Kaikaifilusaurus; Patagosphenos; Priosphenodon; Sphenotitan?; Toxolophosaurus

= Opisthodontia (reptile) =

Opisthodonts Temporal range: Late Triassic–Late Cretaceous

Clade of reptiles

Opisthodontia is a proposed clade of sphenodontian reptiles, uniting Opisthias from the Late Jurassic-earliest Cretaceous of Europe and North America with the Eilenodontinae, a group of herbivorous sphenodontians known from the Late Triassic to Late Cretaceous.

== Description ==
=== Teeth and diet ===
Like other sphenodonts, opisthodonts had acrodont teeth which grew directly from the bone. They had one row of teeth on the lower jaw and two rows on the roof of the mouth. When processing food, their mandibular teeth would have slid between the outer (maxillary) teeth and inner (palatine) teeth. Some opisthodonts, such as Sphenotitan, also had clusters of small teeth on the pterygoid at the center of the mouth roof. Opisthodont teeth were wide, numerous, and tightly-packed for grinding and shredding tough plant matter. Although wide shredding teeth are also known in a few other sphenodontians, such as Clevosaurus and Pelecymala, the most diverse and long-lasting group of herbivorous rhynchocephalians were the opisthodonts. Some more generalized opisthodonts, such as Opisthias, were probably more capable of omnivory than the advanced eilenodonts.

The mandibular teeth of opisthodonts were characteristically edged with forward-pointing flanges. Although Sphenotitan only had flanges on the medial (inside) edge, other eilenodonts had flanges on the lateral (outside) edge as well, making their teeth anteriorly concave and overlapping. The maxillary teeth, on the other hand, had long flanges aligned in a posteromedial-anterolateral direction.

Opisthodonts lacked dental regionalization, meaning that all of their teeth had the same form and they did not have caniform or hatchling teeth like other sphenodonts. Despite having had thicker enamel to resist wearing down their teeth, opisthodonts have often been found with their teeth significantly worn away, especially towards the front of the jaw. The tip of the lower jaw is completely toothless in opisthodonts. Their jaws were also deep (particularly in eilenodonts) to counter stresses which would have occurred during food processing.

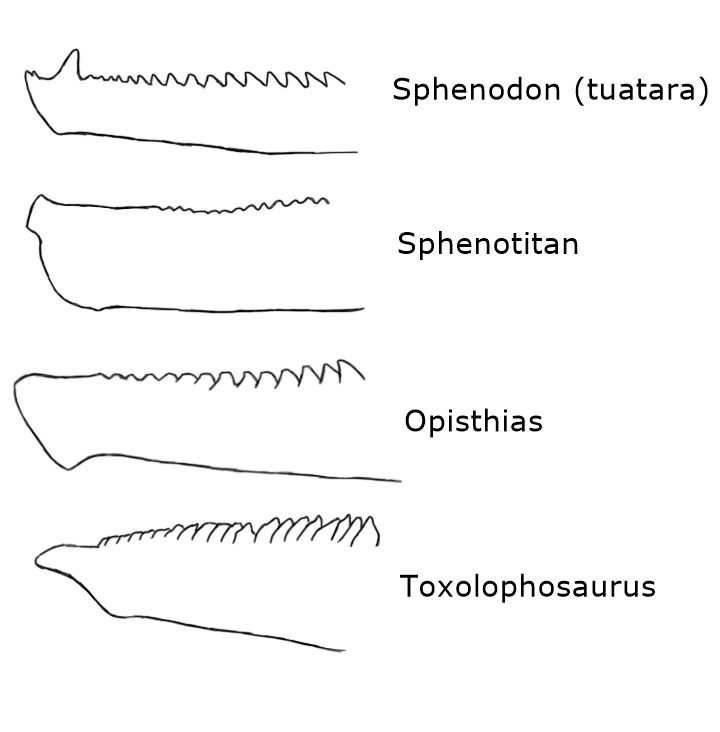
Lower jaws of Sphenodon and several opisthodonts.

=== Characteristic features ===
Opisthodonts can be characterized by the following synapomorphies:

- A rounded and well-developed mandibular symphysis.
- A well-developed, anteroposteriorly projecting mandibular spur.
- No dental regionalization in adults or juveniles.
- Extensive posteromedial/anterolateral flanges on the posterior maxillary teeth.
- Anteromedial flanges on the mandibular teeth.
- A short or absent premaxillary process of the maxilla.
- The posterodorsal process of the premaxilla being present.

In addition, most opisthodonts also had dental ridges (or crests) on their mandibular teeth. The most advanced opisthodonts belong to the subfamily (or tribe) Eilenodontinae (or Eilenodontini). Most eilenodonts were large, stockily built members of the clade, with massive jaws, low and overlapping teeth, and a large hooked "beak"(a rhynchocephalian feature). Their skulls were reminiscent of rodent skulls, leading some to presume that they were gregarious burrowers which fed on tough vegetation. The largest known terrestrial rhynchocephalian was an eilenodont, Priosphenodon avelasi.

== Classification ==
First defined as a family by Apesteguia and Novas in 2003, Opisthodontia has generally been considered a well-supported clade, especially compared to other groups within Rhynchocephalia, which often shift in evolutionary position between studies. In particular, they are generally considered to be fairly close relatives of the family Sphenodontidae, which includes Sphenodon. Both opisthodonts and sphenodontids share the ability to move their jaw in a forward-to-back chewing motion, earning them the informal name "eupropalinal sphenodonts" as a result. Other possibly herbivorous rhynchocephalians, such as Pelecymala and Ankylosphenodon, have sometimes been suggested to be very close relatives (or basal members) of Opisthodontia in some studies, although these hypotheses are not well supported. Ankylosphenodon is considered to be placed within Sphenodontidae, while Pelecymala is inconsistent in placement but may be a quite basal rhynchocephalian. "Clevosaurus" latidens, which had previously been referred to Pelecymala and later Clevosaurus, was suggested to be an opisthodont in 2013, a hypothesis which was confirmed through a 2015 phylogenetic analysis. This same analysis found that Opisthias and Kawasphenodon formed a clade at the base of Opisthodontia, with Sphenotitan being a basal eilenodont. In 2018, "Clevosaurus" latidens was named as the new genus Fraserosphenodon, and placed as the most basal opisthodont.

== Distribution ==
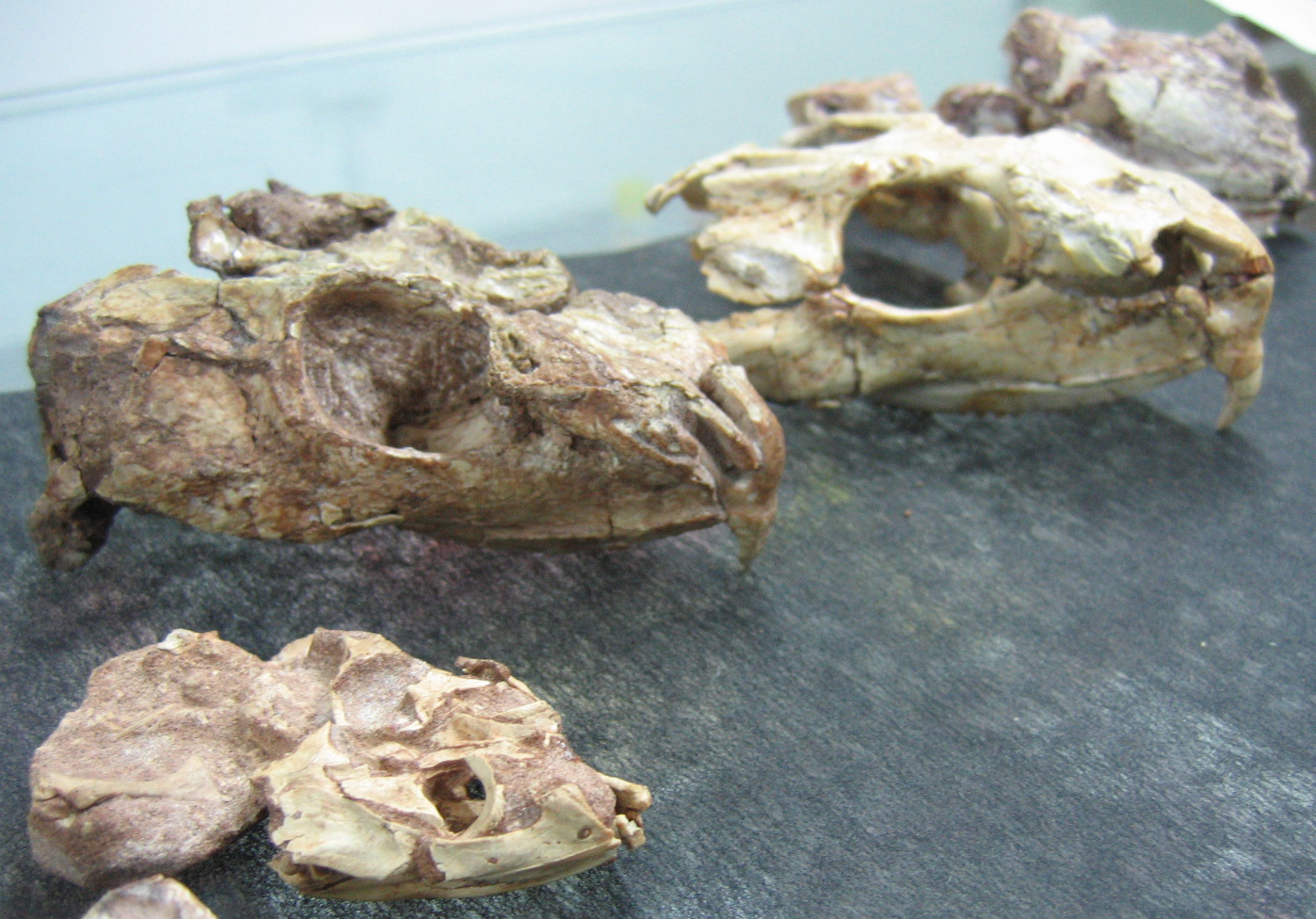
Skulls of Priosphenodon individuals of various ages

Opisthodonts were numerous at times, with Opisthias having a practically worldwide distribution in the Jurassic and Priosphenodon being known from multiple specimens from the early Cretaceous of Argentina.

The oldest opisthodonts include Sphenotitan and Fraserosphenodon, from the Norian and Rhaetian (late Triassic) of Argentina and England, respectively. Fraserosphenodon is considered to be the most basal opisthodont. Although Sphenotitan was also once believed to be the most basal opisthodont, it also shows many similarities with eilenodonts, and may have been the most basal member of that subfamily. The oldest known non-Sphenotitan eilenodonts lived during the Jurassic and probably became extinct near the end of the Cretaceous. Opisthodonts as a whole survived a major extinction of Laurasian rhynchocephalians in the early Cretaceous as well as the K/T extinction at the end of the Cretaceous which led to the downfall of non-avian dinosaurs. The last known species of opisthodont was Kawasphenodon peligrensis, a small patagonian member of the group which lived during the Paleocene. The last of the opisthodonts probably became extinct due to the cooling climate of the late Eocene.
