= Opisthiamimus =

Opisthiamimus Temporal range: Tithonian
- Restored skull in lateral view

Scientific classification
- Domain: Eukaryota
- Kingdom: Animalia
- Phylum: Chordata
- Class: Reptilia
- Order: Rhynchocephalia
- Infraorder: Eusphenodontia
- Genus: †Opisthiamimus; DeMar, Jones & Carrano, 2022

Type species
- †Opisthiamimus gregori DeMar, Jones & Carrano, 2022

Extinct genus of reptiles

Opisthiamimus (lit. 'Opisthias mimic') is an extinct genus of small-bodied eusphenodontian rhynchocephalian from the Upper Jurassic Morrison Formation of Northern Wyoming, United States. The type species, O. gregori, is known from four specimens, which together preserve a nearly complete skeleton. It is amongst the smallest known rhynchocephalians, with a skull length of 2.05 centimetres (0.81 in) and a snout–vent length (the length from the tip of the snout to the cloaca) of around 8.5 centimetres (3.3 in). The genus was described in 2022 by David DeMar, Marc E. H. Jones, and Matthew Carrano. It was found that it was only distantly related to Eilenodon, Theretairus and Opisthias, the other known rhynchocephalians from the Morrison Formation.

== Phylogeny ==
Cladogram following Sues and Schoch, 2023:

- - Rhynchocephalia
    - Wirtembergia hauboldae
    - - Gephyrosaurus bridensis
      - Sphenodontia
        - Diphydontosaurus avonis
        - Acrosphenodontia
          - Planocephalosaurus robinsonae
          - - Rebbanasaurus jaini
            - - - Godavarisaurus lateefi
                - Theretairus antiquus
              - Eusphenodontia
                - Polysphenodon mulleri
                - - Opisthiamimus gregori
                  - - Clevosauridae
                      - - Clevosaurus convallis
                        - - Clevosaurus brasiliensis
                          - Clevosaurus hadroprodon
                      - - Clevosaurus bairdi
                        - - Clevosaurus hudsoni
                          - Clevosaurus cambrica
                    - Neosphenodontia
