= Whitakersaurus =

Whitakersaurus Temporal range: Late Triassic

Scientific classification
- Kingdom: Animalia
- Phylum: Chordata
- Class: Reptilia
- Order: Rhynchocephalia
- Suborder: Sphenodontia
- Genus: †Whitakersaurus; Heckert et al., 2008
- Species: †W. bermani

Binomial name
- †Whitakersaurus bermani Heckert et al., 2008

Extinct genus of reptiles

Whitakersaurus is a genus of sphenodontian rhynchocephalian reptile dated to be late Triassic in age and is from the Ghost Ranch fossil quarry in New Mexico, USA. It is named after the discoverer of the Ghost Ranch quarry, George O. Whitaker. The fossil was described in 2007.

== Features ==
The left and right dentary are preserved, along with a fragmentary left maxilla and probable palatal bone, on two blocks of stone.

=== Dentary bones ===
The left dentary is fragmented but still has almost all teeth present, whereas the right dentary is incomplete and has most of the teeth. The left dentary is 11 mm long and has multiple broken teeth or tooth positions. The coronoid process is missing, but there may be a suture present where the dentary was joined to the surangular. A small groove is present on the lingual side of teeth 16-18. The right dentary is only partial, unlike the left dentary where all the fragments are present, but the piece preserved is 9 mm long. The posterior teeth are displaced ventrally, but at least 16 teeth are present, probably 18. The right dentary also shows the presence of at least five nutrient foramina ventral to the teeth.

=== Maxilla ===
This is less than 2 mm long, but contains four relatively large teeth, probably posterior.

=== Palatal bone ===
This is a very thin element, resembling an extremely thin plate of bone. There are six teeth here, arranged in a single line. It is probably either the palatine or pterygoid bone, and closely resembles the pterygoid of Clevosaurus. The whole element is approximately 2 mm long.

=== Dentition ===
Like its relatives Planocephalosaurus and Diphydontosaurus, Whitakersaurus possesses a mix of dental implantations. It is posteriorly acrodont, after the ninth tooth, and anteriorly pleurodont. There are 19 teeth on each side of the lower jaw, which are heterodont. The first 14 teeth are small and peg-like, and the last 5 teeth are much larger and laterally compressed. The teeth gradually increase in size posteriorly, with teeth 11-14 being twice as large as teeth 1-4, and teeth 17&19 being twice as large as teeth 11-14. However, teeth 16 and 18 are very small compared to teeth 17 and 19, which does correspond with the tooth development of other sphenodonts. The large posterior teeth are slightly conical and striated.

The maxillary teeth are acrodont, large, and striated. They are taller than long, laterally compressed, and are almost all broken. The complete one is slightly curved towards the others, whereas two of the incomplete teeth here are so close that their bases touch.

The palatal teeth have tiny crowns, are in a single row, and are arranged regularly. They are a little taller than the plate of bone is thick.

== Significance ==
The very small size of the Whitakersaurus fossil suggests that it may have been a juvenile, although the characteristic 'hatchling dentition' that would normally be found here is only present for the last two teeth. It is also not that much smaller than many other sphenodontians. It has fewer dentary teeth than many of its relatives, and fewer of them are pleurodont.

Whitakersaurus is significant because, as well as being the most complete rhynchocephalian from the Chinle Group, it has many primitive features indicating it is a relatively basal sphenodont, but also a few more derived features. This indicates that primitive and derived lineages of rhynchocephalian radiated across the world before Whitakersaurus evolved, possibly showing an early radiative event.
