= Toxolophosaurus =

Toxolophosaurus Temporal range: Early Cretaceous

Scientific classification
- Kingdom: Animalia
- Phylum: Chordata
- Class: Reptilia
- Order: Rhynchocephalia
- Subfamily: †Eilenodontinae
- Genus: †Toxolophosaurus; Olson, 1960

Species
- †Toxolophosaurus cloudi (type) Olson, 1960

Extinct genus of reptiles

Toxolophosaurus was a sphenodont which lived in North America during the Early Cretaceous.

The first specimen, consisting of a pair of lower jaws, was found by George Cloud and described by Everett C. Olson in 1960 in the Kootenai Formation of Montana, 223.75 feet above the base of the Kootenai. Olson originally classified Toxolophosaurus as a member of the family Trilophosauridae, which was a group of primitive lizard-like reptiles which lived during the Triassic Period, although he provided no reasons for this decision. In 1981, Toxolophosaurus was reassigned to the family Sphenodontidae, on the basis that the specimens were more similar to Sphenodon than to members of Trilophosauridae. This classification was confirmed in 1985 by Michael Benton. It is closely related to Priosphenodon and Eilenodon.

In addition to the specimen recovered from Montana, numerous sphenodont fossils which have been ascribed to Toxolophosaurus have also been found within the Yellow Cat Member of the Cedar Mountain Formation.

Toxolophosaurus was herbivorous.

== See also ==
- Lepidosauromorpha
- Lepidosauria
- Sphenodontia / Rhynchocephalia
- Opisthodontia
- Opisthias
