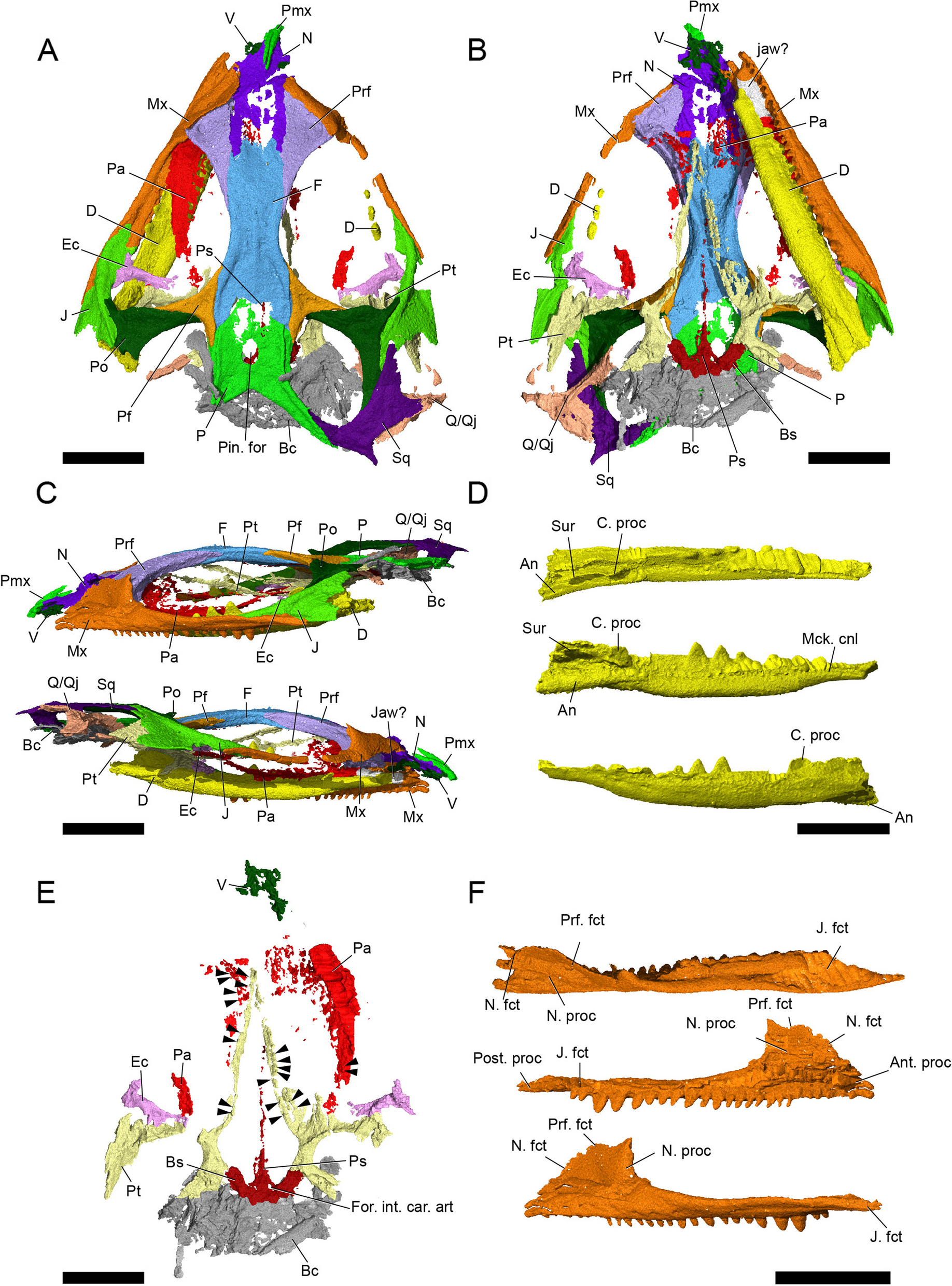

Scientific classification
- Kingdom: Animalia
- Phylum: Chordata
- Class: Reptilia
- Order: Rhynchocephalia
- Genus: †Parvosaurus; Freisem et al., 2024
- Species: †P. harudensis

Binomial name
- †Parvosaurus harudensis Freisem et al., 2024

= Parvosaurus =

Parvosaurus Temporal range: Late Triassic Norian

Extinct species of reptile

Parvosaurus is an extinct species of rhynchocephalian reptile known from the Late Triassic of Germany.

== Discovery ==
The specimen was discovered in the rock surrounding a specimen of Plateosaurus that had been collected from a brick pit located in Saxony-Anhalt between Halberstadt and Quedlinburg on the Bundesstraße 79 highway in sediments belonging to the Late Triassic (Norian) Arnstadt Formation by Werner Janensch in 1928. The specimen was not discovered until the block was CT scanned as part of the redescription of the small reptile Elachistosuchus in 2015.

== Description ==
The species is only known from a skull and partial lower jaws. The skull has been compressed during fossilization. The specimen is thought to be a juvenile, as it has relatively large eyes and is small in size, with the skull only being around 1.6 centimetres (0.63 in) in length, comparable to that of Diphydontosaurus. The dentition is very similar to that of Diphydontosaurus.

== Taxonomy ==
Parvosaurus was placed as a basal sphenodontian by its describers, more derived than Diphydontosaurus but less derived than Planocephalosaurus:

- Rhynchocephalia
  - Gephyrosaurus
  - Sphenodontia
    - Diphydontosaurus
    - - Parvosaurus
      - - Planocephalosaurus
        - - Clevosaurus
          - Neosphenodontia
