= Gephyrosauridae =

Gephyrosauridae Temporal range: Late Triassic - Early Jurassic, 201.5–195 Ma
- Reconstruction of the skull of Gephyrosaurus

Scientific classification
- Kingdom: Animalia
- Phylum: Chordata
- Order: Rhynchocephalia
- Family: †Gephyrosauridae; Evans, 1980

Type species
- †Gephyrosaurus bridensis Evans, 1980

Genera
- †Deltadectes Whiteside, Duffin, & Furrer, 2017; †Gephyrosaurus Evans, 1980; †Penegephyrosaurus Whiteside & Duffin, 2017

Extinct family of reptiles

Gephyrosauridae is an extinct family of rhynchocephalians that lived in the Late Triassic and Early Jurassic. They are generally considered to be rhynchocephalians that lie outside of Sphenodontia, but in some analyses they are recovered as more closely related to squamates than to sphenodontians.

== Distribution ==
Members of Gephyrosauridae are known from the United Kingdom, and Switzerland.
