= Deltadectes =

Deltadectes Temporal range: Late Triassic

Scientific classification
- Domain: Eukaryota
- Kingdom: Animalia
- Phylum: Chordata
- Class: Reptilia
- Order: Rhynchocephalia
- Family: †Gephyrosauridae
- Genus: †Deltadectes; Whiteside, Duffin & Furrer, 2017

Type species
- †Deltadectes elvetica Whiteside, Duffin & Furrer, 2017

Extinct genus of reptiles

Deltadectes is an extinct genus of early rhynchocephalian from the Late Triassic Klettgau Formation of Switzerland. It contains a single species, Deltadectes elvetica.
