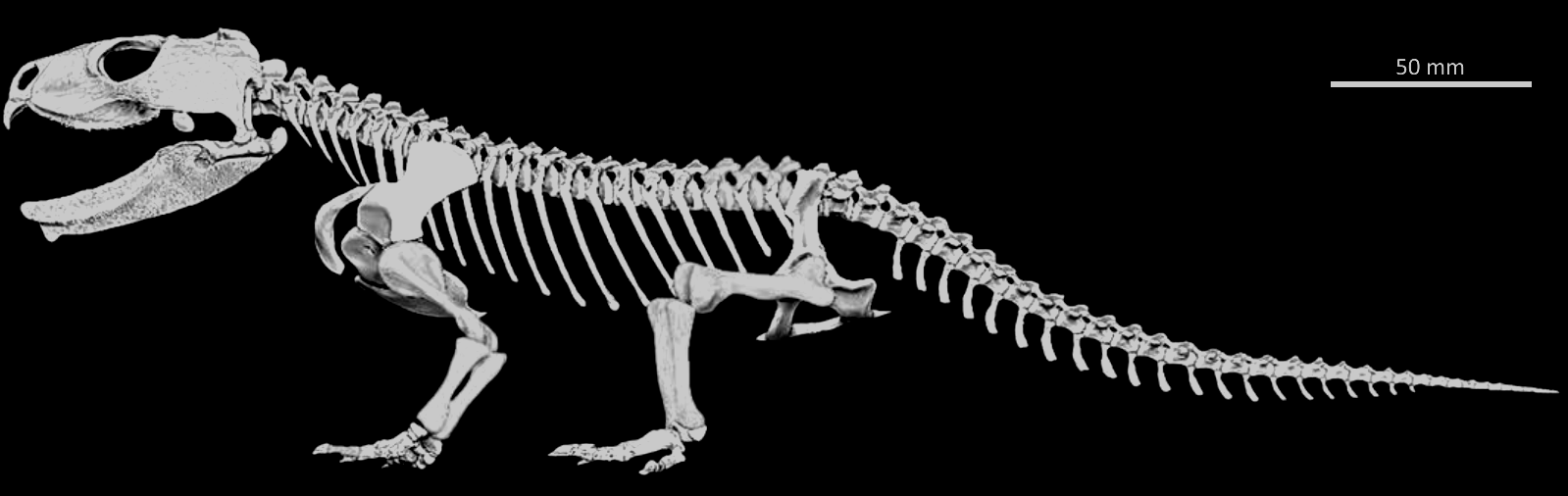
- Skeleton of Priosphenodon avelasi
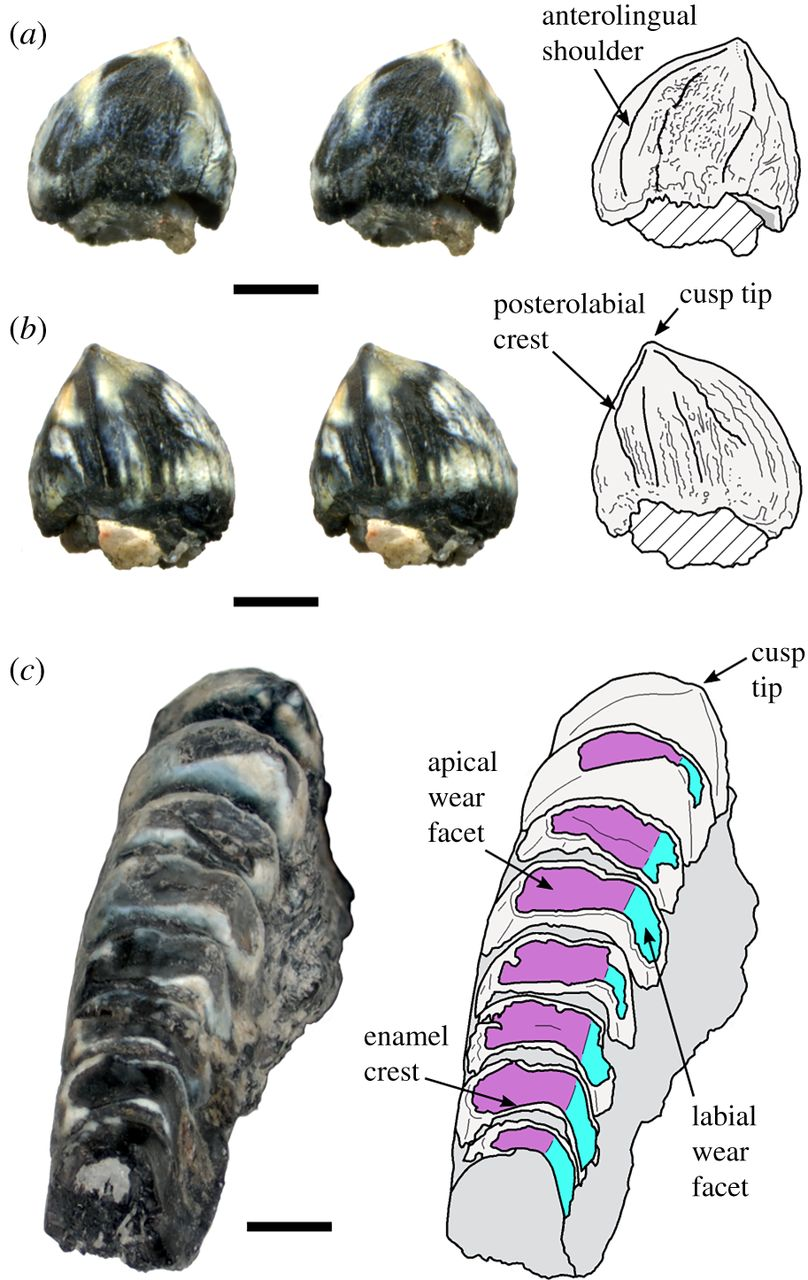
- Teeth and jaws of Eilenodon

Scientific classification
- Kingdom: Animalia
- Phylum: Chordata
- Class: Reptilia
- Order: Rhynchocephalia
- Suborder: Sphenodontia
- Subfamily: †Eilenodontinae; Rasmussen and Callison 1981

Genera
- Eilenodon; Kaikaifilusaurus; Patagosphenos; Priosphenodon; Sphenotitan; Toxolophosaurus; Opisthias?; Fraserosphenodon?

= Eilenodontinae =

Eilenodontinae Temporal range: Late Triassic–Turonian

Subfamily of reptiles (fossil)

Eilenodontinae are an extinct clade of reptiles belonging to Sphenodontia. They are either considered a subgroup of Opisthodontia, or Sphenodontidae. They had deep jaws with broad, closely packed teeth with thick enamel and noticeable wear facets. They were likely herbivorous, and probably chewed with a proal (forward stroke) movement, with food shredded between the edges of opposing sharp-edged wear facets. Members of the group are known from South America, North America and Europe. The earliest known member of the group, Sphenotitan, is known from the Late Triassic of South America. while the youngest members are known from the Late Cretaceous of South America. The group contains some of the largest known sphenodontians, with Priosphenodon suggested to be the largest known non aquatic sphenodontian, with an estimated body length of over 1 metre (3.3 ft).
