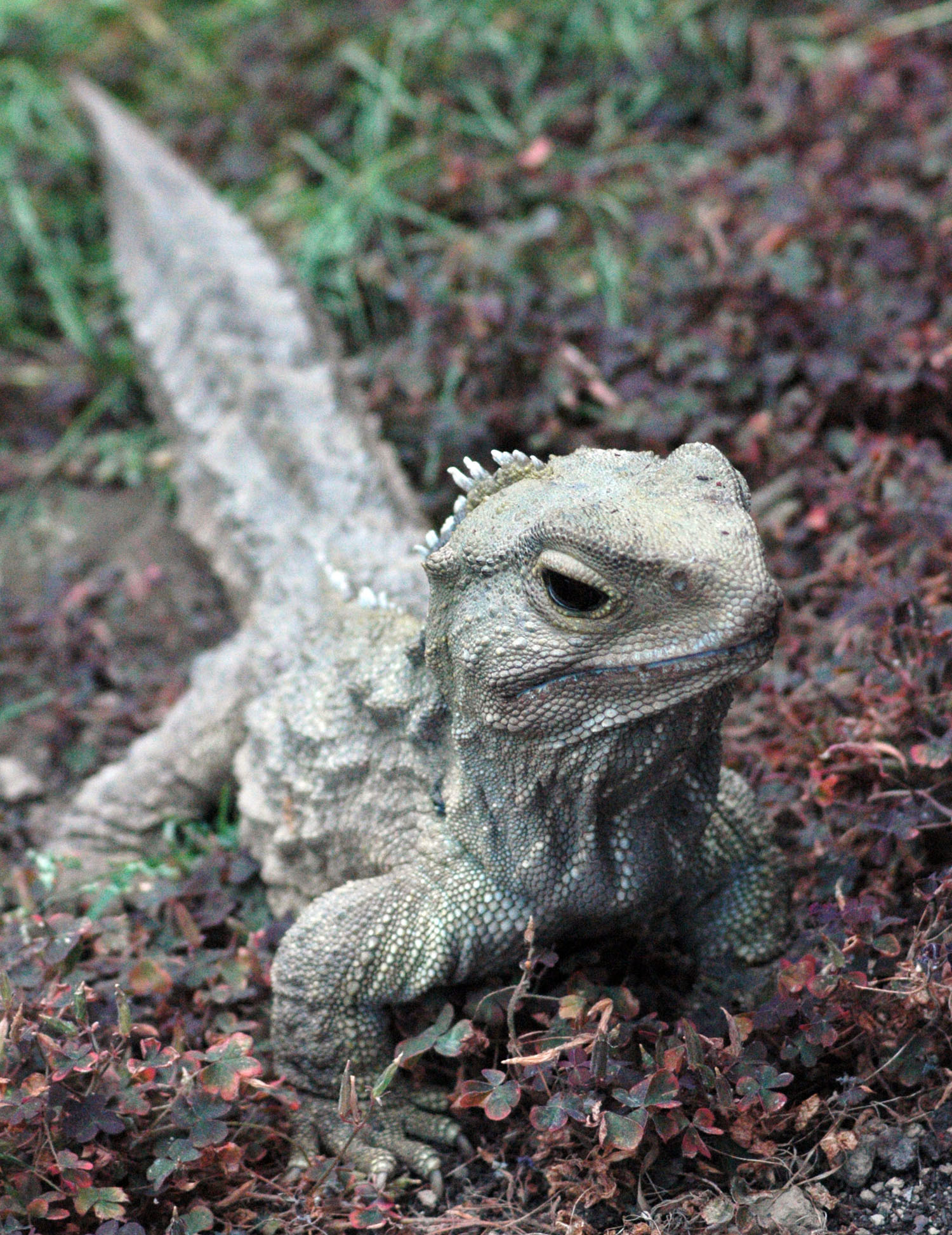
- The tuatara (Sphenodon punctatus), the only living rhynchocephalian
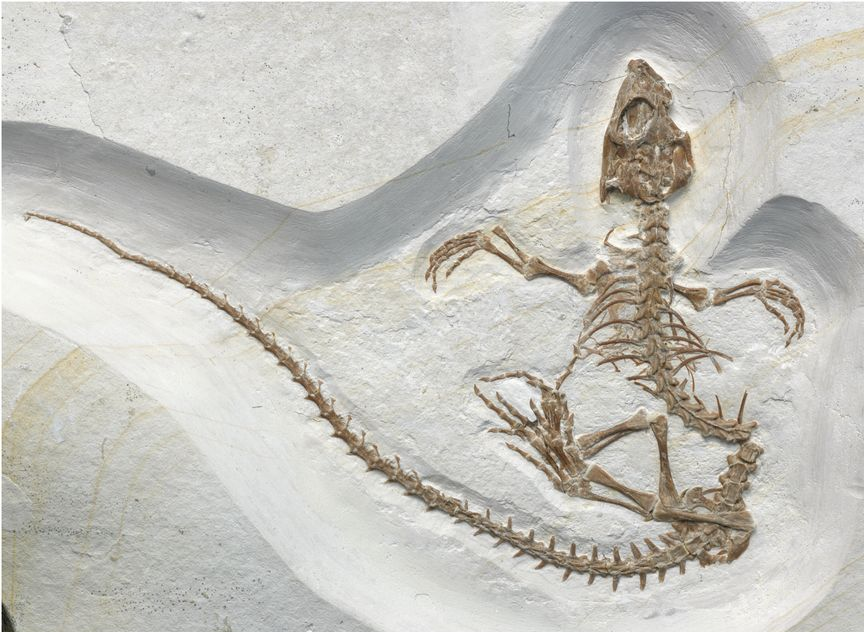
- Fossil of Vadasaurus, a rhynchocephalian from the Late Jurassic of Germany

Scientific classification
- Kingdom: Animalia
- Phylum: Chordata
- Class: Reptilia
- Superorder: Lepidosauria
- Order: Rhynchocephalia; Günther 1867

Type species
- Sphenodon punctatus Gray, 1842

Subgroups
- See text

= Rhynchocephalia =

Rhynchocephalians Temporal range: Middle Triassic-Holocene ~244–0 Ma

Order of reptiles

Rhynchocephalia (/ˌrɪŋkoʊsɪˈfeɪliə/; lit. 'beak-heads') is an order of lizard-like reptiles that includes only one living species, the tuatara (Sphenodon punctatus) of New Zealand. Despite its current lack of diversity, during the Mesozoic rhynchocephalians were a speciose group with high morphological and ecological diversity. The oldest record of the group is dated to the Middle Triassic around 244 million years ago, and they had achieved global distribution by the Early Jurassic. Most rhynchocephalians belong to the suborder Sphenodontia ('wedge-teeth'). Their closest living relatives are lizards and snakes in the order Squamata, with the two orders being grouped together in the superorder Lepidosauria.

Rhynchocephalians are distinguished from squamates by a number of traits, including the retention of rib-like gastralia bones in the belly, and a proatlas bone in the neck as well as most rhynchocephalians having acrodont teeth that are fused to the crests of the jaws (the latter also found among a small number of modern lizard groups like agamids).

Once representing the world's dominant group of small reptiles, many of the niches occupied by lizards today were held by rhynchocephalians during the Triassic and Jurassic. Rhynchocephalians underwent a great decline during the Cretaceous, and they had disappeared almost entirely by the beginning of the Cenozoic. While the modern tuatara is primarily insectivorous and carnivorous, the diversity of the group also included the herbivorous eilenodontines, and there were other rhynchocephalians with specialised ecologies like the durophagous sapheosaurs. There were even successful groups of aquatic sphenodontians, such as the elongate-bodied pleurosaurs.

== Research history ==
Tuatara were originally classified as agamid lizards when they were first described by John Edward Gray in 1831. They remained misclassified until 1867, when Albert Günther of the British Museum noted features similar to birds, turtles, and crocodiles. He proposed the order Rhynchocephalia (from Ancient Greek ῥύγχος (rhúnkhos) 'beak' and κεφαλή (kephalḗ) 'head', meaning "beak head") for the tuatara and its fossil relatives. In 1925, Samuel Wendell Williston proposed the Sphenodontia to include only tuatara and their closest fossil relatives. Sphenodon is derived from Ancient Greek σφήν (sphḗn) 'wedge' and ὀδούς (odoús) 'tooth'. Many disparately related species were subsequently added to the Rhynchocephalia, resulting in what taxonomists call a "wastebasket taxon". These include the superficially similar (both in shape and name) but unrelated rhynchosaurs, which lived in the Triassic. Studies in the 1970s and 1980s demonstrated that many rhynchosaurs were unrelated, with computer-based cladistic analysis conducted in the 1980s providing a robust diagnosis for the definition of the group.

== Anatomy ==
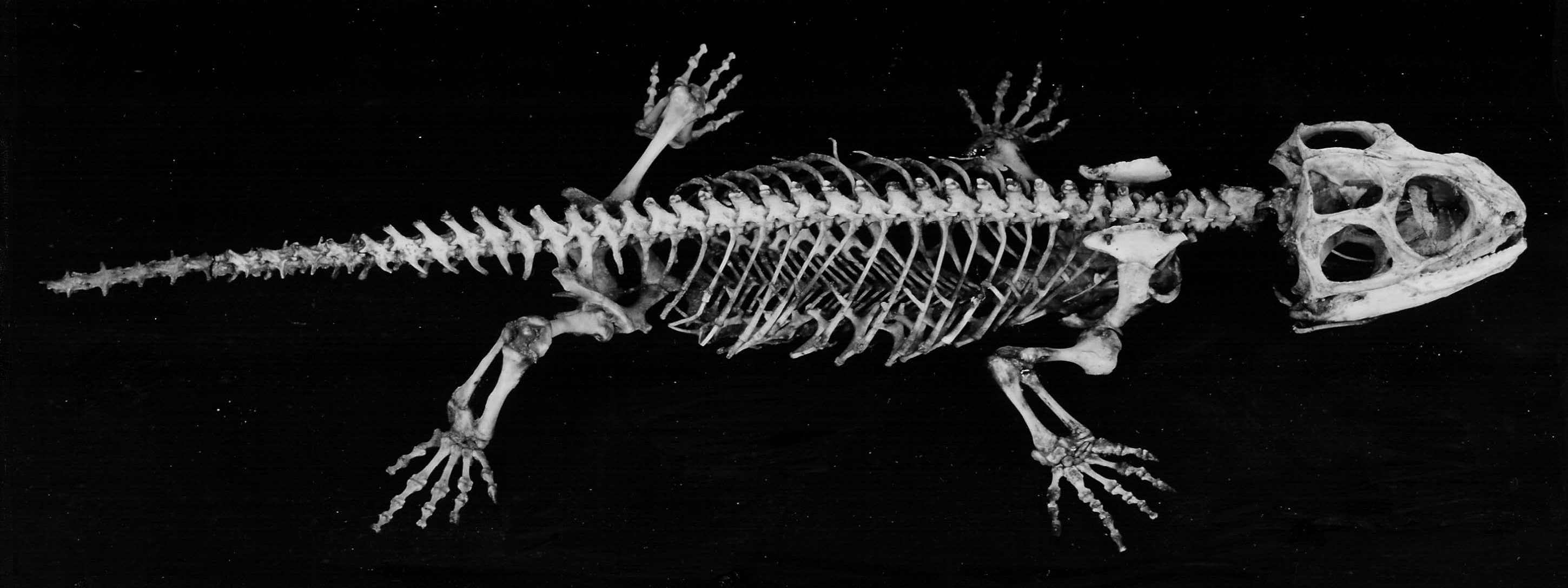
Skeleton of the tuatara (Sphenodon punctatus)

Rhynchocephalia and their sister group Squamata (which includes lizards, snakes and amphisbaenians) belong to the superorder Lepidosauria, the only surviving taxon within Lepidosauromorpha.

Squamates and rhynchocephalians have a number of shared traits (synapomorphies), including fracture planes within the tail vertebrae allowing caudal autotomy (loss of the tail when threatened), transverse cloacal slits, an opening in the pelvis known as the thyroid fenestra, the presence of extra ossification centres in the limb bone epiphyses, a knee joint where a lateral recess on the femur allows the articulation of the fibula, the development of a sexual segment of the kidney, and a number of traits of the feet bones, including a fused astralago-calcaneun and enlarged fourth distal tarsal, which creates a new joint, along with a hooked fifth metatarsal.

Like some lizards, the tuatara possesses a parietal eye (also called a pineal eye or a third eye) covered by scales at the top of the head formed by the parapineal organ, with an accompanying hole in the skull roof enclosed by the parietal bones, dubbed the "pineal foramen", which is also present in fossil rhynchocephalians. The parietal eye detects light (though it is probably not capable of detecting movement or forming images), monitoring the day-night and seasonal cycles, helping to regulate the circadian rhythm, among other functions. While parietal eyes were widespread among early vertebrates, including early reptiles, they have been lost among most living groups.

Rhynchocephalians are distinguished from squamates by a number of traits, including the retention of gastralia (rib-like bones present in the belly of the body, ancestrally present in tetrapods and also present in living crocodilians). Unlike squamates, but similar to the majority of birds, the tuatara lacks a penis. This is a secondary loss, as a penis or squamate-like hemipenes were probably present in the last common ancestor of rhynchocephalians and squamates.

Skull of the basal rhynchocephalian Planocephalosaurus, which has an open lower temporal fenestra

The complete lower temporal bar (caused by the fusion of the jugal and quadtrate/quadratojugal bones of the skull) of the tuatara, often historically asserted to be a primitive feature retained from earlier reptiles, is actually a derived feature among sphenodontians, with primitive lepidosauromorphs and many rhynchocephalians including the most primitive ones having an open lower temporal fenestra without a temporal bar. While often lacking a complete temporal bar, the vast majority of rhynchocephalians have a posteriorly directed process (extension) of the jugal bone. All known rhynchocephalians lack the splenial bone present in the lower jaw of more primitive reptiles, with the skulls of all members of Sphenodontia lacking lacrimal bones. The majority of rhynchocephalians also have fused frontal bones of the skull. While early rhynchocephalians possessed a tympanic membrane in the ear and a corresponding quadrate conch, similar to those found in lizards, these have been lost in the tuatara and likely other derived rhynchocephalians. This loss may be connected to the development of back and forth motion of the lower jaw.

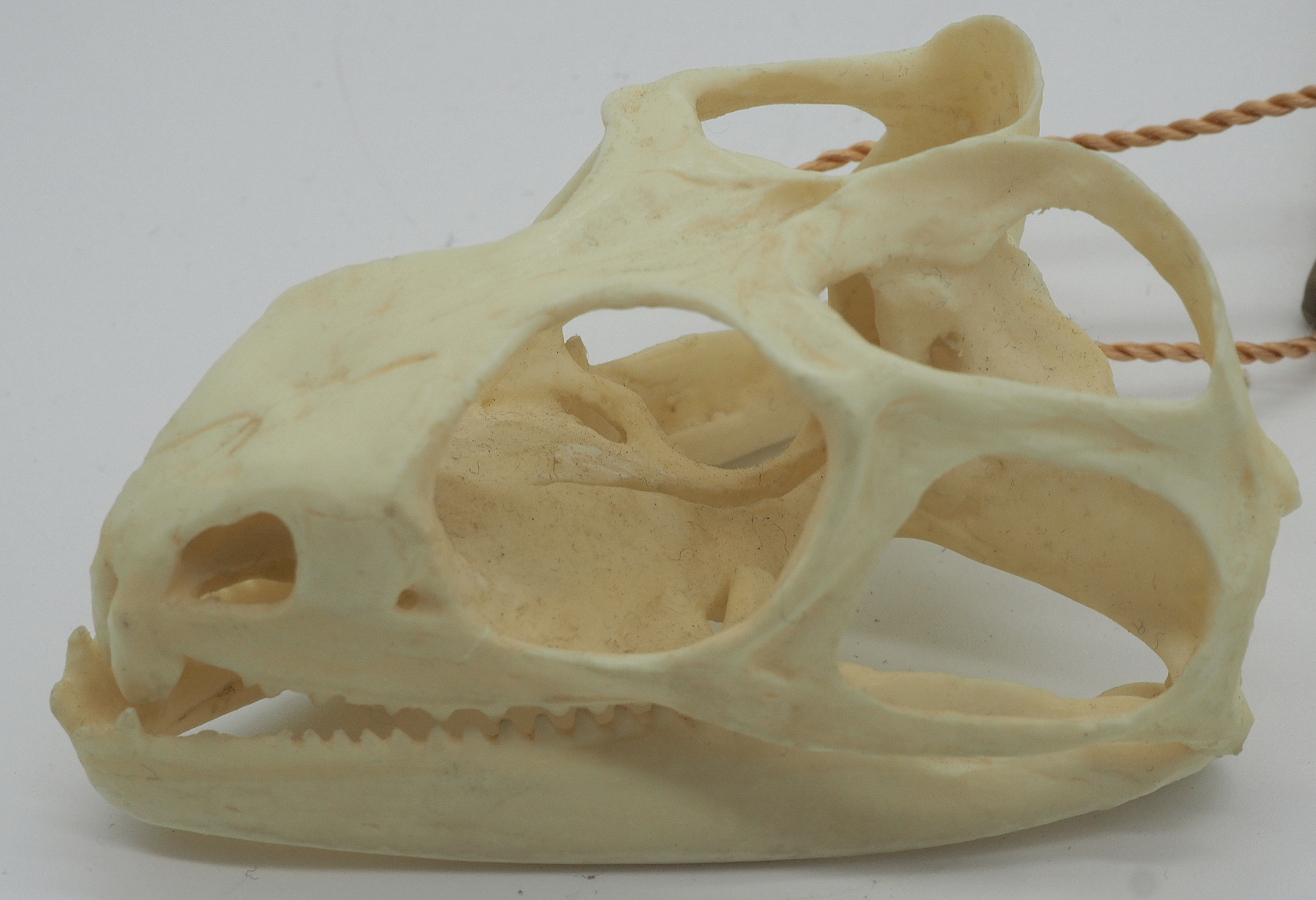
Skull of the tuatara in oblique view

The dentition of most rhynchocephalians, including the tuatara, is described as acrodont, which is associated with the condition of the teeth being attached to the crest of the jaw bone, lacking tooth replacement and having extensive bone growth fusing the teeth to the jaws resulting in the boundary between the teeth and bone being difficult to discern. This differs from the condition found in most lizards (except acrodontans), which have pleurodont teeth which are attached to the shelf on the inward-facing side of the jaw, and are replaced throughout life. The teeth of the tuatara have no roots, though the teeth of some other rhynchocephalians possess roots (in addition, the precise technical meaning of term "acrodont" is somewhat ambiguous and the term is used with inconsistent meanings by different researchers). The acrodont dentition appears to be a derived character of rhynchocephalians not found in more primitive lepidosauromorphs. The most primitive rhynchocephalians have either pleurodont teeth or a combination of both pleurodont front and acrodont posterior teeth. Some rhynchocephalians differ from these conditions, with Ankylosphenodon having superficially acrodont teeth that continue deeply into the jaw bone, and are fused to the bone at the base of the socket (ankylothecodont). In many derived sphenodontians, the premaxillary teeth at the front of the upper jaw are merged into a large chisel-like structure.

Rhynchocephalians possess palatal dentition (teeth present on the bones of the roof of the mouth). Palatal teeth are ancestrally present in tetrapods, but have been lost in many groups. The earliest rhynchocephalians had teeth present on the palatine, vomer and pterygoid bones, though the vomer and/or the pterygoid teeth are lost in some groups, including the living tuatara, which only has palatine teeth. A distinctive character found in all rhynchocephalians is the enlargement of the tooth row present on the palatine bones. While in other rhynchocephalians the palatine tooth row is oblique to the teeth of the maxilla, in members of Sphenodontinae (including the tuatara) and Eilenodontinae it is orientated parallel to the maxilla. In these groups, during biting, the teeth of the dentary in the lower jaw slot between the maxillary and palatine tooth rows. This arrangement, which is unique among amniotes, permits three point bending of food items, and in combination with propalinal movement (back and forward motion of the lower jaw) allows for a shearing bite.

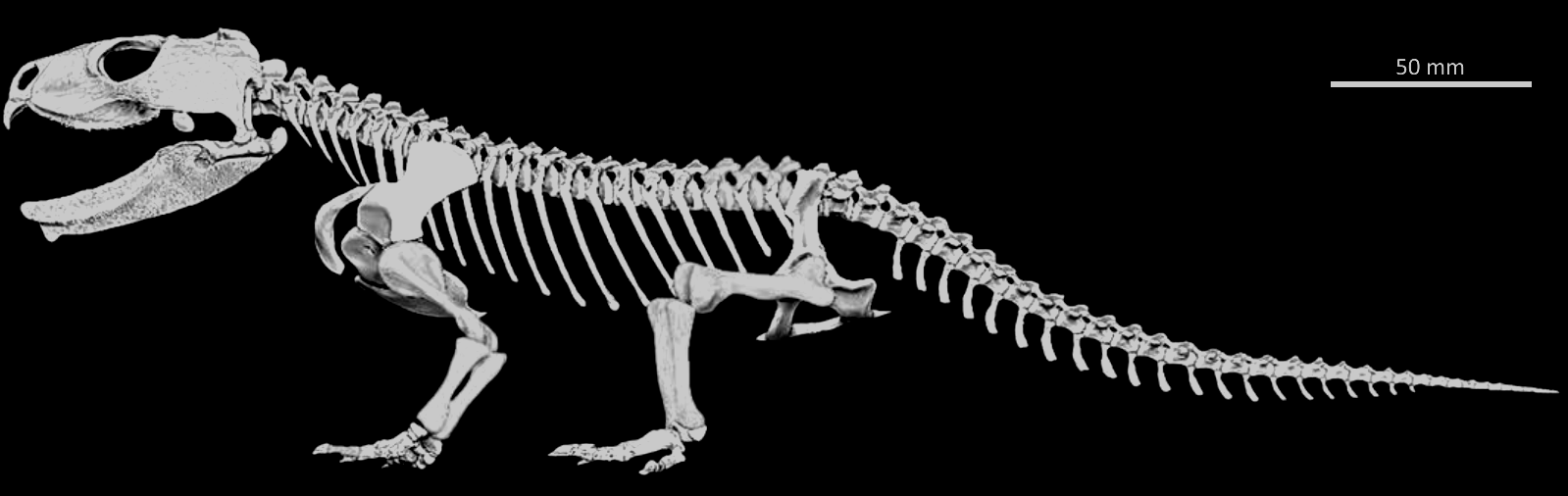
Skeleton of the herbivorous eilenodontine Priosphenodon avelasi, one of the largest known sphenodontians

The body size of rhynchocephalians is highly variable. The tuatara has an average total length of 34.8 and 42.7 centimetres (13.7 and 16.8 in) for females and males respectively. Clevosaurus sectumsemper has an estimated total length of 12 centimetres (4.7 in), while large individuals of the largest known terrestrial sphenodontian, Priosphenodon avelasi reached total lengths of just over 100 centimetres (39 in). The aquatic pleurosaurs reached lengths of up to 150 centimetres (59 in).

Most derived rhynchocephalians have the number of presacral vertebrae (the number of vertebrae forward of the sacrum) typically around 23-25, though the number is much greater in pleurosaurs, where it reaches up to 57 in some individuals. Seven cervical vertebrae in the neck may be typical for rhynchocephalians as it is for the tuatara. The tuatara has paired proatlas bones between the atlas (the first neck vertebra) and the skull, which is widely assumed to be an ancestral feature among reptiles, but which has been lost in squamates. Proatlas bones have not been definitely identified in fossil rhynchocephalians, which may reflect the difficulty in recognising them in fossils rather than genuine absence. Rhynchocephalians typically have amphicoelous vertebral centra (both faces are concave) on their presacral vertebrae.

The tuatara has among the highest known ages of sexual maturity among reptiles, at around 9 to 13 years of age, and has a high longevity in comparison to lizards of similar size, with wild individuals likely reaching 70 years, and possibly over 100 years in age. Such a late onset of sexual maturity and longevity may have or not have been typical of extinct rhynchocephalians.

== Classification ==
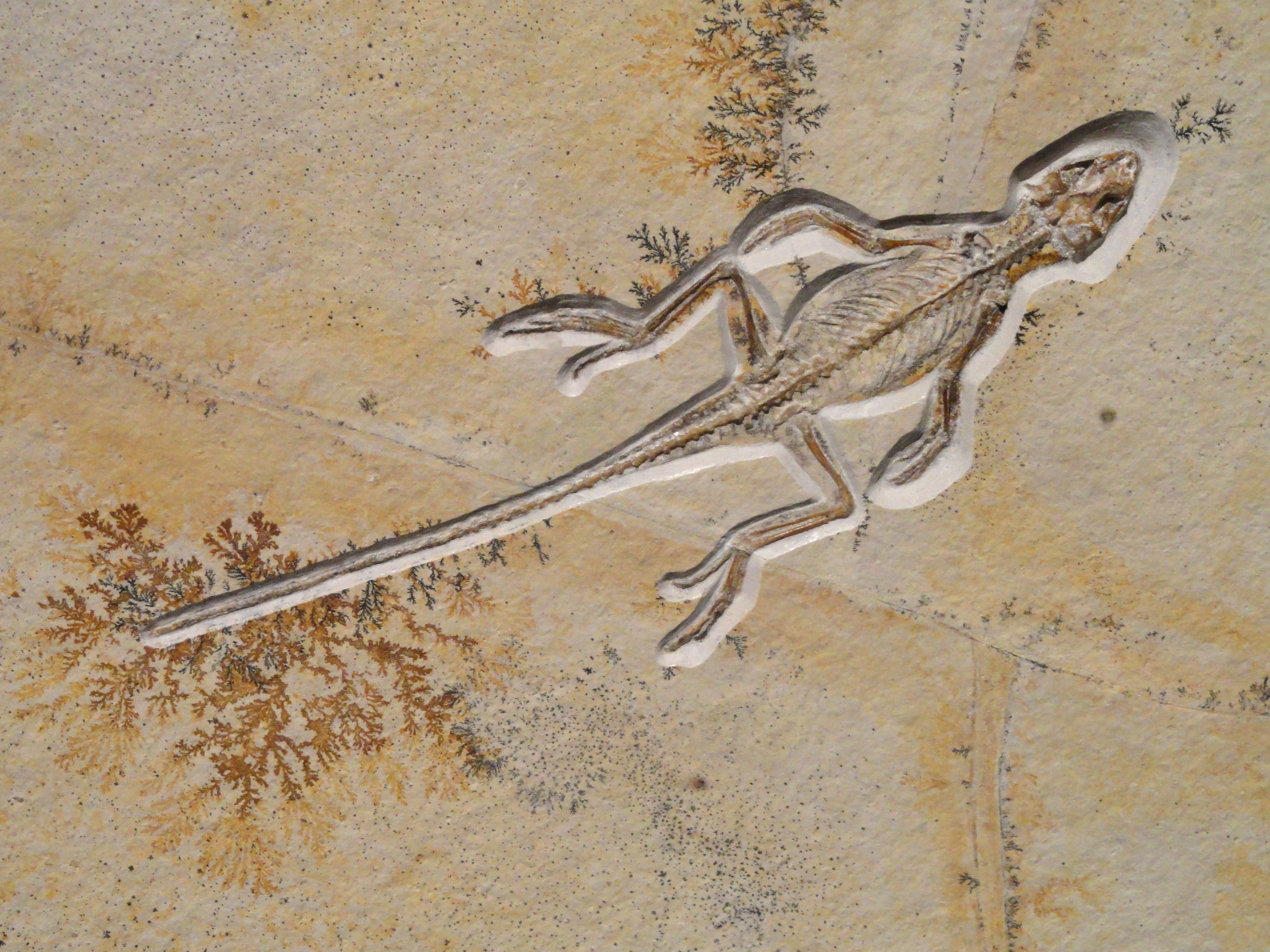
Homeosaurus maximiliani from the Late Jurassic of Germany

While the grouping of Rhynchocephalia is well supported, the relationships of many taxa to each other are uncertain, varying substantially between studies. In modern cladistics, the clade Sphenodontia includes all rhynchocephalians other than Wirtembergia, as well as Gephyrosaurus and other gephyrosaurids. Gephyrosaurids have been found as more closely related to squamates in some analyses. In 2018, two major clades within Sphenodontia were defined, the infraorder Eusphenodontia which is defined by the least inclusive clade containing Polysphenodon, Clevosaurus hudsoni and Sphenodon, which is supported by the presence of three synapomorphies, including the presence of clearly visible wear facets on the teeth of the dentary or maxilla, the premaxillary teeth are merged into a chisel like structure, and the palatine teeth are reduced to a single tooth row, with the presence of an additional isolated tooth. The unranked clade Neosphenodontia is defined as the most inclusive clade containing Sphenodon but not Clevosaurus hudsoni, which is supported by the presence of six synapomorphies, including the increased relative length of the antorbital region of the skull (the part of the skull forward of the eye socket), reaching 1/4 to 1/3 of the total skull length, the posterior (hind) edge of the parietal bone is only slightly curved inward, the parietal foramen is found at the same level or forward of the anterior border of the supratemporal fenestra (an opening of the skull), the palatine teeth are further reduced from the condition in eusphenodontians to a single lateral tooth row, the number of pterygoid tooth rows are reduced to one or none, and the posterior border of the ischium is characterised by a distinctive process. In 2021 the clade Acrosphenodontia was defined, which is less inclusive than Sphenodontia and more inclusive than Eusphenodontia, and includes all sphenodontians with fully acrodont dentition, excluding basal partially acrodont sphenodontians. In 2022 the extinct clade Leptorhynchia was defined, including a variety of neosphenodontians, at least some of which were aquatically adapted, characterised by the elongation of the fourth metacarpal, the presence of a posterior process on the ischium, and the antorbital region of the skulls is between a third and a quarter of the total skull length. The clade Opisthodontia has been used for the grouping of all sphenodontians more closely related to Priosphenodon (a member of Eilenodontinae) than to Sphenodon. Not all studies use this clade, as some studies have found the scope of the clade to be identical to Eilenodontinae.

The family Sphenodontidae has been used to include the tuatara and its closest relatives within Rhynchocephalia. However the grouping has lacked a formal definition, with the included taxa varying substantially between analyses. The closest relatives of the tuatara are placed in the clade Sphenodontinae, which are characterised by a completely closed temporal bar.

The following is a cladogram of Rhynchocephalia after DeMar et al. 2022 (based on maximum parsimony, note that cladogram collapses into a polytomy under Bayesian analysis):

- - Rhynchocephalia
    - Gephyrosaurus bridensis
    - Sphenodontia
      - Diphydontosaurus avonis
      - Acrosphenodontia
        - Planocephalosaurus robinsonae
        - - Rebbanasaurus jaini
          - - - Godavarisaurus lateefi
              - Theretairus antiquus
            - Eusphenodontia
              - Polysphenodon mulleri
              - - Opisthiamimus gregori
                - - Clevosauridae
                    - - Clevosaurus convallis
                      - - Clevosaurus brasiliensis
                        - Clevosaurus hadroprodon
                    - - Clevosaurus bairdi
                      - - Clevosaurus hudsoni
                        - Clevosaurus cambrica
                  - Neosphenodontia
                    - Brachyrhinodon taylori
                    - - Colobops noviportensis
                      - - Sphenodontidae
                          - Sphenodon punctatus (tuatara)
                          - Cynosphenodon huizachalensis
                          - Sphenovipera jimmysjoyi
                          - - Kawasphenodon expectatus
                            - Kawasphenodon peligrensis
                          - Pelecymala robustus
                          - Eilenodontinae
                            - - Fraserosphenodon latidens
                              - Opisthias rarus
                            - - Eilenodon robustus
                              - - Sphenotitan leyesi
                                - - Toxolophosaurus cloudi
                                  - Priosphenodon avelasi
                        - Leptorhynchia
                          - - Homoeosaurus maximiliani
                            - Kallimodon pulchellus
                          - - - Sigmala sigmala
                              - Vadasaurus herzogi
                            - Pleurosauridae
                              - Palaeopleurosaurus posidonae
                              - - Pleurosaurus goldfussi
                                - Pleurosaurus ginsburgi
                          - Kallimodon cerinensis
                          - Sapheosauridae
                            - Sapheosaurus thiollierei
                            - - Ankylosphenodon pachyostosus
                              - Oenosaurus muehlheimensis

Cladogram after Simoes et al. 2022 (based on Bayesian inference analysis), with better resolved relations of Sphenodontidae and particularly Sphenodontinae:

- Sphenodontia
  - †Diphydontosaurus
  - Eusphenodontia
    - †Planocephalosaurus
    - †Clevosaurus
    - Neosphenodontia
      - - - †Homoeosaurus
          - Pleurosauridae
            - †Palaeopleurosaurus
            - - †Derasmosaurus
              - †Pleurosaurus
          - - - †Leptosaurus
              - †Kallimodon
            - Sapheosauridae
              - †Piocormus
              - †Oenosaurus
              - †Sapheosaurus
        - Sphenodontidae
          - Eilenodontinae
            - †Sphenotitan
            - - †Eilenodon
              - - †Toxolophosaurus
                - †Priosphenodon
          - Sphenodontinae
            - †Navajosphenodon
            - †Cynosphenodon
            - - †Sphenofontis
              - - †Kawasphenodon
                - Sphenodon (tuatara)

=== Clades and genera ===
- †Wirtembergia
- †Gephyrosauridae?
  - †Deltadectes
  - †Gephyrosaurus
  - †Penegephyrosaurus
- †Bharatagama?
- Sphenodontia Williston 1925
  - †Agriodontosaurus
  - †Diphydontosaurus
  - †Micromenodon
  - †Paleollanosaurus?
  - †Parvosaurus
  - †Pelecymala
  - †Whitakersaurus
  - Acrosphenodontia Chambi-Trowell et al., 2021
    - †Coloradosphenodon
    - †Godavarisaurus
    - †Planocephalosaurus
    - †Rebbanasaurus
    - †Theretairus
    - †Sphenocondor
    - Eusphenodontia Herrera-Flores et al. 2018
      - †Brachyrhinodon
      - †Colobops?
      - †Lanceirosphenodon
      - †Opisthiamimus
      - †Polysphenodon
      - †Clevosauridae
        - †Brachyrhinodon?
        - †Clevosaurus
        - †Polysphenodon?
      - †Microsphenodon
      - †Sigmala
      - †Trullidens
      - Neosphenodontia Herrera-Flores et al. 2018
        - †Derasmosaurus
        - †Lamarquesaurus
        - †Pamizinsaurus
        - †Tingitana
        - †Opisthodontia
          - †Alamitosphenos
          - †Eilenodontinae
        - Sphenodontidae
          - †Eilenodontinae?
            - †Eilenodon
            - †Kaikaifilusaurus
            - †Patagosphenos
            - †Priosphenodon
            - †Sphenotitan
            - †Toxolophosaurus
            - †Opisthias?
            - †Fraserosphenodon?
          - Sphenodontinae
            - †Cynosphenodon
            - †Tika
            - †Sphenofontis
            - †Navajosphenodon
            - †Kawasphenodon
            - †Notosphenos
            - Sphenodon
        - †Leptorhynchia DeMar, Jones & Carrano, 2022
          - †Homoeosaurus
          - †Kallimodon
          - †Leptosaurus
          - †Vadasaurus
          - †Ankylosphenodon
          - †Sphenodraco
          - †Sapheosauridae
            - †Oenosaurus
            - †Piocormus
            - †Sapheosaurus
          - †Pleurosauridae
            - †Palaeopleurosaurus
            - †Pleurosaurus
            - †?Derasmosaurus
            - †?Vadasaurus
            - †?Ankylosphenodon
Gallery of rhynchocephalian skull diversity
Skull reconstruction of Gephyrosaurus, a likely basal rhynchocephalian

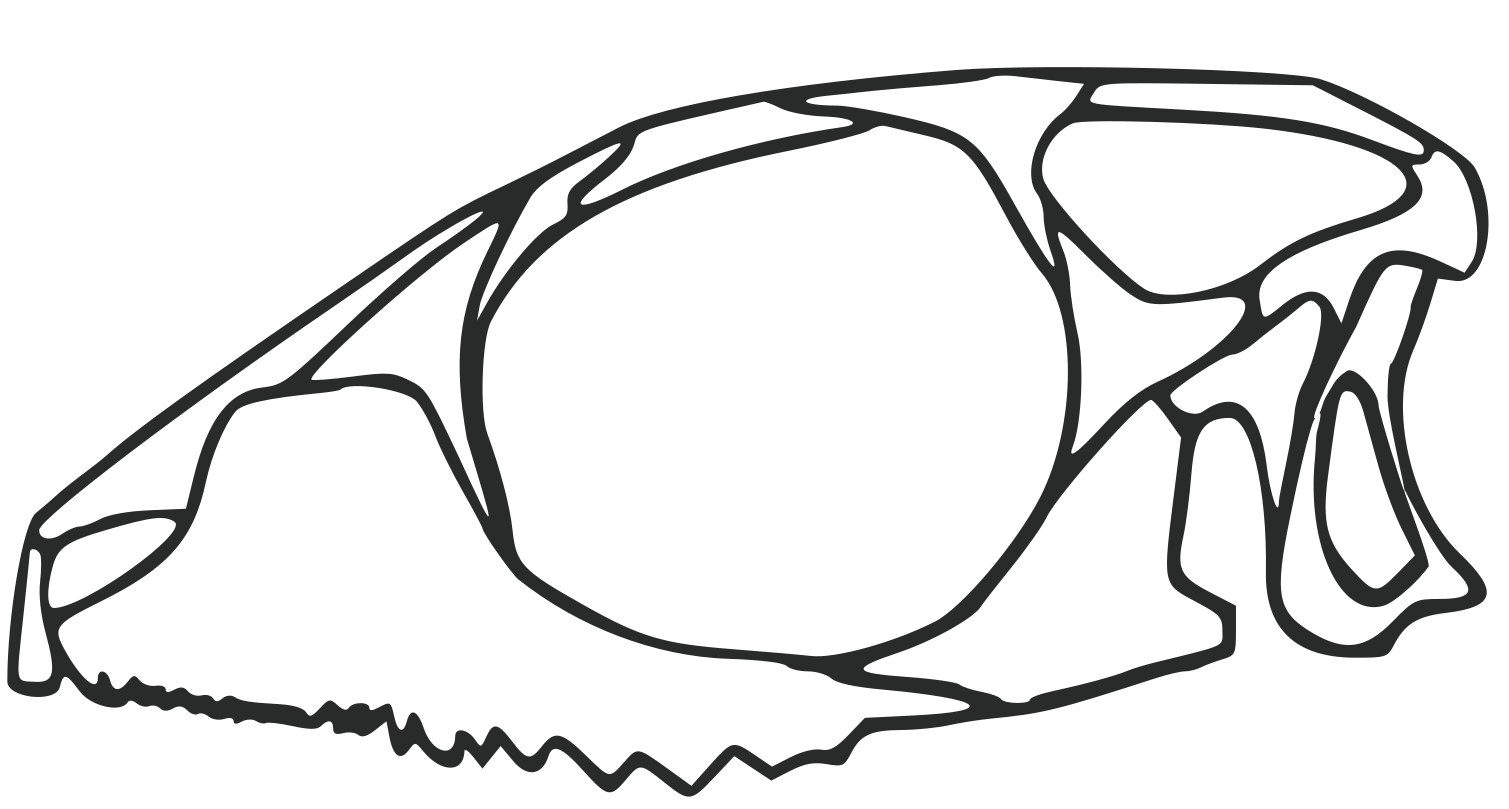
Reconstruction of the skull of Diphydontosaurus, a basal member of Sphenodontia

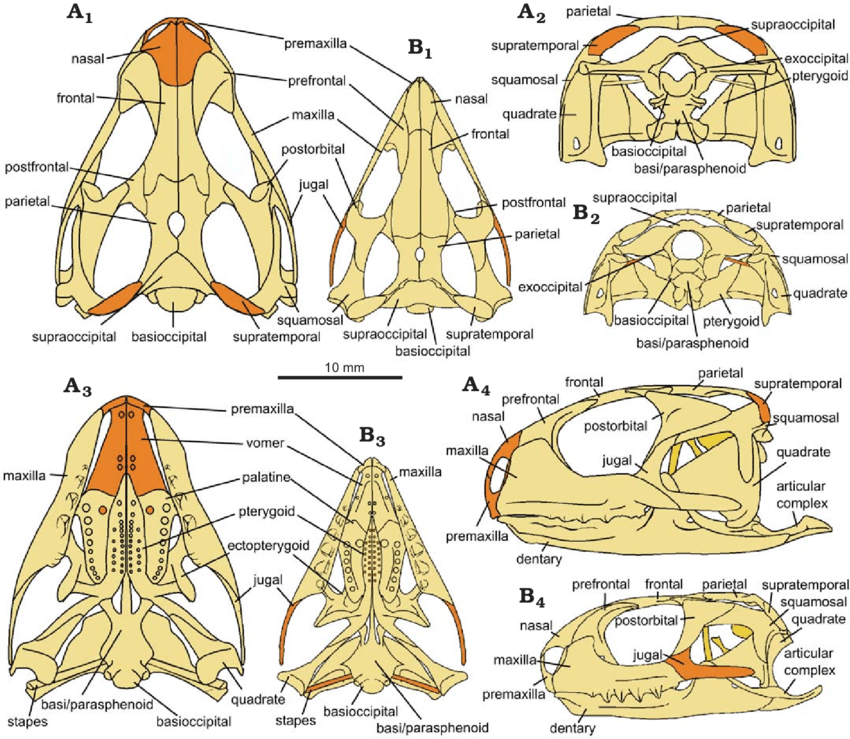
Reconstruction of the skulls of Clevosaurus hudsoni (A) and Clevosaurus cambrica (B)

Skull of the basal eusphenodontian Opisthiamimus

Skull of Sphenotitan, an early member of Eilenodontinae

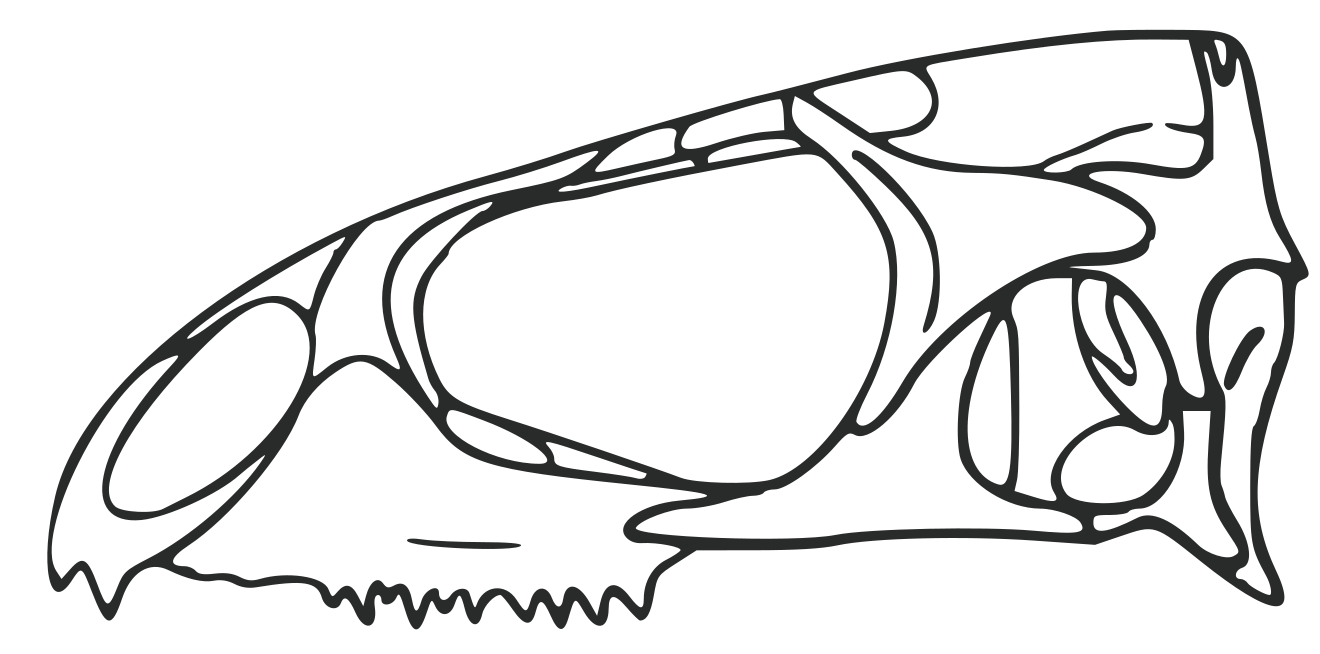
Reconstruction of the skull of Navajosphenodon, an early member of Sphenodontinae

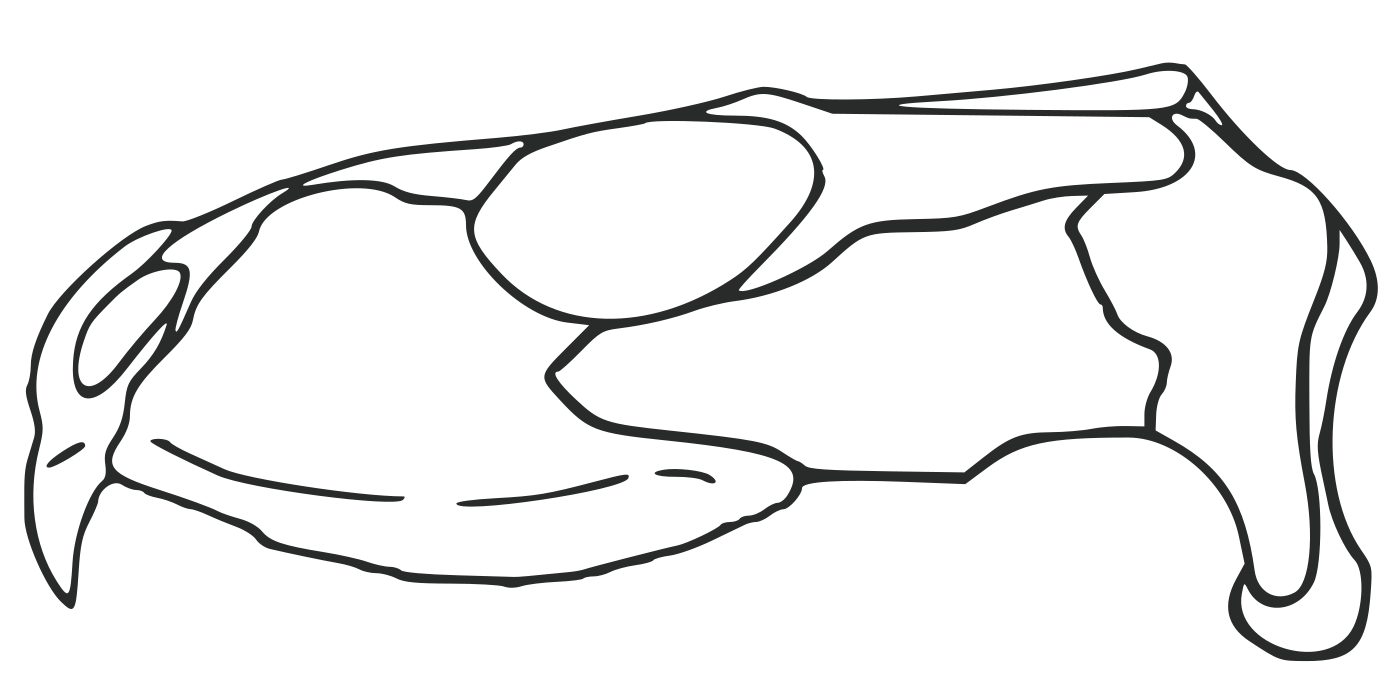
Reconstruction of the skull of the eilenodontine Priosphenodon

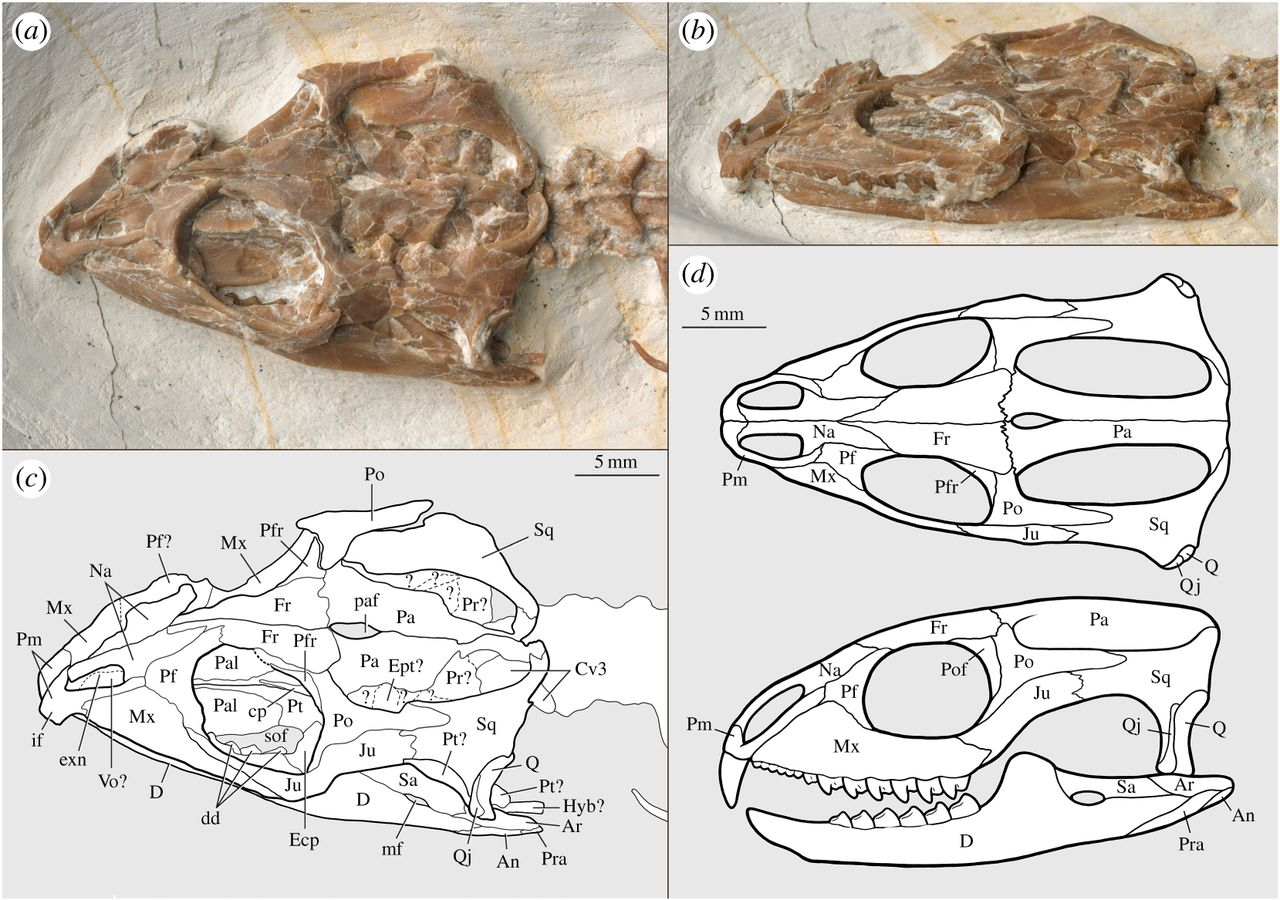
Skull of the neosphenodontian Vadasaurus

Skull of Pleurosaurus

Skull diagram of the modern tuatara (Sphenodon punctatus)

== Ecology ==
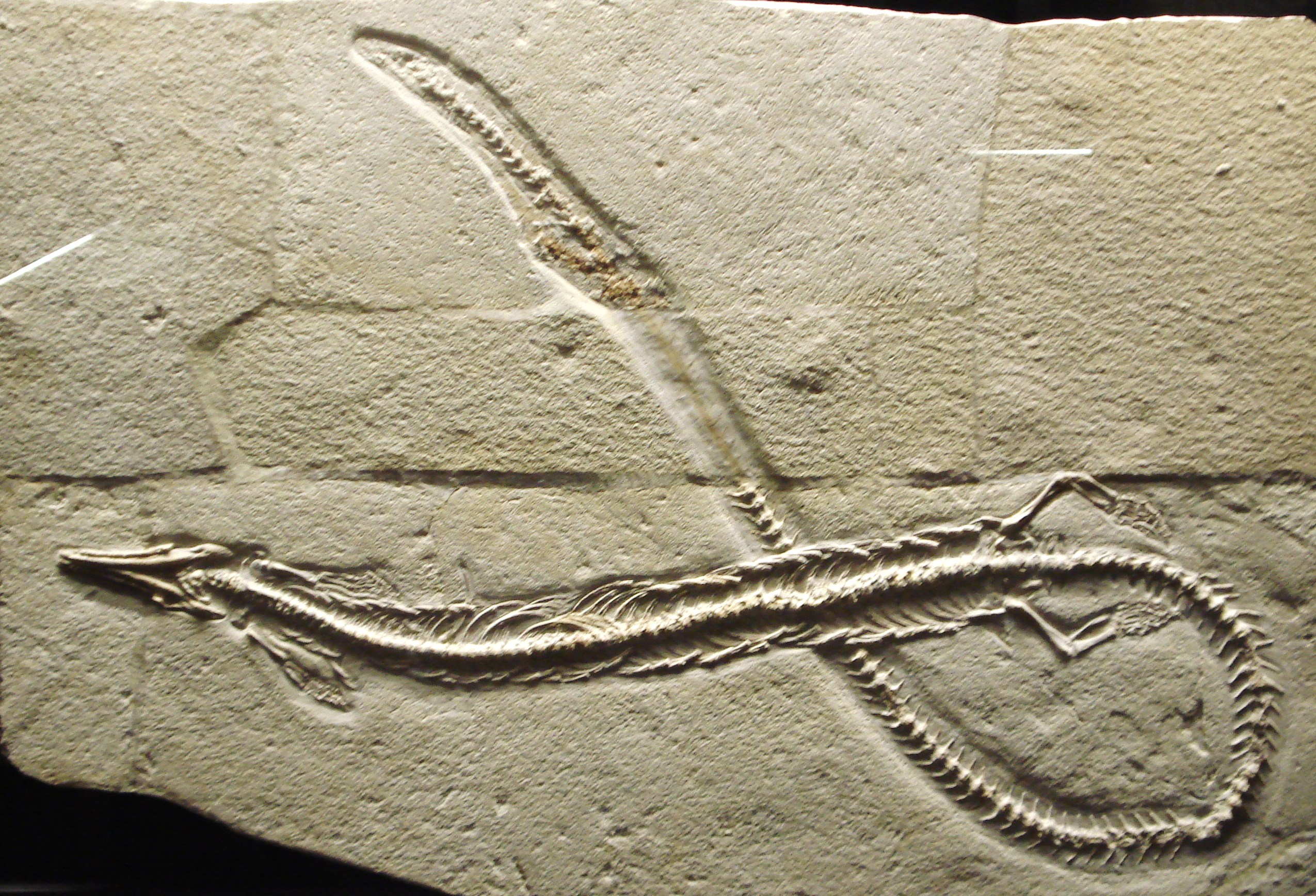
Skeleton of Pleurosaurus, an aquatically adapted sphenodontian from the Late Jurassic of Germany

The fossil record of rhynchocephalians demonstrates that they were a diverse group that exploited a wide array of ecological niches. Early rhynchocephalians possess small ovoid teeth designed for piercing, and were probably insectivores. Like modern tuatara, extinct members of Sphenodontinae were likely generalists with a carnivorous/insectivorous diet. Amongst the most distinct rhynchocephalians are the pleurosaurs, known from the Jurassic of Europe, which were adapted for marine life, with elongated snake-like bodies with reduced limbs, with the specialised Late Jurassic genus Pleurosaurus having an elongated triangular skull highly modified from those of other rhynchocephalians. Pleurosaurs are thought to have been piscivores (consuming fish). Several other lineages of rhynchocephalians, such as Kallimodon and Leptosaurus have been suggested to have had semi-aquatic habits, with fish found as gut contents in one Kallimodon specimen.

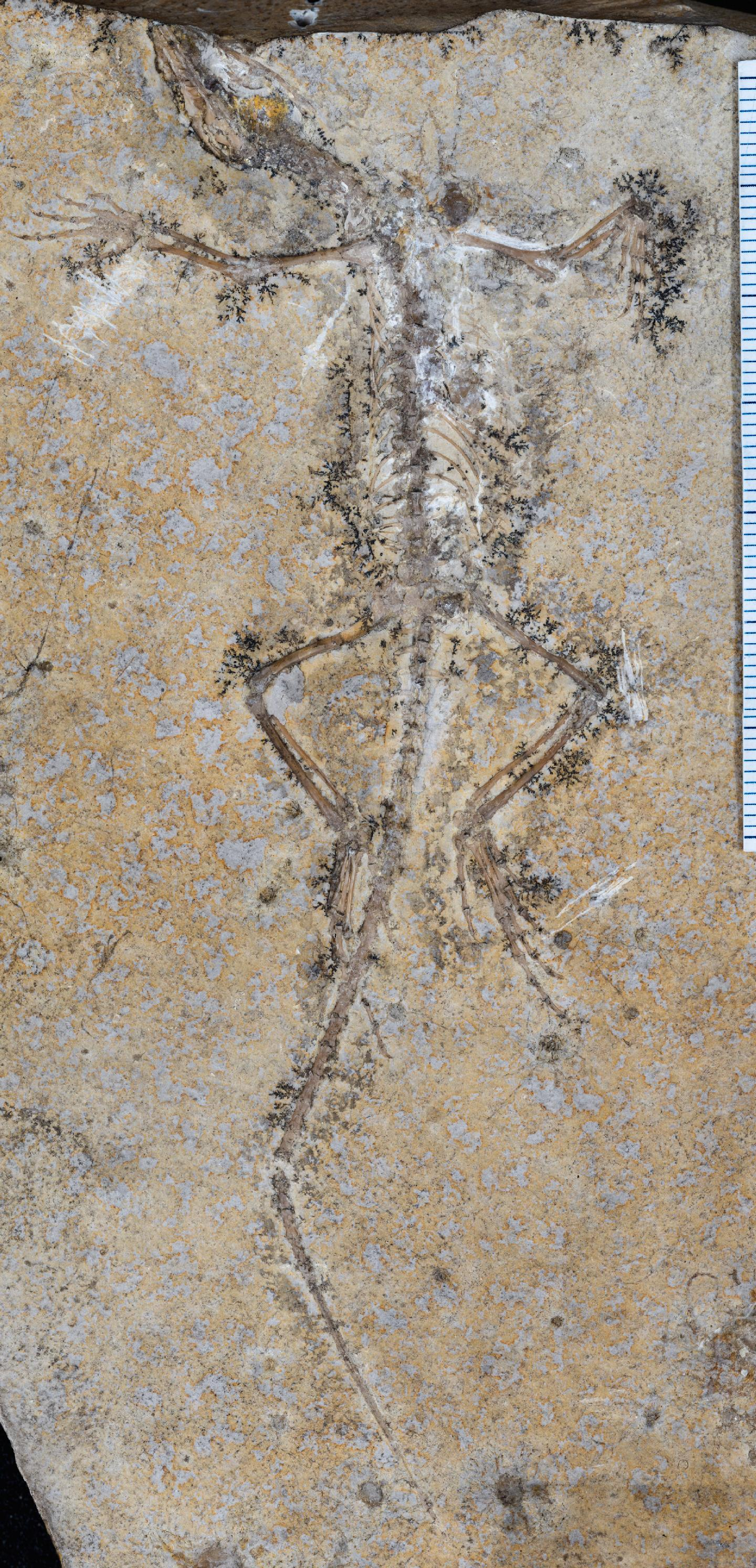
Skeleton of Sphenodraco, an arboreal, tree-climbing rhynchocephalian from the Late Jurassic of Germany

Eilenodontines are thought to have been herbivorous, with batteries of wide teeth with thick enamel used to process plant material. The sapheosaurids, such as Oenosaurus and Sapheosaurus from the Late Jurassic of Europe possess broad tooth plates unique amongst tetrapods, and are thought to have been durophagous, with the tooth plates being used to crush hard shelled organisms. Sphenovipera from the Jurassic of Mexico has been suggested to have been venomous, based on presence of grooves on two enlarged teeth at the front of the lower jaw though this interpretation has been questioned by other authors. The body of Pamizinsaurus from the Early Cretaceous of Mexico was covered in osteoscutes, similar to those of helodermatid lizards like the Gila monster, which is unique among known sphenodontians, which probably served to protect it against predators. The limb bone proportions and shape of the hand and foot bones of Sphenodraco from the Late Jurassic of Germany indicate that it was a primarily arboreal tree climbing animal, unlike the largely terrestrial tuatara. Other extinct rhynchocephalians with relatively long limbs such as Navajosphenodon and Homoeosaurus may also have exhibited climbing capabilities.

== Evolutionary history ==
Skulls of Clevosaurus hudsoni (left) and Clevosaurus cambrica (right)

The timing of when Rhynchocephalia is estimated to have diverged from Squamata is disputed. Older estimates place the divergence between the Middle Permian and earliest Triassic, around 270 to 252 million years ago, while other authors posit a younger date of around 242 million years ago. The oldest known definitive rhynchocephalian is Agriodontosaurus from the Helsby Sandstone Formation of Devon, UK dating to the upper Anisian stage of the Middle Triassic, approximately 244 to 241.5 million years ago. The next earliest rhynchocephalian is Wirtembergia which is known from the Erfurt Formation near Vellberg in Southern Germany, dating to the Ladinian stage of the Middle Triassic, around 238-240 million years old. Rhynchocephalians underwent considerable diversification during the Late Triassic, and reached a worldwide distribution across Pangaea by the end of the Triassic, with the Late Triassic-Early Jurassic genus Clevosaurus having 10 species across Asia, Africa, Europe, North and South America. The earliest rhynchocephalians were small animals, but by the Late Triassic the group had evolved a wide range of body sizes. During the Jurassic, rhynchocephalians were the dominant group of small reptiles globally, reaching their apex of morphological diversity during this period, including specialised herbivorous and aquatic forms. The only record of Rhynchocephalians from Asia (excluding the Indian subcontinent, which was not part of Asia during the Mesozoic) are indeterminate remains of Clevosaurus from the Early Jurassic (Sinemurian) aged Lufeng Formation of Yunnan, China. Rhynchocephalians are noticeably absent from younger localities in the region, despite the presence of favourable preservation conditions. Rhynchocephalians remained diverse into the Late Jurassic, and were more abundant than lizards during the Late Jurassic in North America.

Rhynchocephalian diversity declined during the Early Cretaceous, disappearing from North America and Europe after the end of the epoch, and were absent from North Africa and northern South America by the early Late Cretaceous. The cause of the decline of Rhynchocephalia remains unclear, but has often been suggested to be due to competition with advanced lizards and mammals. They appear to have remained prevalent in southern South America during the Late Cretaceous, where lizards remained rare, with their remains outnumbering terrestrial lizards in this region by a factor of 200. Late Cretaceous South American sphenodontians are represented by both Eilenodontinae and Sphenodontidae (including Sphenodontinae). An indeterminate rhynchocephalian is known from a partial lower jaw of a hatchling from the latest Cretaceous or possibly earliest Paleocene Intertrappean Beds, in what was then the isolated landmass of Insular India, which appears to be an acrosphenodontian, possibly related to Godavarisaurus from the Jurassic of India. The youngest undoubted remains of rhynchocephalians outside of New Zealand are those of the sphenodontid Kawasphenodon peligrensis from the early Paleocene (Danian) of Patagonia approximately 64-63 million years ago, shortly after the Cretaceous–Paleogene extinction event. Indeterminate sphenodontine jaw fragments bearing teeth are known from the early Miocene (19–16 million years ago) St Bathans fauna, New Zealand, that are indistinguishable from those of the living tuatara. It is unlikely that the ancestors of the tuatara arrived in New Zealand via oceanic dispersal, and it is thought that they were already present in New Zealand when it separated from Antarctica between 80 and 66 million years ago.
