= Patagosphenos =

Patagosphenos Temporal range: Early Cretaceous (Albian), 106.2 Ma

Scientific classification
- Kingdom: Animalia
- Phylum: Chordata
- Class: Reptilia
- Order: Rhynchocephalia
- Suborder: Sphenodontia
- Subfamily: †Eilenodontinae
- Genus: †Patagosphenos; Gentil et al., 2019
- Species: †P. watuku

Binomial name
- †Patagosphenos watuku Gentil et al., 2019

Extinct genus of reptiles

Patagosphenos is an extinct genus of sphenodontian from the Early Cretaceous Huincul Formation of Argentina. It contains a single species, Patagosphenos watuku.
