= Ankylosphenodon =

Ankylosphenodon Temporal range: Early Cretaceous

Scientific classification
- Kingdom: Animalia
- Phylum: Chordata
- Class: Reptilia
- Order: Rhynchocephalia
- Family: Sphenodontidae
- Genus: †Ankylosphenodon; Reynoso, 2000

Species
- A. pachyostosus † Reynoso, 2000

Extinct genus of reptiles

Ankylosphenodon is an extinct genus of sphenodontian known from multiple specimens recovered from the Early Cretaceous deposits of the Tlayúa Formation, near Tepexi de Rodriguez, Mexico. It is likely part of a sphenodontid lineage that also includes Eilenodon and Toxolophosaurus, though has similarities to the sapheosaur clade. Its skeleton is pachyostotic (thickened) skeleton, believed to be an adaptation for a semi-aquatic lifestyle. Its teeth appear to have grown continuously, like in rodents.

== Taxonomy ==
=== Discovery and formal description ===
Ankylosphenodon is known from multiple specimens recovered from the Tlayúa Formation, a vertebrate-rich Lagerstätte near Tepexi de Rodriguez, in Central Mexico. The holotype (IGM 7441) is a partial skeleton, consisting of a skull, the left forelimb, and the front half of the presacral vertebral column. Another specimen, IGM 7443, preserves most of the right forelimb and the rear half of the body, minus the tail. All specimens were recovered from the Tlayúa Quarry, which, represents the Middle Member of the Tlayúa Formation, a Lagerstätte rich in vertebrate fossils. On collection, the specimens were transported to the Geological Institute of the National Autonomous University of Mexico. In 2000, Víctor-Hugo Reynoso formally described the genus. The generic name comes from Sphenodon, the generic name of the modern tuatara, and the Greek ἀγκύλος (ankylos), meaning "fused" or "bent", referring to the thickening of its ribs and vertebrae.

=== Classification ===
The strict consensus tree in Reynoso's paper on Ankylosphenodon recovers it as part of a small, unnamed clade within Sphenodontidae, one that also includes Eilenodon and Toxolophosaurus. Similarities with sapheosaurs were noted, though were ascribed to convergence. However, Sebastian Apesteguía, in 2005, suggested that it was in fact a sapheosaur.

== Description ==
Ankylosphenodon had an upper skull length of 8.25 cm (3.25 in). The length of the presacral vertebral column (the cervical and dorsal vertebrae), measured from the first to nineteenth vertebrae, is estimated at 28.26 cm (11.13 in).

=== Skull and mandible ===
The skull of Ankylosphenodon is poorly preserved. Assuming the skull and mandible were equal in length, the upper temporal fenestra extended for about half the skull's length. The premaxillae are separated, and are the only part of the snout that is preserved in the holotype. The mandible is typical among sphenodonts, though is unusually robust. It is slenderer at the front (anteriorly) than it is at the back (posteriorly). Little in the way of fine details are preserved, save for the dentary. The teeth are unique among sphenodonts, in that they extend deep into the dentary, as far as the Meckelian groove. This is convergent with the condition seen in rhynchosaurs. The teeth of Ankylosphenodon appear to have grown continuously, similar to some mammals, such as rodents.

=== Postcranial elements ===
Among sphenodonts, Ankylosphenodon is distinct in having pachyostotic (thickened) vertebrae and ribs, which were massive compared to those of related genera. Its overall morphology is reflective of semi-aquatic reptiles, such as crocodiles and marine iguanas, suggesting that it may have adopted a similar lifestyle and swam similarly to the latter. Like the axial skeletons, the limbs were massive and heavily constructed. The hind limbs were longer than the forelimbs. The fifth pedal digit was smaller and slenderer than the others. Ankylosphenodon's tail was well-adapted to lateral motion, though resisted dorsoventral (up-and-down) motion.

== Palaeoenvironment ==
The palaeoenvironment of the Tlayúa Formation, from which all specimens of Ankylosphenodon are known, was likely a shallow coastal lagoon. It may have formed part of an island, though a connection to the North American mainland cannot be ruled out. A certain degree of influence from freshwater environments is indicated by the presence of fossils from crocodilians and freshwater turtles.
