= Lanceirosphenodon =

Lanceirosphenodon Temporal range: Late Triassic, Norian

Scientific classification
- Kingdom: Animalia
- Phylum: Chordata
- Class: Reptilia
- Order: Rhynchocephalia
- Infraorder: Eusphenodontia
- Genus: †Lanceirosphenodon; Vivar et al., 2021

Type species
- †Lanceirosphenodon ferigoloi Vivar et al., 2021

Extinct genus of reptiles

Lanceirosphenodon is an extinct genus of sphenodontian from the Late Triassic Candelária Formation of Brazil. It contains a single species, Lanceirosphenodon ferigoloi.
