= Penegephyrosaurus =

Penegephyrosaurus Temporal range: Late Triassic, Rhaetian

Scientific classification
- Kingdom: Animalia
- Phylum: Chordata
- Class: Reptilia
- Order: Rhynchocephalia
- Family: †Gephyrosauridae
- Genus: †Penegephyrosaurus; Whiteside & Duffin, 2017

Type species
- †Penegephyrosaurus curtiscoppi Whiteside & Duffin, 2017

Extinct genus of reptiles

Penegephyrosaurus is an extinct genus of early rhynchocephalian from the Late Triassic of the United Kingdom. It contains a single species, Penegephyrosaurus curtiscoppi. It is only known from a partial lower jaw. It is considered one of the most basal known rhynchocephalians and is placed as part of the family Gephyrosauridae.
