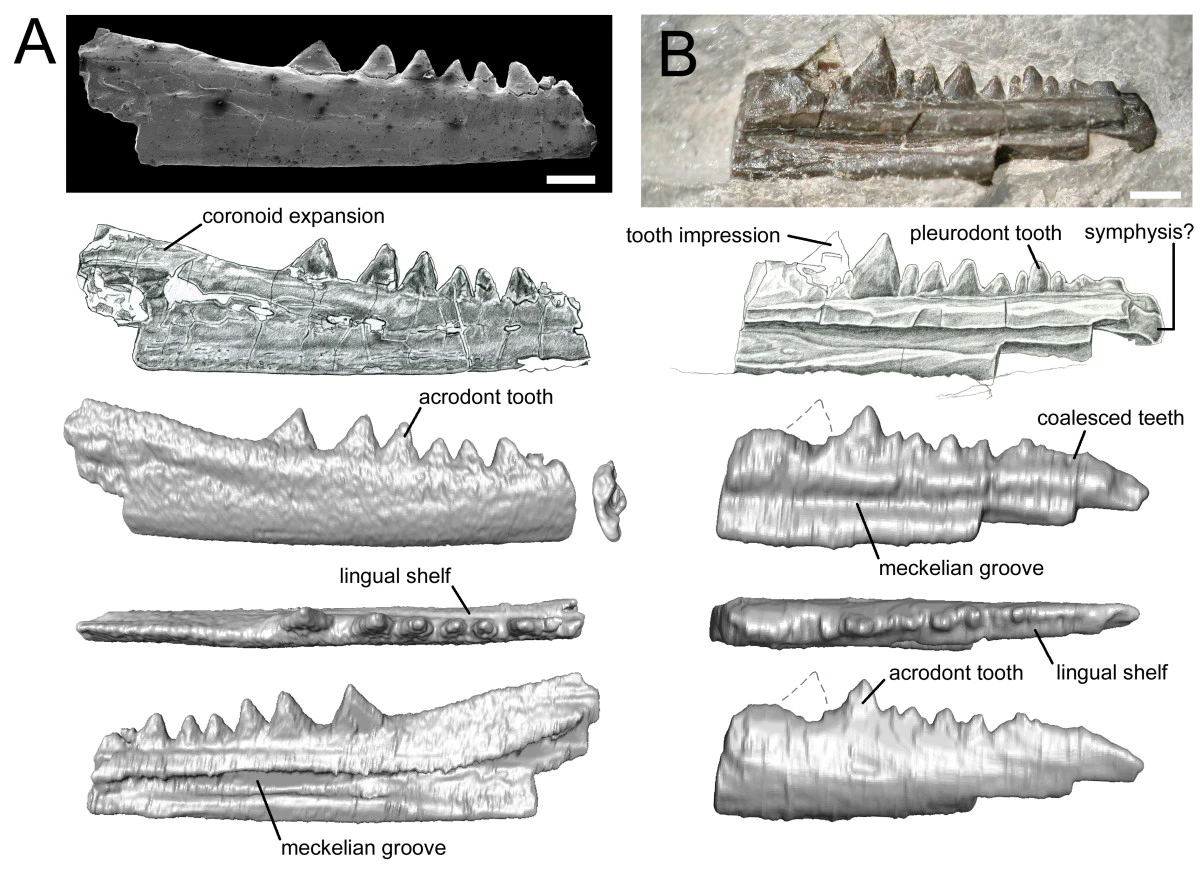
- Lower jaw of Wirtembergia

Scientific classification
- Kingdom: Animalia
- Phylum: Chordata
- Class: Reptilia
- Order: Rhynchocephalia
- Genus: †Wirtembergia; Sues and Schoch, 2023

Type species
- Wirtembergia hauboldae Sues and Schoch, 2023

= Wirtembergia =

Wirtembergia Temporal range: Middle Triassic (Ladinian) 238 Ma

Extinct genus of reptiles

Wirtembergia is an extinct genus of rhynchocephalian reptile known from the Middle Triassic (Ladinian) of Germany. It currently the most primitive known rhynchocephalian, and also one of the oldest known rhynchocephalians, after Agriodontosaurus.

== History of discovery ==
The first remains of the genus were reported in 2013 as cf. Diphydontosaurus based on two lower jaws found in the Middle Triassic (Ladinian) Erfurt Formation, located in the state of Baden-Württemberg near the settlement of Vellberg. In 2023, the genus and species Wirtembergia hauboldae was described based on this material, as well as a partial skeleton (SMNS 91313) found at the same locality, including parts of the skull (the premaxilla, maxilla, jugal, frontal, pterygoid, and a possible partial palatine) as well as limb bones and ribs.

== Description ==
The skull when complete is estimated to have been around 2–2.5 centimetres (0.79–0.98 in) long, with an estimated total body length of around 20–25 centimetres (7.9–9.8 in). The jaws have a combination of slightly backward curving (recurved) column-like pleurodont front teeth attached to the inner side of the jaw along with larger posterior triangular acrodont teeth attached to the apex of the jaw bone, similar to other primitive rhynchocephalians like Diphydontosaurus. These teeth underwent replacement. The frontal bones of the skull were not fused to each other, unlike other known rhynchocephalians, though this may have been present in more ontogenically mature individuals.

== Phylogeny ==
Wirtembergia has been placed as the most basal rhynchocephalian:

- - Rhynchocephalia
    - Wirtembergia hauboldae
    - - Gephyrosaurus bridensis
      - Sphenodontia
        - Diphydontosaurus avonis
        - Acrosphenodontia
          - Planocephalosaurus robinsonae
          - - Rebbanasaurus jaini
            - - - Godavarisaurus lateefi
                - Theretairus antiquus
              - Eusphenodontia
                - Polysphenodon mulleri
                - - Opisthiamimus gregori
                  - - Clevosauridae
                      - - Clevosaurus convallis
                        - - Clevosaurus brasiliensis
                          - Clevosaurus hadroprodon
                      - - Clevosaurus bairdi
                        - - Clevosaurus hudsoni
                          - Clevosaurus cambrica
                    - Neosphenodontia
