= Godavarisaurus =

Godavarisaurus Temporal range: Early Jurassic

Scientific classification
- Kingdom: Animalia
- Phylum: Chordata
- Order: Rhynchocephalia
- Genus: †Godavarisaurus; Evans, Prasad & Manhas, 2001
- Species: †G. lateefi

Binomial name
- †Godavarisaurus lateefi Evans, Prasad & Manhas, 2001

Extinct genus of reptiles

Godavarisaurus is an extinct genus of sphenodontian reptile from the Early-Middle Jurassic Kota Formation of Andhra Pradesh, India. It is known from jaw fragments (including the maxilla, premaxilla, and parts of the dentary). It was a small sphenodontian, with the skull estimated to be less than 2 centimetres (0.79 in) long. It is generally considered to be a relatively basal sphenodontian that lies outside Eusphenodontia.

Cladogram following Sues and Schoch, 2023:

- - Rhynchocephalia
    - Wirtembergia hauboldae
    - - Gephyrosaurus bridensis
      - Sphenodontia
        - Diphydontosaurus avonis
        - Acrosphenodontia
          - Planocephalosaurus robinsonae
          - - Rebbanasaurus jaini
            - - - Godavarisaurus lateefi
                - Theretairus antiquus
              - Eusphenodontia
                - Polysphenodon mulleri
                - - Opisthiamimus gregori
                  - - Clevosauridae
                      - - Clevosaurus convallis
                        - - Clevosaurus brasiliensis
                          - Clevosaurus hadroprodon
                      - - Clevosaurus bairdi
                        - - Clevosaurus hudsoni
                          - Clevosaurus cambrica
                    - Neosphenodontia

== See also ==
- Rhynchocephalia
