= Rebbanasaurus =

Rebbanasaurus Temporal range: Jurassic

Scientific classification
- Kingdom: Animalia
- Phylum: Chordata
- Class: Reptilia
- Order: Rhynchocephalia
- Suborder: Sphenodontia
- Genus: †Rebbanasaurus; Evans, Prasad & Manhas, 2001
- Species: †R. jaini

Binomial name
- †Rebbanasaurus jaini Evans, Prasad & Manhas

Extinct genus of reptiles

Rebbanasaurus is an extinct sphenodontian reptile known from remains found in the Early-Middle Jurassic Kota Formation of India. The type specimen is a partial jawbone which has acrodont teeth, with other known remains including fragments of the premaxilla, maxilla, and palatine. It was relatively small, with a skull estimated at 1.5–2.5 centimetres (0.59–0.98 in) long. It is generally considered to be a relatively basal sphenodontian that lies outside Eusphenodontia.

Cladogram following Sues and Schoch, 2023:

- - Rhynchocephalia
    - Wirtembergia hauboldae
    - - Gephyrosaurus bridensis
      - Sphenodontia
        - Diphydontosaurus avonis
        - Acrosphenodontia
          - Planocephalosaurus robinsonae
          - - Rebbanasaurus jaini
            - - - Godavarisaurus lateefi
                - Theretairus antiquus
              - Eusphenodontia
                - Polysphenodon mulleri
                - - Opisthiamimus gregori
                  - - Clevosauridae
                      - - Clevosaurus convallis
                        - - Clevosaurus brasiliensis
                          - Clevosaurus hadroprodon
                      - - Clevosaurus bairdi
                        - - Clevosaurus hudsoni
                          - Clevosaurus cambrica
                    - Neosphenodontia
