= Kaikaifilusaurus =

Kaikaifilusaurus Temporal range: Albian ~111–106 Ma

Scientific classification
- Kingdom: Animalia
- Phylum: Chordata
- Order: Rhynchocephalia
- Subfamily: †Eilenodontinae
- Genus: †Kaikaifilusaurus; Simón & Kellner 2003

Type species
- Kaikaifilusaurus calvoi Simón & Kellner 2003

Species
- K. calvoi Simón & Kellner 2003; ?K. minimus (Apesteguía & Carballido 2014)

Synonyms
- ?Priosphenodon Apesteguia & Novas 2003

Extinct genus of reptiles

Kaikaifilusaurus is an extinct genus of rhynchocephalians in the family Sphenodontidae from the Early Cretaceous (Albian stage) of South America. Fossils of the genus were found in the Candeleros Formation, Huincul Formation, and Cerro Barcino Formation in Patagonia, Argentina. The genus contains two species, K. minimus and the type species K. calvoi.

== Etymology ==
The genus name Kaikaifilusaurus is derived from the Greek sauros, meaning "lizard" and Kaikaifilu, coming from Mapudungun, the language of the Mapuche. In their cosmology, Kai-Kai filú is the almighty giant reptile owner of the seas, a rival of Treng-Treng filú, "both creators of the lands through their continuous fight that causes the earthquakes, volcanoes, tsunamis and all the events that molded the earth where we live". The same etymology has been used for the mosasaur genus Kaikaifilu from the López de Bertodano Formation of Antarctica.

== Classification ==
The present type species of Kaikaifilusaurus, K. calvoi, was described by Simón and Kellner in 2003, based on type specimen MPCHv 4, a mandible (left lower jaw) from the Candeleros Formation. In the same year, Priosphenodon avelasi was described by Apesteguía and Novas in 2003, based on type specimen MPCA 300, a partially articulated adult skeleton from the fluvial sandstones of the Candeleros Formation in the Neuquén Basin.

Gentil et al. in 2019 reassigned P. avelasi as a junior synonym of Kaikaifilusaurus calvoi. Gentil et al. placed the second species of Priosphenodon, P. minimus, in 2014 described by Apesteguía and Carballido based on the type specimen MPEF-PV 3166, a skull (almost complete skull with attached jaws, from the Albian Cerro Barcino Formation of the Cañadón Asfalto Basin, in the same genus of Kaikaifilusaurus as K. minimus. Apesteguía and Carballido had considered Kaikaifilusaurus a nomen dubium.

The 2019 researchers described another specimen of Kaikaifilusaurus; MPCA-PV 808, an incomplete right dentary from the Turonian strata of the Huincul Formation of the Neuquén Basin.

Gentil et al. (2019) place the genus Kaikaifilusaurus in the subfamily Eilenodontinae of the order Sphenodontia.

== Description ==
The fossil of Kaikaifilusaurus sp. described by Gentil et al. in 2019 comprises a fragment of 14.6 millimetres (0.57 in) long preserving nine teeth, presenting an acrodont implantation and a nearly straight anteroposterior linear arrangement.

Adult specimens of Kaikaifilusaurus are estimated to reach 1 metre (3.3 ft) in length, larger than previously known terrestrial sphenodontian.

== Paleoecology ==
The fossil record of Kaikaifilusaurus is primarily known from the Albian age of the Early Cretaceous. The oldest record (the K. minimus type locality) of the genus comes from the La Paloma Member of the Cerro Barcino Formation of the Cañadón Asfalto Basin in north-central Patagonia, Argentina. During this time, the paleoclimate of the La Paloma Member of the formation was arid, and the depositional environment comprised a playa lake with debris flows system, dominated by pyroclastic deposits with intercalated dune sediments. The same member has provided fossils of Chubutemys copelloi and an indeterminate theropod.

The type species K. calvoi is known from the Candeleros Formation. Originally suggested to be the Cenomanian age of the Late Cretaceous, the maximum depositional age of both the Candeleros Formation and the overlying Huincul Formation is re-dated to the early Albian by Maniel and colleagues in 2026, approximately 111.4 ± 1.1 Ma and 106.2 ± 1.0 Ma, respectively. The formation comprises eolian and paleosol deposits, as well as sediments deposits in a braided river environment. Fossils of one of the largest theropods known, Giganotosaurus carolinii were found in this succession, as well as frogs, mammals and fish.

The youngest record of the genus occurs in the Huincul Formation, overlying the Candeleros Formation in Neuquén Basin. The formation represents an arid environment with ephemeral or seasonal streams. The same locality where Kaikaifilusaurus was found, has provided abundant fossils of lepisosteid fish, chelid turtles, lizards, neosuchian crocodyliforms, ornithopods, titanosaurian sauropods and diverse theropods including abelisaurids, carcharodontosaurids, and megaraptorans. The dinosaurs Gualicho shinyae, Argentinosaurus huinculensis, Mapusaurus rosae, Cathartesaura, Ilokelesia, and Skorpiovenator bustingorryi, come from this formation.

== See also ==
- Lamarquesaurus
