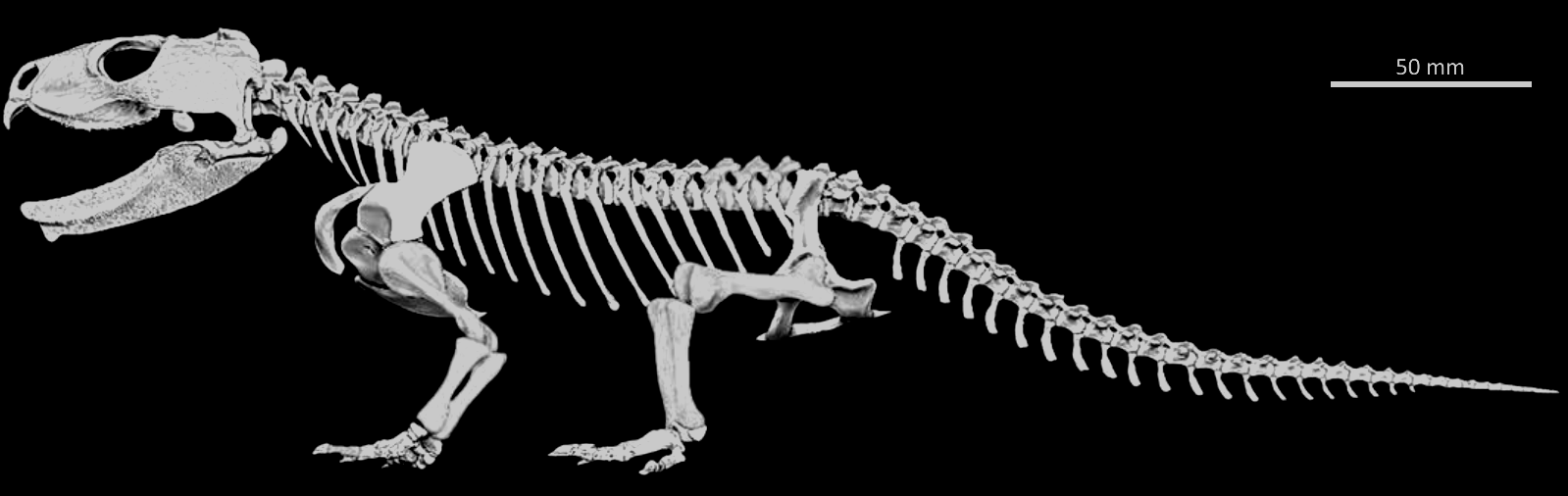
- Reconstructed skeleton of P. avelasi

Scientific classification
- Kingdom: Animalia
- Phylum: Chordata
- Order: Rhynchocephalia
- Subfamily: †Eilenodontinae
- Genus: †Priosphenodon; Apesteguia & Novas 2003

Species
- †P. avelasi Apestiguia & Novas 2003; †P. minimus Apestiguia & Carballido 2014

= Priosphenodon =

Priosphenodon Temporal range: Albian

Extinct genus of reptiles

Priosphenodon is an extinct, large herbivorous eilenodontine rhynchocephalian known from the Early Cretaceous (Albian) of Argentina. It is one of the largest known sphenodontians.

== Taxonomy ==
The type species of Priosphenodon, P. avelasi, was described in 2003 from the Candeleros Formation of Argentina. Originally suggested to be the Cenomanian age of the Late Cretaceous, the maximum depositional age of both the Candeleros Formation and the overlying Huincul Formation is re-dated to the early Albian by Maniel et al. (2026), approximately 111.4 ± 1.1 Ma and 106.2 ± 1.0 Ma respectively. In 2014, a second smaller species, P. minimus was described from the same formation. Other authors have disputed the use of the genus Priosphenodon, with some authors treating P. avelasi and P. minimus as members of the previously named genus Kaikaifilusaurus instead.

== Description ==
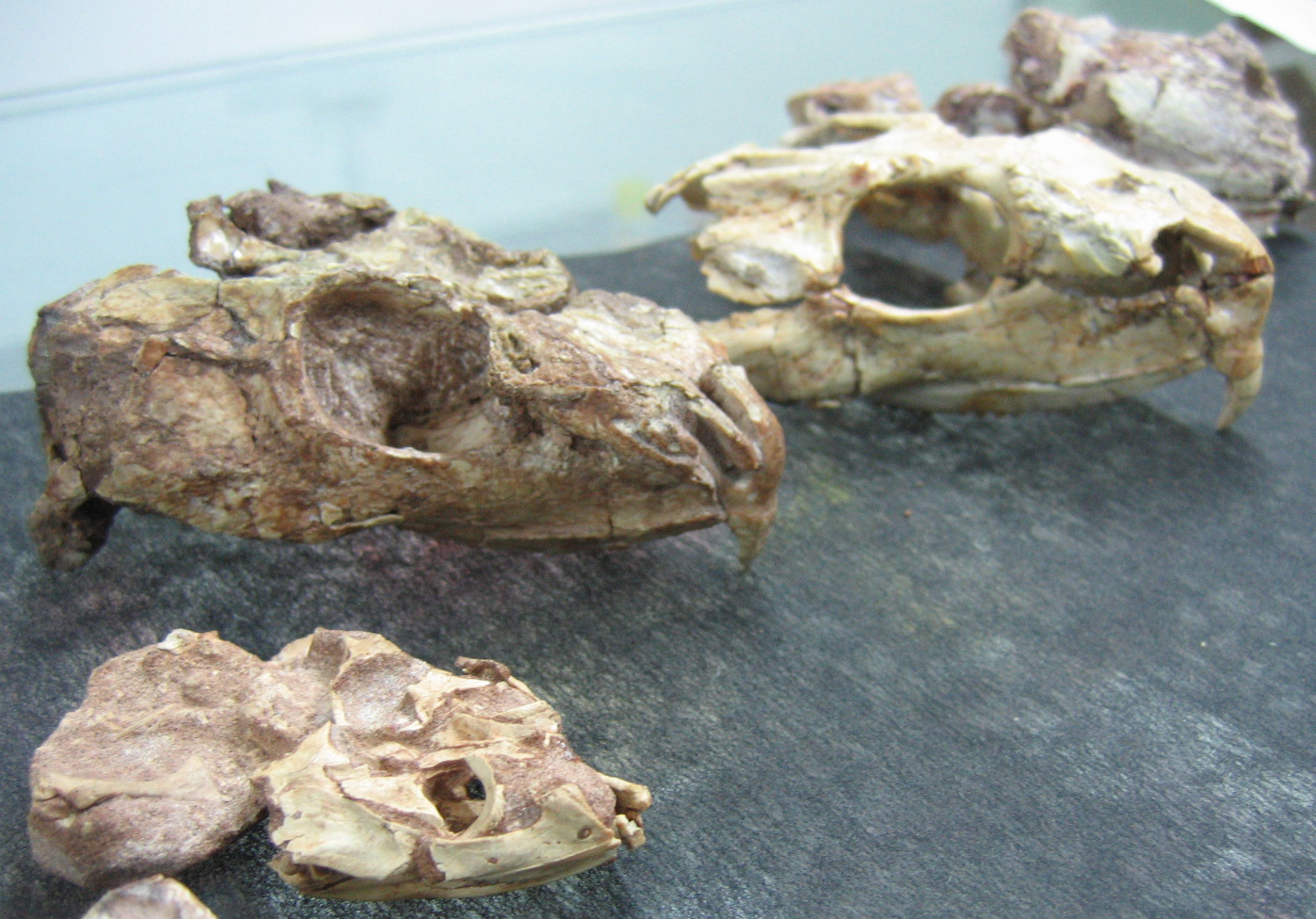
Skulls of P. avelasi corresponding to different ontogenetic stages

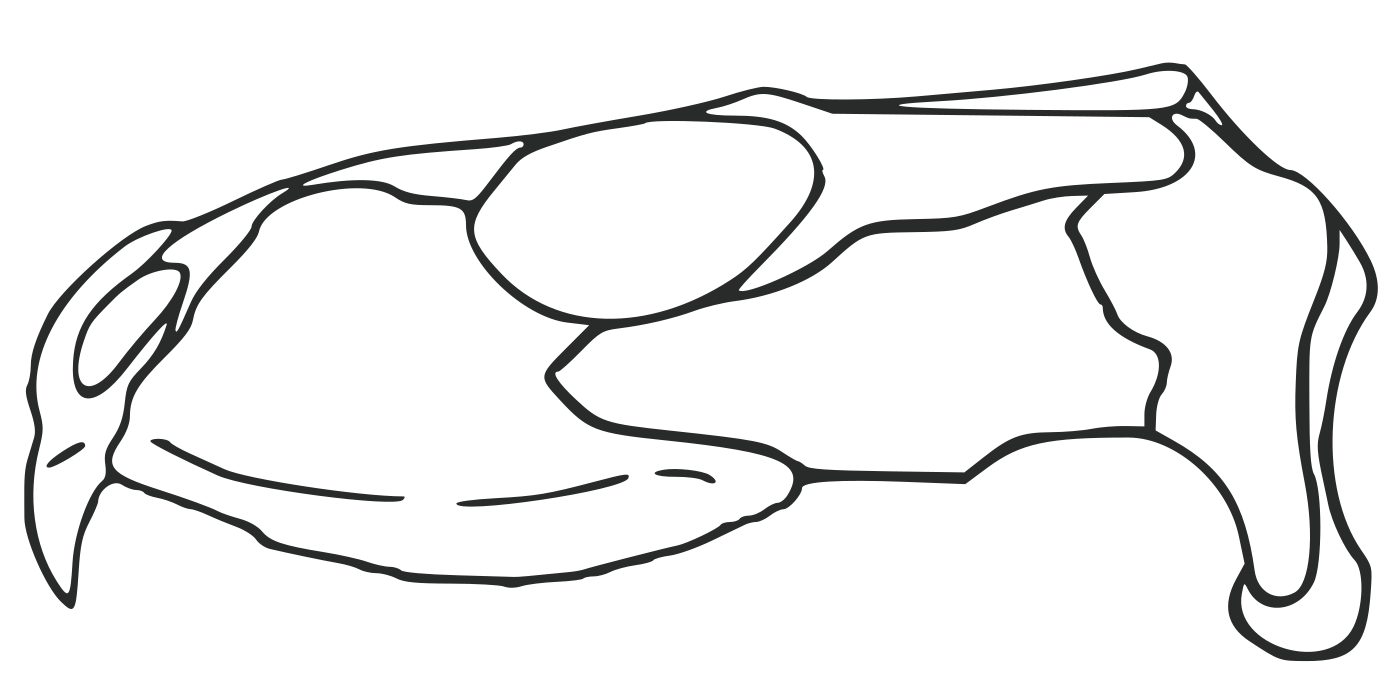
Illustration of the skull of P. avelasi in lateral view

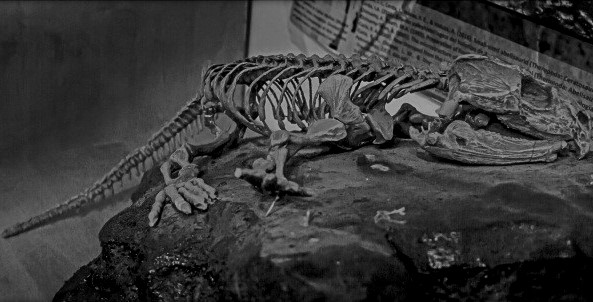
Skeleton

With some individuals reaching over 1 metre (3.3 ft) in total length, Priosphenodon avelasi is the largest known terrestrial sphenodontian. The skull is around 15 centimetres (5.9 in) long. The front of the upper jaw has a large beak-like structure, unlike the beak of the living tuatara, which is formed from fused teeth, the beak of Priosphenodon is entirely composed of bone, similar to those of the unrelated (but also herbivorous) rhynchosaurs, unlike rhynchosaurs however, it has been suggested that Priosphenodon lacked a cornified rhamphotheca due to the smoothness of the bone surface. The teeth are densely packed with a cone-in-cone structure, and have prismatic enamel structure similar to those of mammals and the lizard Uromastyx, which was likely an adaptation to wear resistance in the absence of tooth replacement. There is a large elongate tooth row on the palatine bones on the roof of the mouth that runs parallel to the maxillary tooth row. The ungual phalanges are square in shape, and are expanded towards their distal ends, a condition unlike those known in other lepidosaurs, which typically have pointed ungual phalanges.

Priosphenodon avelasi exhibited variable but generally slow growth rates, with a probably sexually mature individual confirmed to be at least 13 years old by bone histology was still growing and only around 40% maximum size at the time of death.

Priosphenodon minimus differs from P. avelasi by having a proportionally shorter skull in addition to a considerably smaller body size, among a variety of differences in the arrangement and shape of the skull bones.

== Ecology ==
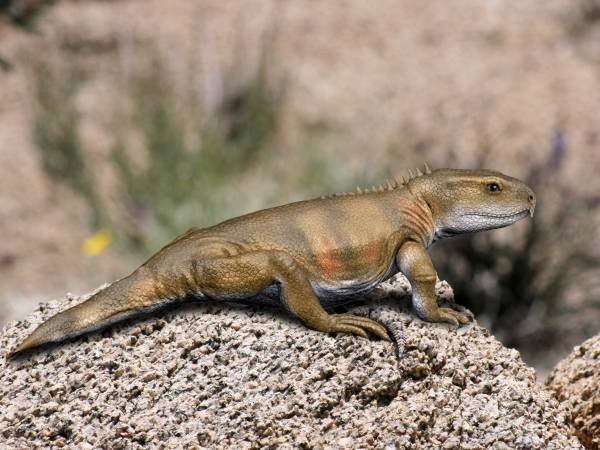
Life restoration of P. avelasi

During feeding the dentary teeth of Priosphenodon slotted between the maxillary and palatine tooth rows, which in turn with backward and forward (propalinal) motion of the jaw, served to shred plant material. The Candeleros Formation is suggested to have been deposited in an arid environment. Remains of P. avelasi are the most abundant of any terrestrial vertebrate at the sites it is found, and the lack of other herbivores found at the localities suggests that it may have been the only resident herbivore.
