= Leptosaurus =

Leptosaurus Temporal range: Late Jurassic, Tithonian

Scientific classification
- Kingdom: Animalia
- Phylum: Chordata
- Class: Reptilia
- Order: Rhynchocephalia
- Suborder: Sphenodontia
- Genus: †Leptosaurus; Fitzinger, 1837
- Species: †L. neptunius

Binomial name
- †Leptosaurus neptunius (Goldfuss, 1831)

Genus of reptiles

Leptosaurus is a genus of sphenodontian from the Late Jurassic of Bavaria, southern Germany.

Kallimodon, at times synonymized with Leptosaurus, is actually a distinct genus more closely related to Sapheosaurus.
