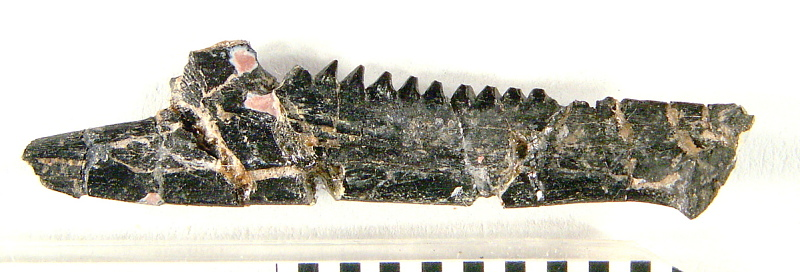
- Jaw of Opisthias rarus

Scientific classification
- Kingdom: Animalia
- Phylum: Chordata
- Class: Reptilia
- Order: Rhynchocephalia
- Suborder: Sphenodontia
- Infraorder: Eusphenodontia
- Clade: Neosphenodontia
- Clade: †Opisthodontia
- Genus: †Opisthias; Gilmore 1909

Type species
- Opisthias rarus Gilmore, 1905

= Opisthias =

Opisthias Temporal range: Kimmeridgian–Tithonian Possible Berriasian record

Extinct genus of reptiles

Opisthias is a genus of sphenodont reptile. The type species, Opisthias rarus, is known from the Late Jurassic (Kimmeridgian-Tithonian) of western North America.

== Distribution ==
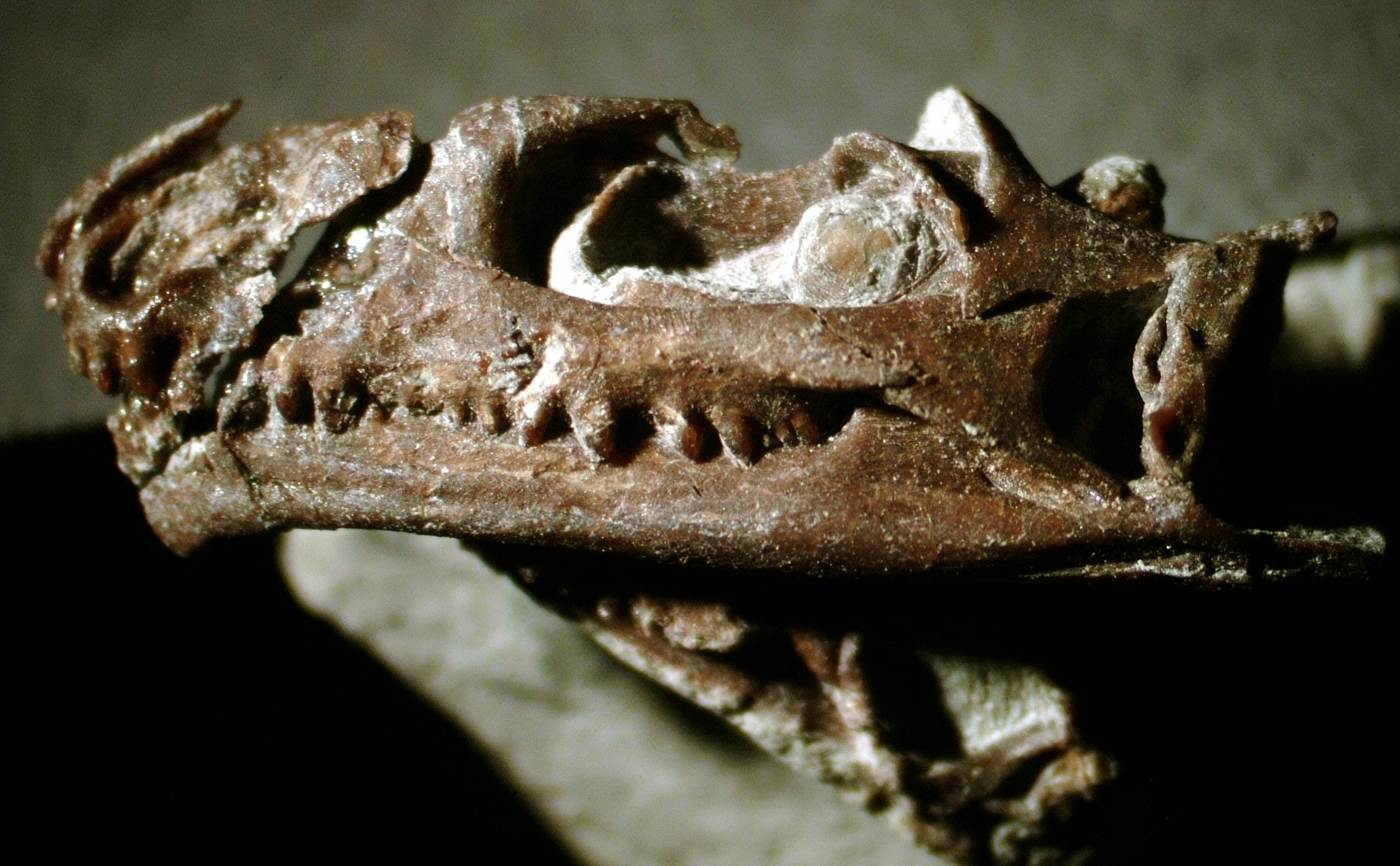
A rhynchocephalian skull (DINO 16454) which has been attributed to Opisthias by some sources, but this has been disputed

Opisthias is primarily known from remains found in the Late Jurassic of the United States, with remains found in the Morrison Formation (Colorado, Utah, and Wyoming), present in stratigraphic zones 2 and 4–6. Other remains suggested to be closely related to Opisthias are also known from the Late Jurassic Alcobaça Formation of Portugal. An undescribed crushed skull (DINO 16454) from the Morrison Formation has been attributed to this genus by some sources, though this has been strongly disputed by others.

A lower jaw is also known from the Berriasian aged Lulworth Formation of the United Kingdom, which appears to be distinct from the type North American species. A fragmentary dentary possibly attributable to Opisthias is also known from the Berriasian aged Angeac-Charente bonebed in France.

== Diet ==
Opisthias has been interpreted as a generalist, with its tooth morphology indicating had an ability to process plant material.

== See also ==
- Prehistoric reptile
- Paleobiota of the Morrison Formation
