= Planocephalosaurus =

Planocephalosaurus Temporal range: Late Triassic
- Skull diagram of Planocephalosaurus robinsonae

Scientific classification
- Kingdom: Animalia
- Phylum: Chordata
- Class: Reptilia
- Order: Rhynchocephalia
- Suborder: Sphenodontia
- Genus: †Planocephalosaurus; Fraser, 1982

Species
- P. robinsonae † Fraser, 1982; P. lucasi † Heckert, 2004

Extinct genus of reptiles

Planocephalosaurus is an extinct genus of basal rhynchocephalian. Fossils of the genus are primarily known from fissure fill deposits from the Late Triassic of southwest Britain, with fragmentary remains possibly belonging to the genus also known from the Late Triassic of Texas.

== Taxonomy ==
The genus and the type species P. robinsonae was described in 1982 by Fraser from remains found in fissure fill deposits in Gloucestershire in southwest Britain. In 2004, a second species P. lucasi was described from remains found in the Tecovas Formation in Texas. P. robinsonae is known from disarticulated remains covering most of the skeleton,, while P. lucasi is known from fragments of the jaws. While originally classified in Sphenodontidae, later studies have placed it as a basal sphenodontian, more derived than Diphydontosaurus but more basal than Clevosaurus.

Cladogram after:

- - Rhynchocephalia
    - Wirtembergia hauboldae
    - - Gephyrosaurus bridensis
      - Sphenodontia
        - Diphydontosaurus avonis
        - Acrosphenodontia
          - Planocephalosaurus robinsonae
          - - Rebbanasaurus jaini
            - - - Godavarisaurus lateefi
                - Theretairus antiquus
              - Eusphenodontia
                - Polysphenodon mulleri
                - - Opisthiamimus gregori
                  - - Clevosauridae
                      - - Clevosaurus convallis
                        - - Clevosaurus brasiliensis
                          - Clevosaurus hadroprodon
                      - - Clevosaurus bairdi
                        - - Clevosaurus hudsoni
                          - Clevosaurus cambrica
                    - Neosphenodontia

== Description ==
Life restoration of Planocephalosaurus robinsonae

Planocephalosaurus robinsonae was a small sphenodontian, with a skull length of around 2 centimetres (0.79 in), with a total length of around 14.5–16 centimetres (5.7–6.3 in). Unlike the modern tuatara, the skull is thought to lack a complete lower temporal bar connecting the jugal and the quadrate, though a complete temporal bar may have been variably present in some adult individuals. While initially suggested to have had fully acrodont dentition, later X-ray analysis suggested that the teeth at the front of the jaws of Planocephalosaurus were attached to a shelf on the inward side of the jaw, technically making them pleurodont, though they had some characters typically associated with acrodonty, such as having no clear boundary between the teeth and jaw bone. The back of the jaws had enlarged fully acrodont teeth fused to the apex of the jaw bone, similar to Diphydontosaurus.

== Ecology ==
Planocephalosaurus is thought to have been insectivorous, with it possibly also feeding on small vertebrates.
