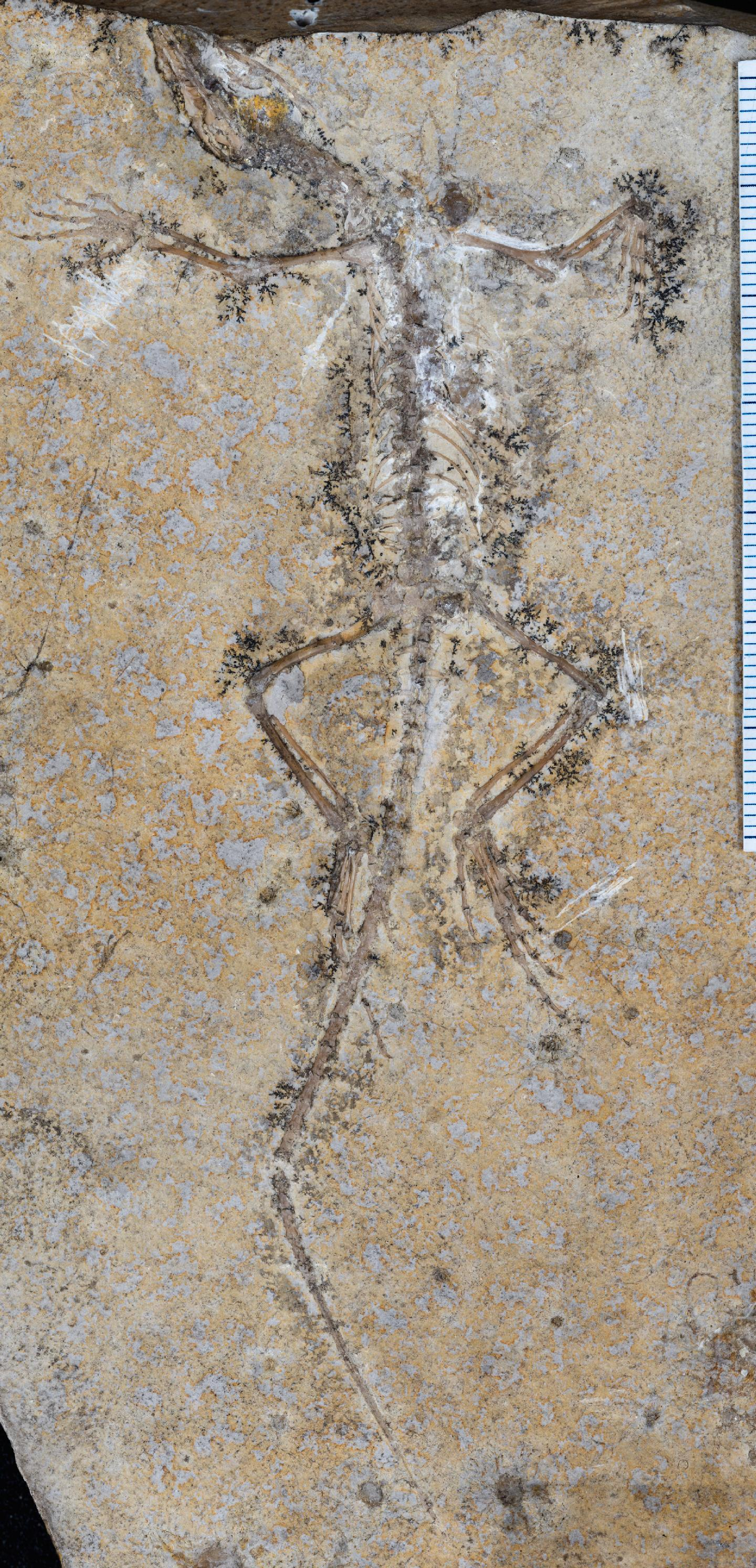
- Photo of the holotype counterslab (NHMUK PV R 2741)

Scientific classification
- Kingdom: Animalia
- Phylum: Chordata
- Class: Reptilia
- Order: Rhynchocephalia
- Suborder: Sphenodontia
- Infraorder: Eusphenodontia
- Clade: Neosphenodontia
- Genus: †Sphenodraco; Beccari et al., 2025
- Species: †S. scandentis

Binomial name
- †Sphenodraco scandentis Beccari et al., 2025

= Sphenodraco =

Sphenodraco Temporal range: Late Jurassic, early Tithonian

Genus of extinct reptiles

External image
- Life restoration by Gabriel Ugueto: Sphenodraco in the Solnhofen palaeoenvironment.

Sphenodraco (meaning "sphenodontian dragon") is an extinct genus of neosphenodontian reptiles known from the Late Jurassic (Tithonian age) Altmühltal Formation, part of the Solnhofen Archipelago in Germany. The genus contains a single species, Sphenodraco scandentis, known from a nearly complete skeleton preserved on a slab and counterslab. The elongated proportions of its limbs are similar to those of living arboreal lizards. As such, Sphenodraco may be the first known fully tree-dwelling rhynchocephalian.

== Discovery and naming ==
Sphenodraco is known from a single articulated, nearly complete specimen preserved in ventral view (seen from the bottom) on two separate slabs (a part and counterpart). It was discovered in outcrops of the Altmühltal Formation (likely the Upper Eichstätt Member) near Eichstätt, Germany. Surprisingly—and for unknown reasons—these two slabs are housed separately in different institutions. The main slab, accessioned at the Naturmuseum Senckenberg in Germany as specimen SMF R414, comprises a natural mold of the skeleton with some of the bone. It was first figured in 1931 and later reported in 1963 as belonging to the species Homoeosaurus maximiliani. The counterslab, housed at the Natural History Museum in London, England, as specimen NHMUK PV R 2741, contains most of the skeletal material. This part of the specimen had not been previously reported or described. In 2022, the counterslab was 'rediscovered' and identified as belonging to the same individual as SMF R414.

In a 2025 publication, Victor Beccari and colleagues recognized several anatomical characters distinguishing these specimens from Homoeosaurus. As such, they described Sphenodraco scandentis as a new genus and species of rhynchocephalians based on these fossil remains. The generic name, Sphenodraco, combines the prefix spheno-—derived from the Ancient Greek σφήν (sphḗn), meaning "wedge"—with the Latin word draco, meaning "dragon". The name references both the Sphenodontia—the clade to which it belongs—and the gliding abilities of the arboreal lizards to which its limb proportions are comparable. The specific name, scandentis, derived from scandens, a Latin word meaning "climber".

== Classification ==
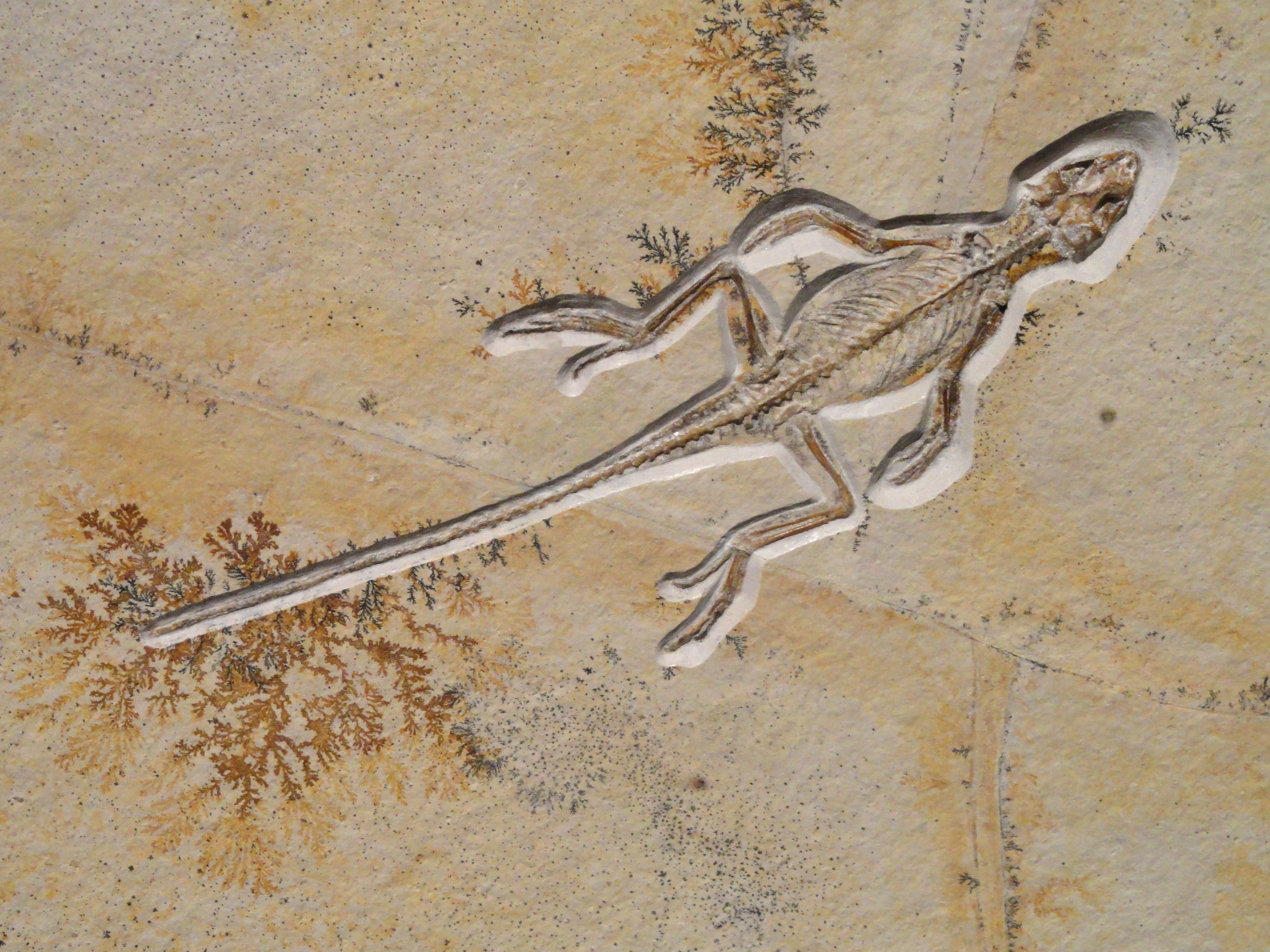
Fossil of Homoeosaurus maximilliani, a closely related species that Sphenodraco was once thought to belong to

In their phylogenetic analyses (most parsimonious tree, implied weighting), Beccari and colleagues (2025) recovered Sphenodraco as a member of the rhynchocephalian clade Neosphenodontia, as the sister taxon to Kallimodon spp. in a clade also including Homoeosaurus spp. These results are displayed in the simplified cladogram below:

- Rhynchocephalia
  - †Gephyrosaurus
  - Sphenodontia
    - †Diphydontosaurus
    - - †Planocephalosaurus
      - Eusphenodontia
        - †Clevosaurus (paraphyletic)
        - Neosphenodontia
          - Sphenodontidae
            - †Eilenodontinae
              - †Priosphenodon
              - †Sphenotitan
            - Sphenodontinae
              - †Opisthiamimus
              - - †Navajosphenodon
                - - †Sphenofontis
                  - Sphenodon (tuatara)
          - - †Homoeosaurus solnhofensis
            - - - - †Homoeosaurus maximiliani
                  - †Homoeosaurus parvipes
                - - †Sphenodraco
                  - †Kallimodon
              - - †Pleurosauridae
                  - †Derasmosaurus
                  - - †Ankylosphenodon
                    - - †Palaeopleurosaurus
                      - - †Acrosaurus
                        - †Pleurosaurus
                - - †Vadasaurus
                  - †Sapheosauridae
                    - †Sapheosaurus
                    - - †Piocormus
                      - †Oenosaurus

In a 2026 description of the axial skeleton of the modern tuatara (Sphenodon punctatus), Beccari and colleagues incorporated 16 new phylogenetic characters into their previous dataset based on their observations of this anatomical region. As in their 2025 analysis, Sphenodraco was recovered in a clade also containing Kallimodon and Homoeosaurus, in addition to SNSB-BSPG 1993 XVIII 3, an unnamed specimen from the Brunn locality of the Solnhofen Archipelago.

== See also ==
- 2025 in reptile paleontology
- Paleobiota of the Solnhofen Limestone
