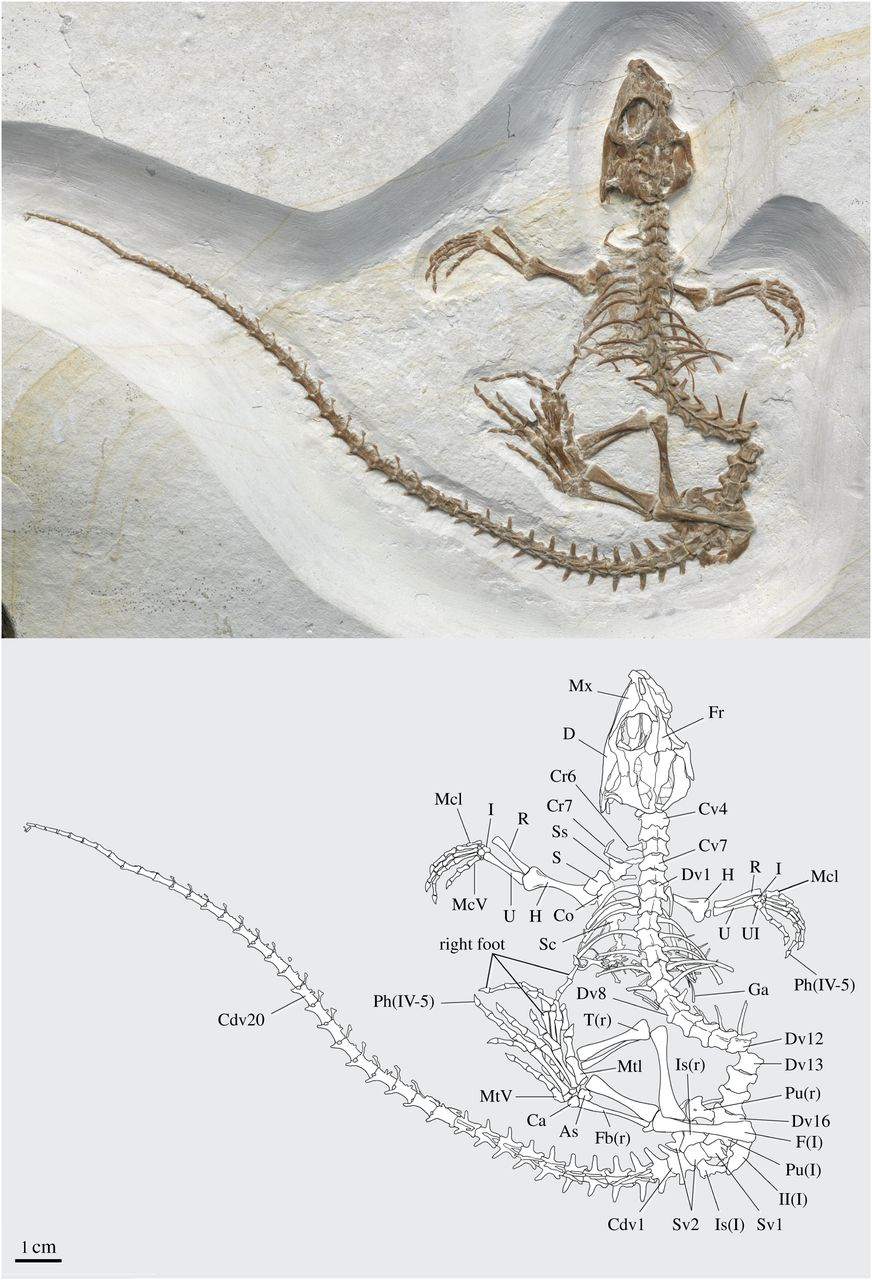
- The holotype fossil of Vadasaurus herzogi

Scientific classification
- Kingdom: Animalia
- Phylum: Chordata
- Class: Reptilia
- Order: Rhynchocephalia
- Suborder: Sphenodontia
- Genus: †Vadasaurus

Type species
- Vadasaurus herzogi Bever & Norell, 2017

= Vadasaurus =

Vadasaurus Temporal range: Late Jurassic, Kimmeridgian

Extinct genus of reptiles

Vadasaurus is an extinct genus of rhynchocephalian closely related to the aquatic pleurosaurids. Although this genus was not as specialized as the eel-like pleurosaurs for aquatic life, various skeletal features support the idea that it had a semiaquatic lifestyle. The type species, Vadasaurus herzogi, was described and named in 2017. It was discovered in the Solnhofen Limestone in Germany, which is dated to the Late Jurassic. The generic name "Vadasaurus" is derived from "vadare", which is Latin for "to go" or "to walk forth", and "saurus", which means "lizard" (although rhynchocephalians are not lizards). "Vadare" is the root of the English word "wade", which is the reason it was chosen for this genus, in reference to its perceived semiaquatic habits. The specific name, "herzogi", refers to Werner Herzog, a Bavarian filmmaker.

== Description ==
The holotype of Vadasaurus herzogi is AMNH FARB 32768, a well-preserved but slightly flattened skeleton which is practically complete.

=== Skull and teeth ===
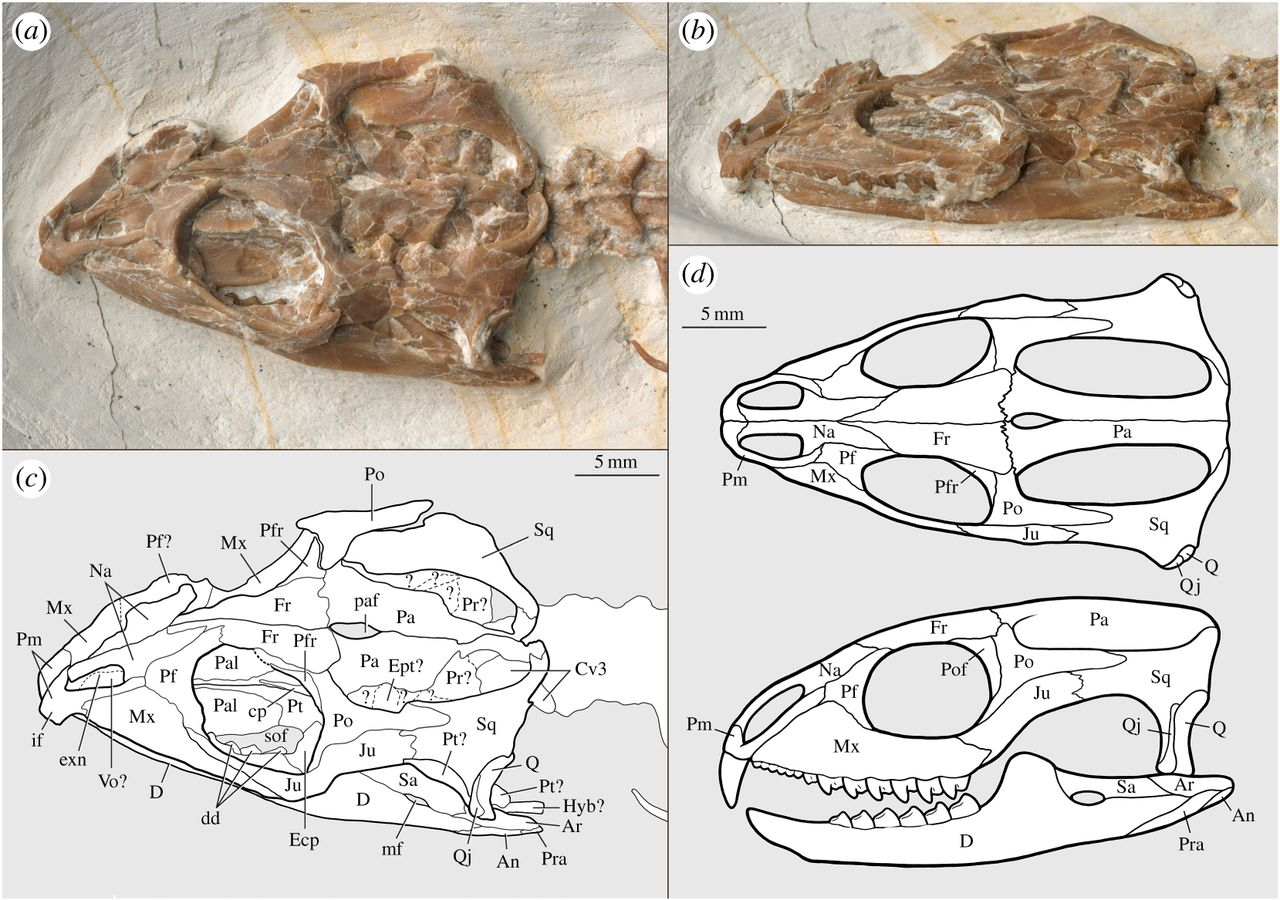
The skull of the Vadasaurus specimen.

The part of the skull in front of the eyes is rather short, but the rear part is long, with elongated temporal fenestrae (holes in the back of the skull). As a whole the skull is triangular in shape. The lower temporal fenestrae, on the sides of the skull, are very large, about a quarter the length of the entire skull. The premaxillae are not fused together, and each possess a large fang seemingly formed from three fused teeth. The front part of the premaxilla is very short, but the rear part is long, excluding the maxilla from the long nares (nostril holes). Each maxilla possesses about thirteen or fourteen acrodont teeth which are fused to the bone (as is typical for rhynchocephalians). The first six or seven teeth are tiny and simple. However, the latter seven are much larger and more complex. These teeth increase in size towards the back of the skull and possess a pointed cusp followed by a low ridge.

The nasal bones on the top of the snout are thin and separate from each other at the back of the snout to make room for the triangular front edge of the frontals. The bones of the skull roof (frontals and parietals) are not fused to their respective pairs, and the parietals form a sagittal crest between the upper temporal fenestrae on the top of the skull. The parietal foramen (a hole which holds the "third eye" in modern tuataras) is teardrop-shaped. The postorbital, jugal, and squamosal bones on the side of the head curve upwards to form the bar between the upper and lower temporal fenestrae. The jugal lacks a "subtemporal extension" forming the bottom edge of the lower temporal fenestra, leaving the hole open from the bottom as if it was an arch. The squamosal also forms a large portion of the part of the skull behind the lower temporal fenestra, along with a thin and tall quadratojugal and a curved quadrate which probably supported a tympanic membrane (eardrum).

The bones of the roof of the mouth are mostly obscured, but were partially revealed by a micro-CT scan of the specimen. Each of the palatines possess a row of teeth, although the form of such teeth cannot be determined. The palatines themselves are separated by the long and thin front parts of the pterygoids, which do not seem to possess teeth.

The lower jaw is more shallow than those of other advanced sphenodontians, but not as much as that of Pleurosaurus. It is smoothly curved, with the front tip at a higher level than the lower edge. The front part of the jaw is toothless, but the rear part has a row of teeth. Each tooth possesses a cusp preceded by a long ridge and followed by a short ridge. The outer edge of the teeth have been partially worn away by contact with the maxillary teeth.

=== Spine, tail, and ribs ===
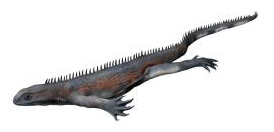
Life reconstruction

The specimen preserves seven cervical (neck) vertebrae, sixteen dorsal (back) vertebrae, two sacral (hip) vertebrae, and forty-two caudal (tail) vertebrae. This gives Vadasaurus a very long tail. The neural spines on the top of the vertebrae (particularly the cervicals) are short and rectangular. The pre- and post-zygapophyses on the side of the vertebrae are swollen, making the vertebrae hourglass-shaped from above. Each rib is thinnest in the middle. A jumble of thin bones in the middle part of the body are probably the remains of gastralia (belly ribs) and components of a cartilaginous sternum. The sacral vertebrae are partially fused to each other. Most of the caudal vertebrae possess tapering ribs which are flattened from the side. The last few caudal vertebrae are thin and very simple.

=== Limbs and pelvis ===
The humerus is short but proportionally similar to that of other rhynchocephalians when compared to the body length of the animal. The hand possesses five fingers, with the longest being finger IV, followed by fingers III, II, V, and I. The phalangeal formula of the hand (which describes the number of bones in each finger starting with finger I) is ?-3-4-5-3. Each finger ends in a curved claw. The metacarpal (hand bone) corresponding to finger I is characteristically wide.

The ilium is short and tapers towards the rear. The top edge of the pubis is large and rounded while the back edge is arched, creating a large thyroid fenestra between the pubis and ischium. The ischium is larger than the pubis and has a bony spur which could have connected to tail muscles.

The femur is S-shaped but the finer details of its structure (as well as the structure of the tibia and fibula) are poorly developed. The astragalus and calcaneum (ankle bones) are unfused. Metatarsal I (the first foot bone) is short and wide while metatarsals II-IV are much longer. Metatarsal V is even shorter and wider, with a hooked outer edge. The phalangeal formula of the foot is 2-3-4-5-4, and each toe is long and ends in a curved claw, similar to those of the hand.

== Classification ==
Vadasaurus herzogi is believed to be a close relative of the pleurosaurids according to a phylogenetic analysis published in its description. The clade comprising this genus and Pleurosauridae is itself allied with Kallimodon and Sapheosaurus. Although the structure of Rhynchocephalia as a whole is changeable depending on the methodology used in the analysis, the Vadasaurus + Pleurosauridae clade seems to be one of the most well-supported parts of the whole order. The discovery of Vadasaurus helps to depict the evolution of the pleurosaurids. Although not technically a true pleurosaurid, Vadasaurus still possesses several features characteristic of the family, such as a long tail and nares, a wide metacarpal and metatarsal I, and limbs which are less well-ossified than those of other rhynchocephalians.

The following is a cladogram of Rhynchocephalia after DeMar et al. 2022.

- - Younginia capensis
  - Prolacerta broomi
  - Lepidosauria
    - Pan-Squamata
      - Sophineta cracoviensis
      - Pristidactylus
      - Eichstaettisaurus schroederi
      - - Megachirella wachtleri
        - Marmoretta oxoniensis
    - Rhynchocephalia
      - Gephyrosaurus bridensis
      - Sphenodontia
        - Diphydontosaurus avonis
        - Acrosphenodontia
          - Planocephalosaurus robinsonae
          - - Rebbanasaurus jaini
            - - - Godavarisaurus lateefi
                - Theretairus antiquus
              - Eusphenodontia
                - Polysphenodon mulleri
                - - Opisthiamimus gregori
                  - - Clevosauridae
                      - - Clevosaurus convallis
                        - - Clevosaurus brasiliensis
                          - Clevosaurus hadroprodon
                      - - Clevosaurus bairdi
                        - - Clevosaurus hudsoni
                          - Clevosaurus cambrica
                    - Neosphenodontia
                      - Brachyrhinodon taylori
                      - - Colobops noviportensis
                        - - Sphenodontidae
                            - Sphenodon punctatus
                            - Cynosphenodon huizachalensis
                            - Sphenovipera jimmysjoyi
                            - - Kawasphenodon expectatus
                              - Kawasphenodon peligrensis
                            - Pelecymala robustus
                            - Eilenodontinae
                              - - Fraserosphenodon latidens
                                - Opisthias rarus
                              - - Eilenodon robustus
                                - - Sphenotitan leyesi
                                  - - Toxolophosaurus cloudi
                                    - Priosphenodon avelasi
                          - Leptorhynchia
                            - - Homoeosaurus maximiliani
                              - Kallimodon pulchellus
                            - - - Sigmala sigmala
                                - Vadasaurus herzogi
                              - Pleurosauridae
                                - Palaeopleurosaurus posidonae
                                - - Pleurosaurus goldfussi
                                  - Pleurosaurus ginsburgi
                            - Kallimodon cerinensis
                            - Sapheosauridae
                              - Sapheosaurus thiollierei
                              - - Ankylosphenodon pachyostosus
                                - Oenosaurus muehlheimensis

== Paleobiology ==
Vadasaurus is believed to have been at least partially aquatic, perhaps similar in lifestyle to the Galapagos marine iguana, Amblyrhynchus cristatus. It possessed thicker and heavier ribs and gastralia which may have functioned as ballast. Although a large amount of skeletal evidence provides evidence for the idea that the holotype specimen of Vadasaurus died in adulthood, the epiphyses of its forelimb bones were not completely fused. This is further evidence for a semiaquatic lifestyle, as animals which spend a large portion of their time in the water do not experience the forces of terrestrial locomotion to the same extent as fully terrestrial animals. Although the limb bones of terrestrial animals strengthen during development, semiaquatic animals have less need for such strengthening, and as a lineage becomes more inclined to an aquatic lifestyle, the limbs become less inclined to fully ossify as they develop. Vadasaurus's not-fully-fused forelimbs are an intermediate form between the strong limbs of terrestrial rhynchocephalians and the weaker limbs of pleurosaurids.
