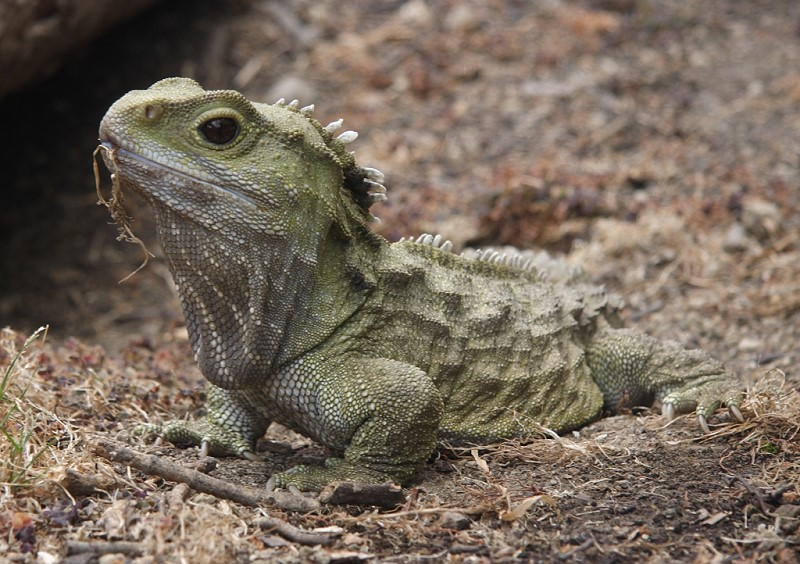
- Tuatara (Sphenodon punctatus)
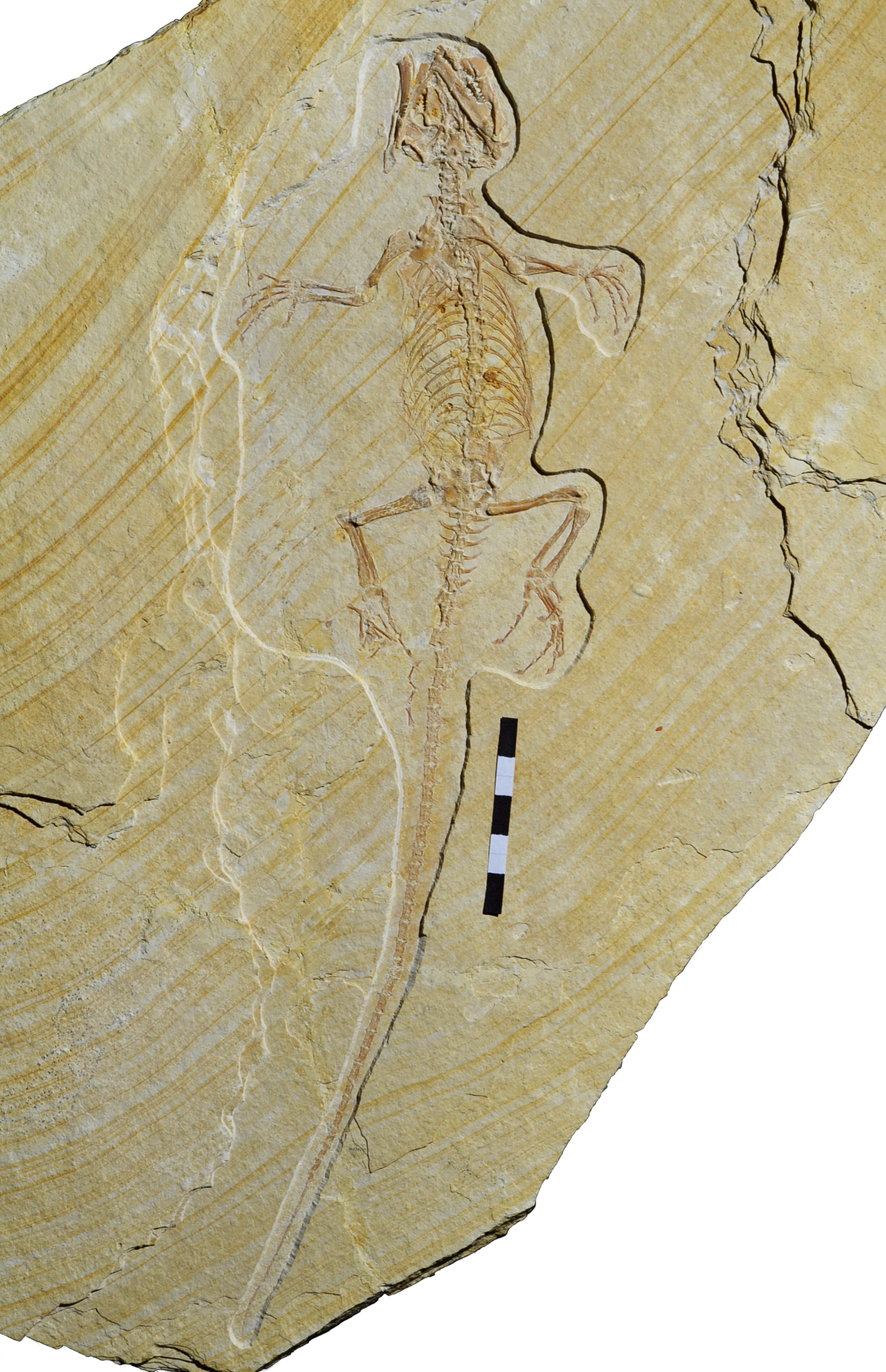
- Skeleton of Sphenofontis, a sphenodontine from the Late Jurassic of Germany

Scientific classification
- Kingdom: Animalia
- Phylum: Chordata
- Class: Reptilia
- Order: Rhynchocephalia
- Suborder: Sphenodontia
- Infraorder: Eusphenodontia
- Clade: Neosphenodontia
- Family: Sphenodontidae; Cope, 1870 (conserved name)

Type species
- Hatteria punctata Gray, 1842

Subgroups
- †Eilenodontinae?; †Opisthias?; †Trullidens?; †Ankylosphenodon?; †Derasmosaurus?; †Pamizinsaurus; †Zapatadon; †Sphenovipera; †Alamitosphenos; Sphenodontinae; †Cynosphenodon; †Tika; †Sphenofontis; †Navajosphenodon; †Kawasphenodon; †Notosphenos; Sphenodon

Synonyms
- Hatteriidae Cope, 1864 (rejected name); Rhynchocephalidae Hoffmann, 1881 (rejected name)

= Sphenodontidae =

Sphenodontidae Temporal range: Late Triassic–Recent

Family of reptiles

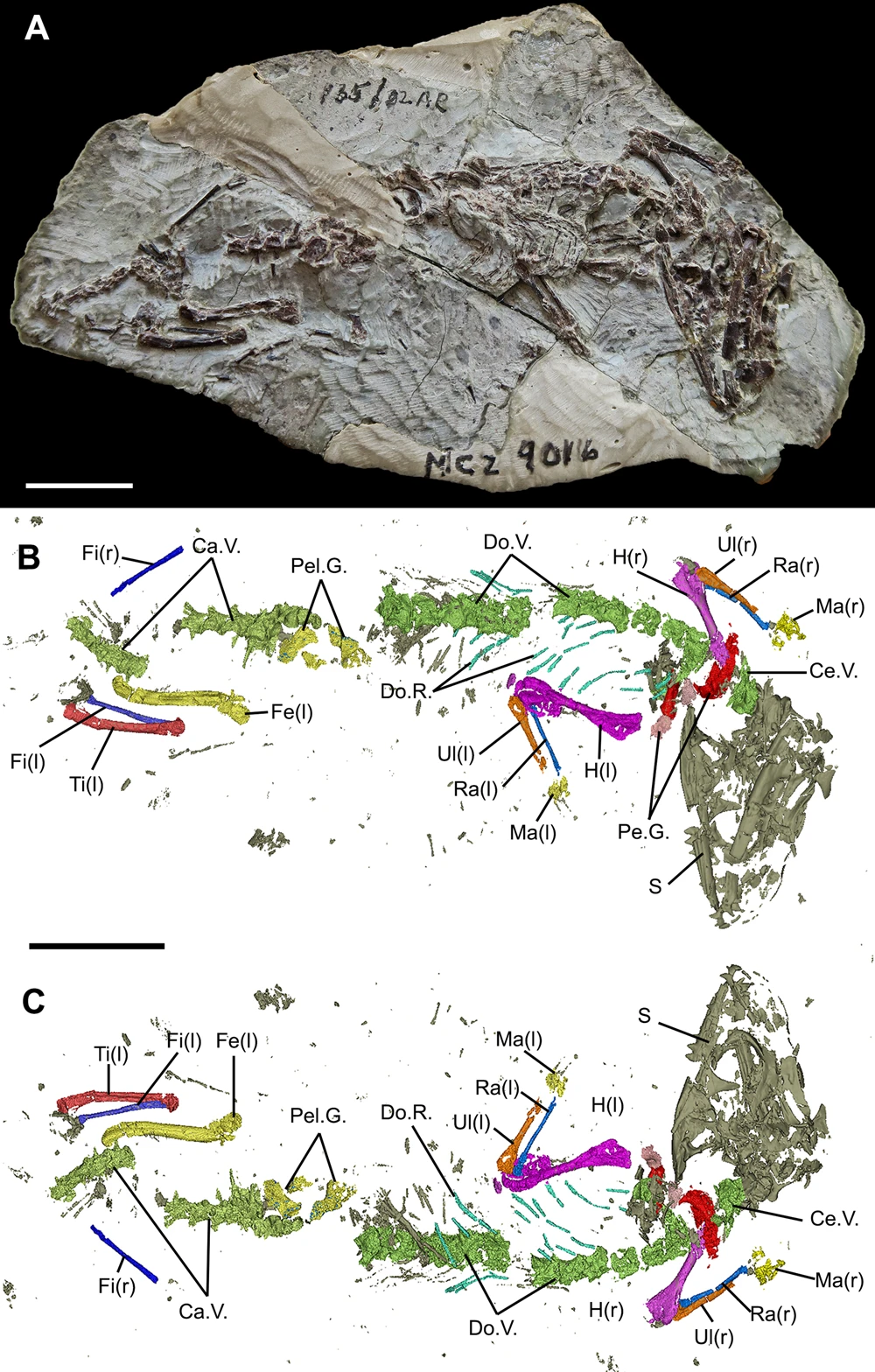
Skeleton of Navajosphenodon from the Early Jurassic of North America, one of the oldest sphenodontines.

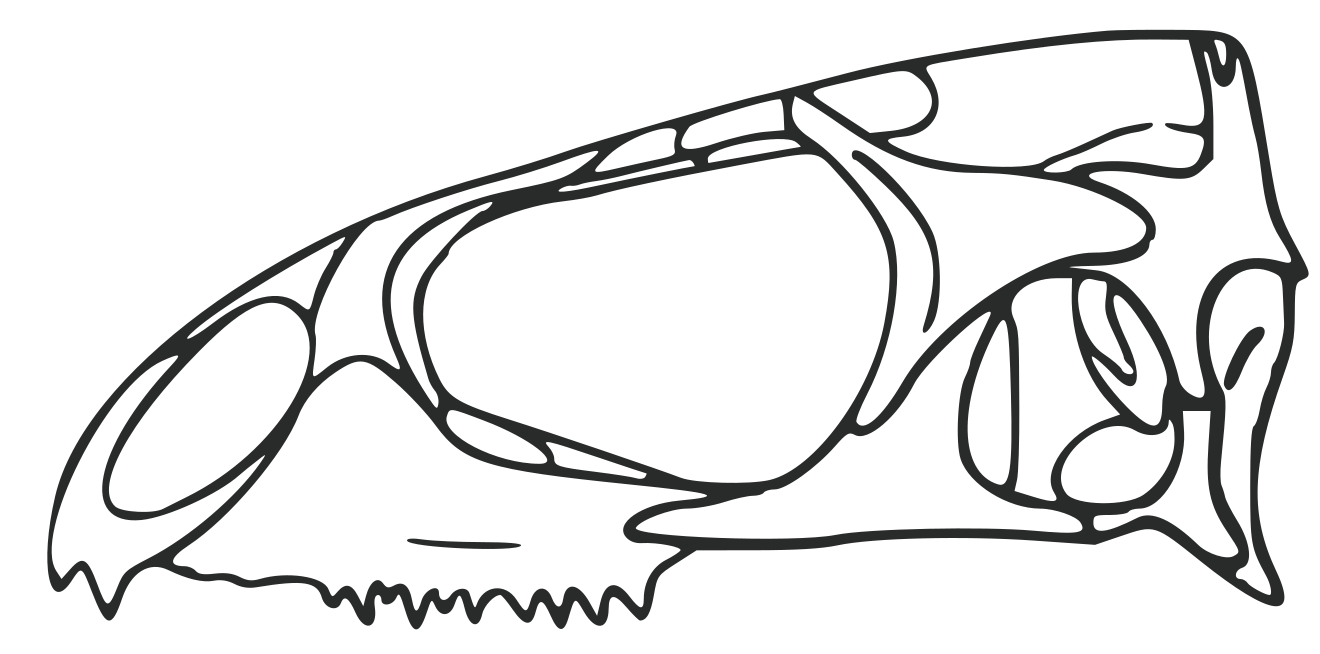
Illustration of the skull of Navajosphenodon in lateral view, showing closed temporal bar (bottom right)

Sphenodontidae is a family within the reptile group Rhynchocephalia, comprising taxa most closely related to the living tuatara (Sphenodon punctatus). Historically the taxa included within Sphenodontidae have varied greatly between analyses, and the group has lacked a formal definition. Cynosphenodon from the Jurassic of Mexico has consistently been recovered as a close relative of the tuatara in most analyses, with the clade containing the two and other very close relatives of the tuatara often called Sphenodontinae.

The herbivorous Eilenodontinae, otherwise considered part of Opisthodontia, is considered to be part of this family in many recent studies as the sister group to Sphenodontinae. The earliest sphenodontines are known from the Early Jurassic of North America, with other remains known from the Late Jurassic of Europe, the Late Cretaceous and possibly Paleocene of South America and the Miocene-recent of New Zealand.

Sphenodontines are characterised by a complete lower temporal bar caused by the fusion of a forward directed process (extension) of the quadrate/quadratojugal and the jugal, which was an adaptation for reducing stress in the skull during hard biting. Other synapomorphies of Sphenodontinae include the presence of nasal foramina, a posterodorsal process of the coronoid of the lower jaw, the present of caniniform successional teeth at the front of the jaws, the presence of flanges on the posterior parts of teeth at back of the lower jaw, and an expanded radial condyle on the humerus.

Like modern tuatara, members of Sphenodontinae were likely generalists with a carnivorous/insectivorous diet.

Cladogram after Simoes et al. 2022:

- Sphenodontia
  - †Diphydontosaurus
  - Eusphenodontia
    - †Planocephalosaurus
    - †Clevosaurus
    - Neosphenodontia
      - - - †Homoeosaurus
          - †Pleurosauridae
            - †Palaeopleurosaurus
            - - †Derasmosaurus
              - †Pleurosaurus
          - - - †Leptosaurus
              - †Kallimodon
            - †Sapheosauridae
              - †Piocormus
              - †Oenosaurus
              - †Sapheosaurus
        - Sphenodontidae
          - †Eilenodontinae
            - †Sphenotitan
            - - †Eilenodon
              - - †Toxolophosaurus
                - †Priosphenodon
          - Sphenodontinae
            - †Navajosphenodon
            - †Cynosphenodon
            - - †Sphenofontis
              - - †Kawasphenodon
                - Sphenodon (tuatara)
