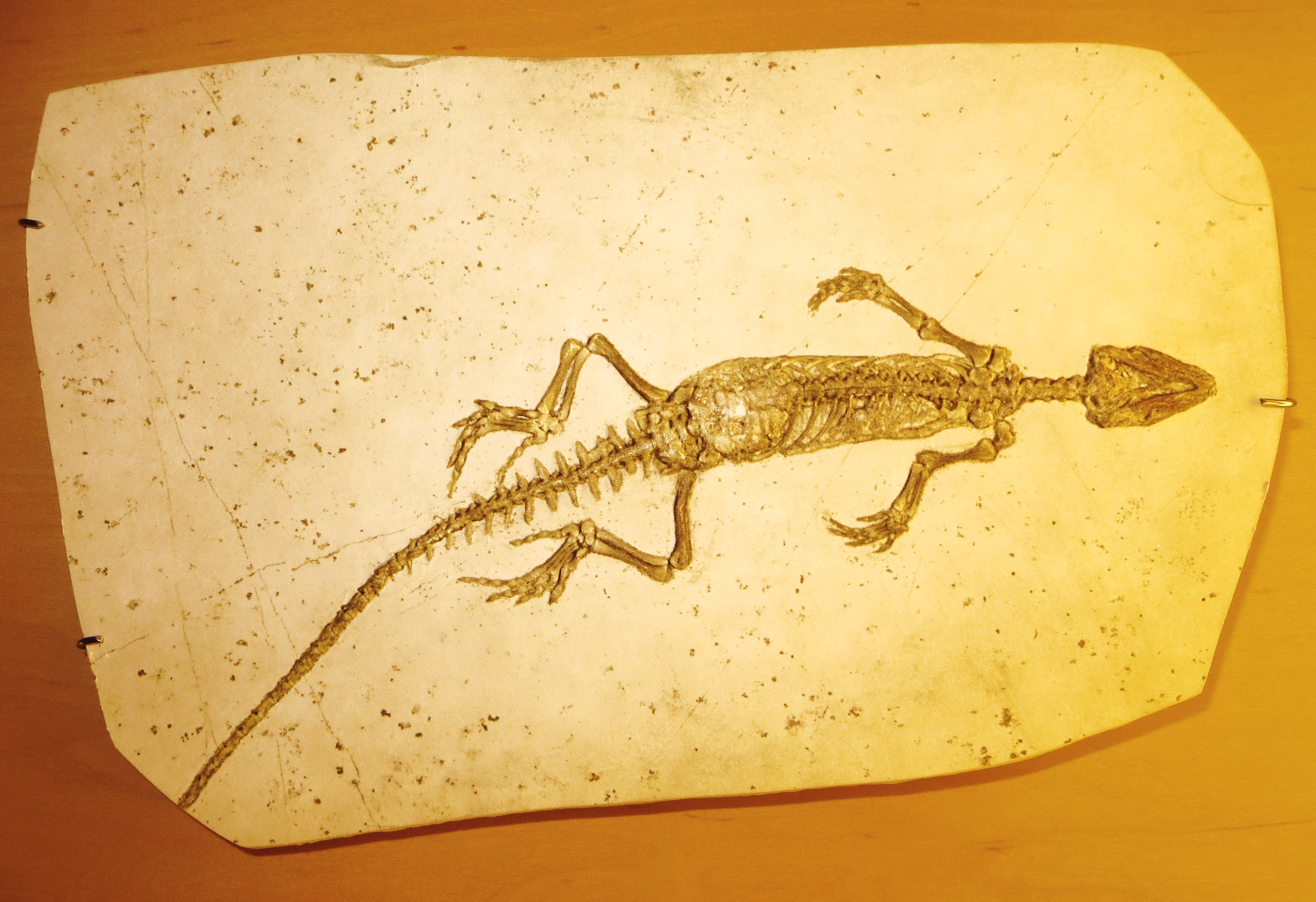
- Kallimodon pulchellus

Scientific classification
- Kingdom: Animalia
- Phylum: Chordata
- Class: Reptilia
- Order: Rhynchocephalia
- Suborder: Sphenodontia
- Genus: †Kallimodon; Cocude-Michel, 1963

Type species
- †K. pulchellus (Zittel, 1887)

Other species
- †K. cerinensis Cocude-Michel, 1963

= Kallimodon =

Kallimodon Temporal range: Late Jurassic

Extinct genus of reptiles

Kallimodon is a genus of sphenodontian reptile from the Late Jurassic of Bavaria, southern Germany and France.

== History and species ==
Kallimodon pulchellus was originally described as a species of Homoeosaurus by Karl von Zittel in 1887. However, in 1963 it was renamed Kallimodon due to differences from the Homoeosaurus type species.

A second species, Kallimodon cerinensis, was named by Cocude-Michel, 1963 after 2 specimens from the late Kimmeridgian Cerin Lagerstätte in France : MDC 20015671, MDC 20015675 and its counterpart MDC 20015674 that were formerly referred to as Sauranodon incisivus, (Jourdan, 1862), which is now regarded as a synonym of Sapheosaurus thiollierei. This species was synonymized with K. pulchellus as Leptosaurus pulchellus by Fabre, 1981 However, it was revalidated by recent studies. A third specimen is also known from late Kimmeridgian to early Tithonian Drigas quarry lagerstätte in the Causse Méjean lithographic limestones.

In 1997, Kallimodon was sunk as a junior synonym of Leptosaurus, with the type species referred to as L. pulchellus. However, subsequent studies find Kallimodon to be valid and distinct from Leptosaurus. One specimen previously referred to this genus is actually a distinct taxon.

== Description ==
The skull lacks a quadratojugal process of the jugal. The fourth metacarpal and metatarsal bones of the forefoot and hindfoot, respectively, are longer than the third digits of these feet. The unguals are relatively flat. Preserved soft tissue shows that Kallimodon pulchellus had square scales on the tail region.

== Ecology ==
The morphology of the limbs resembles those of terrestrial lizards, but Kallimodon has been suggested as semi-aquatic, which may be supported by the finding of apparent fish remains in the body cavity of one specimen, which may represent stomach contents.

== Phylogeny ==
In recent studies, Kallimodon has been recovered as part of the clade Leptorhynchia, which also includes the sapheosaurs, pleurosaurs and Homoeosaurus, among others.

Cladogram after Beccari et al. 2025:

- Rhynchocephalia
  - †Gephyrosaurus
  - Sphenodontia
    - †Diphydontosaurus
    - - †Planocephalosaurus
      - Eusphenodontia
        - †Clevosaurus (paraphyletic)
        - Neosphenodontia
          - Sphenodontidae
            - †Eilenodontinae
              - †Priosphenodon
              - †Sphenotitan
            - Sphenodontinae
              - †Opisthiamimus
              - - †Navajosphenodon
                - - †Sphenofontis
                  - Sphenodon (tuatara)
          - Leptorhynchia
            - †Homoeosaurus solnhofensis
            - - - - †Homoeosaurus maximiliani
                  - †Homoeosaurus parvipes
                - - †Sphenodraco
                  - †Kallimodon
              - - †Pleurosauridae
                  - †Derasmosaurus
                  - - †Ankylosphenodon
                    - - †Palaeopleurosaurus
                      - - †Acrosaurus
                        - †Pleurosaurus
                - - †Vadasaurus
                  - †Sapheosauridae
                    - †Sapheosaurus
                    - - †Piocormus
                      - †Oenosaurus
