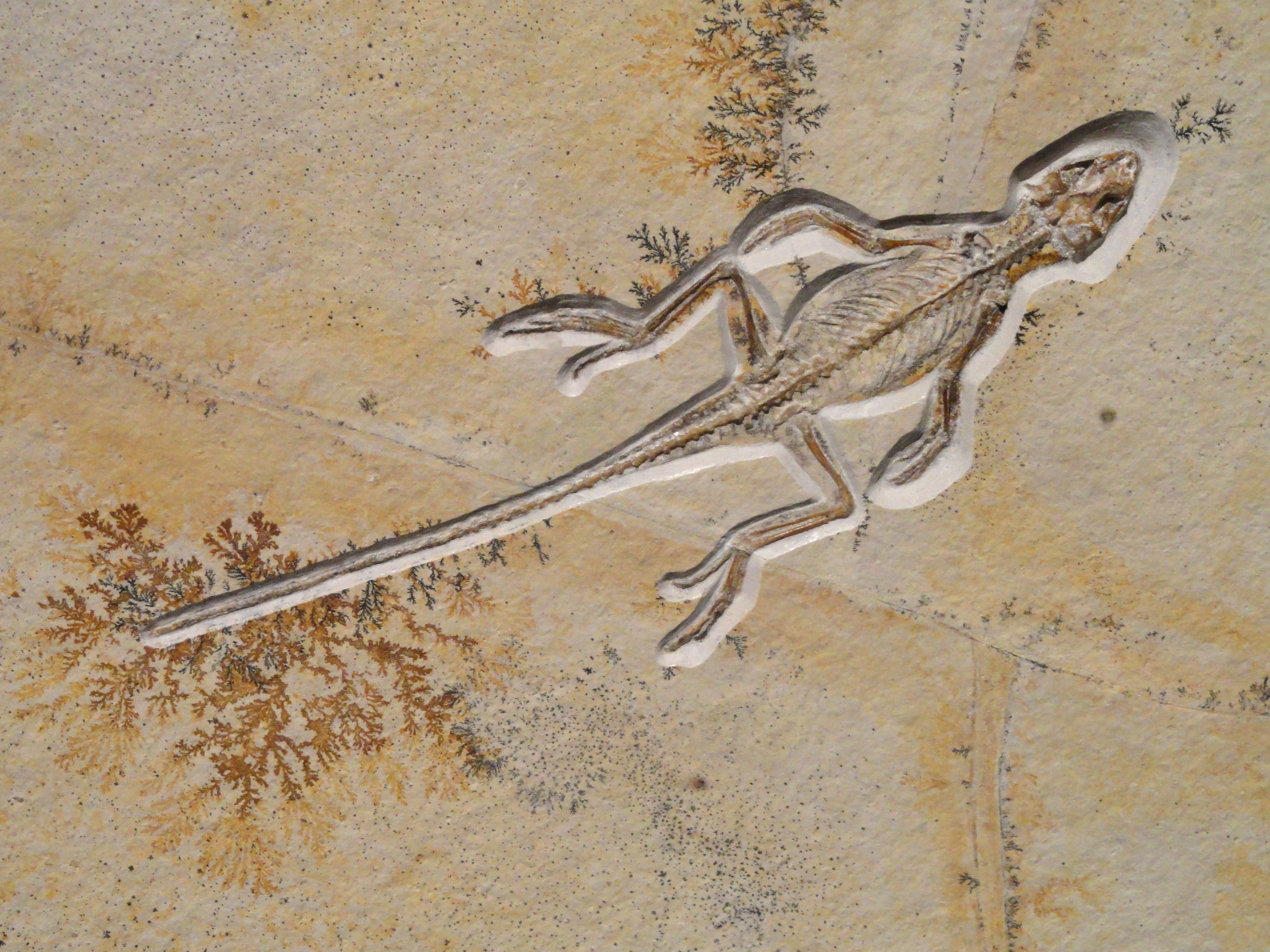
- Homoeosaurus maximiliani

Scientific classification
- Kingdom: Animalia
- Phylum: Chordata
- Class: Reptilia
- Order: Rhynchocephalia
- Suborder: Sphenodontia
- Infraorder: Eusphenodontia
- Clade: Neosphenodontia
- Genus: †Homoeosaurus von Meyer, 1847

Type species
- †H. maximiliani von Meyer, 1847

Other species
- †H. major Boulenger, 1891; †H. parvipes Cocude-Michel, 1963; †H. solnhofensis Cocude-Michel, 1963

= Homoeosaurus =

Homoeosaurus Temporal range: 150–140 Ma Late Jurassic - Early Cretaceous

Extinct genus of reptiles

Homoeosaurus is an extinct genus of rhynchocephalian reptile, known from the Late Jurassic-earliest Cretaceous of Europe, with specimens being reported from France (Canjuers Lagerstatte), England (Purbeck Group) and Germany (Solnhofen Limestone). Several species have been described within the genus, based on varying proportions of the limb bones to the body length based on the presacral vertebrae. Specimen C.M.6438 of H. maximiliani from Germany has a total length of around 17 centimetres (6.7 in), with a skull length of about 1.7 centimetres (0.67 in). In comparison to other rhynchocephalians, the limbs are proportionally long. Recent studies have classified Homoeosaurus as a member of Neosphenodontia, with some studies including it as part of the clade Leptorhynchia, also including sapheosaurs, pleurosaurs, Kallimodon and Vadasaurus. Despite being found in aquatic deposits, it is suggested to have been terrestrial. Analysis of its limb bone morphology suggests that it was probably capable of climbing and may have climbed trees and/or rocky surfaces at least some of the time. It is thought to have been a carnivore/insectivore. One specimen was found as stomach contents of the fish Belonostomus.

Cladogram after Beccari et al. 2025:

- Rhynchocephalia
  - †Gephyrosaurus
  - Sphenodontia
    - †Diphydontosaurus
    - - †Planocephalosaurus
      - Eusphenodontia
        - †Clevosaurus (paraphyletic)
        - Neosphenodontia
          - Sphenodontidae
            - †Eilenodontinae
              - †Priosphenodon
              - †Sphenotitan
            - Sphenodontinae
              - †Opisthiamimus
              - - †Navajosphenodon
                - - †Sphenofontis
                  - Sphenodon (tuatara)
          - - †Homoeosaurus solnhofensis
            - - - - †Homoeosaurus maximiliani
                  - †Homoeosaurus parvipes
                - - †Sphenodraco
                  - †Kallimodon
              - - †Pleurosauridae
                  - †Derasmosaurus
                  - - †Ankylosphenodon
                    - - †Palaeopleurosaurus
                      - - †Acrosaurus
                        - †Pleurosaurus
                - - †Vadasaurus
                  - †Sapheosauridae
                    - †Sapheosaurus
                    - - †Piocormus
                      - †Oenosaurus
