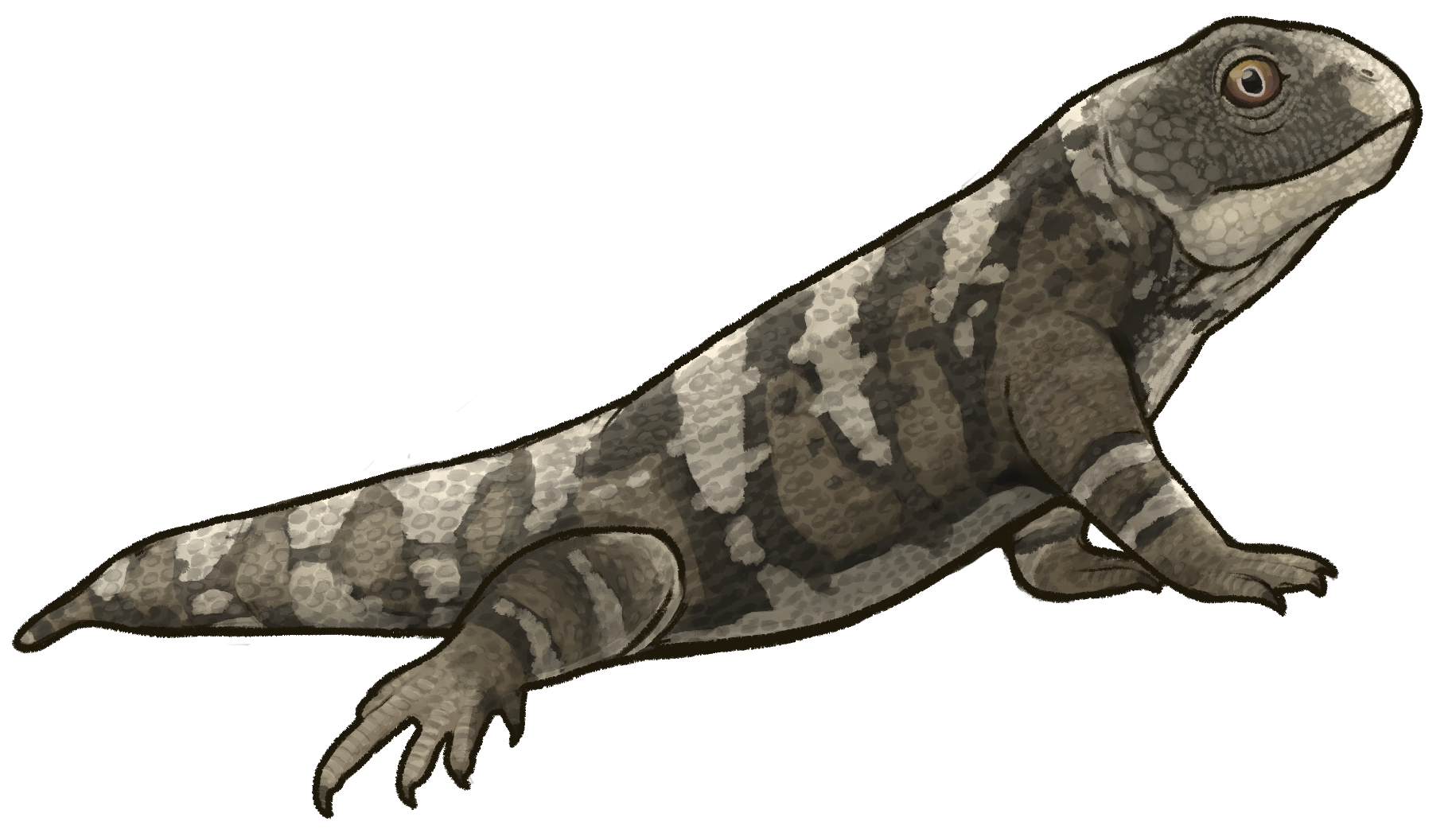

Scientific classification
- Kingdom: Animalia
- Phylum: Chordata
- Class: Reptilia
- Order: Rhynchocephalia
- Clade: Neosphenodontia
- Genus: †Pamizinsaurus; Reynoso, 1997

Type species
- †Pamizinsaurus tlayuaensis Reynoso, 1997

= Pamizinsaurus =

Pamizinsaurus Temporal range: Albian

Extinct genus of reptiles

Pamizinsaurus is a genus of sphenodontian reptile known from Lower Cretaceous (Albian) Tlayúa Formation of central Mexico. It was named Pamizinsaurus tlayuaensis by Reynoso in 1997, after Tlayua Quarry where it was found. It is known from the crushed skeleton of a juvenile individual, with a skull length of around 16 millimetres (0.63 in), and a total length of about 77 millimetres (3.0 in). The fossil was covered in small round osteoscutes, unique among known sphenodontians but similar to those of helodermatid lizards like the Gila monster, which probably served to protect it from predators.

== Taxonomy ==
=== Discovery and formal description ===
The holotype and only known specimen of Pamizinsaurus (IGM 6854), a juvenile, was discovered in strata from the Middle Member of the Tlayúa Formation, a Lagerstätte near Tepexi de Rodríguez in Central Mexico known for its vertebrate fossils. On collection, the specimen was transported to the Geological Institute of the National Autonomous University of Mexico. In 1997, Victor-Hugo Reynoso formally described the genus. The genus name comes from the Nahuatl pamizintli ("with corn on top"), referring to the rows of osteoderms covering its body, and the Latin saurus ("reptile"). The species name, P. tlayuaensis, derives from the Nahuatl tlayua ("place of darkness"), and refers to the Tlayúa Formation.

=== Classification ===
Reynoso (1997) argued that Pamizinsaurus was a genus of the subfamily Sphenodontinae; grouping it with the modern Sphenodon (better known as the tuatara), Zapatadon, Cynosphenodon, Homoeosaurus, Sapheosaurus, and Ankylosphenodon. Later papers suggested a derived position among sphenodontians, but with an uncertain relationship to other derived sphenodontians.

== Description ==
The holotype of Pamizinsaurus is a juvenile. Its skull, measured from the tip of the premaxilla to the occipital condyle, was around 1.6 cm (0.63 in). The presacral vertebral column (the cervical and dorsal vertebrae) measures around 3.6 cm (1.4 in). The total length of the tail is around 2.5 cm (0.98 in).

=== Anatomy ===
Pamizinsaurus' skull is heavily eroded, with only the mandibles, still articulated to the quadrate, being well preserved. Regardless, the premaxilla and maxilla are preserved well enough to be described. The premaxilla has three large, acrodont teeth, as the holotype was too young to possess the chisel-like teeth typical of sphenodonts. It had five maxillary teeth, which were large and conical. The teeth mostly alternated in size, with the second and fourth teeth being smaller than the rest. The same is true of the mandible, which had eleven teeth. Details of Pamizinsaurus' axial skeleton are difficult to discern, as much of the body is covered in osteoderms and calcified soft tissue. The osteoderms were numerous, varied in size, and can be divided into two categories: dumbbell-shaped and hexagonal osteoderms. On the tail, the osteoderms aer arranged in rings, gradually decreasing in number the further along the tail they are. The number and overall shape of the cervical and dorsal vertebrae is unclear. The distal phalanges of the left hand are preserved, and are more slender than those of the toes. Due to the fragmentary nature of the specimen, it is impossible to determine how many phalanges there actually were, though it was probably the same number as in other sphenodonts.

== Palaeoenvironment ==
The palaeoenvironment of the Tlayúa Formation, from which Pamizinsaurus is known, was likely a shallow coastal lagoon. It may have formed part of an island, though a connection to the North American mainland cannot be ruled out. A certain degree of influence from freshwater environments is indicated by the presence of fossils from crocodilians and freshwater turtles.
