= Tika giacchinoi =

Tika Temporal range: Albian, ~111–106 Ma

Scientific classification
- Kingdom: Animalia
- Phylum: Chordata
- Class: Reptilia
- Order: Rhynchocephalia
- Family: Sphenodontidae
- Subfamily: Sphenodontinae
- Genus: †Tika; Apesteguía, Garberoglio & Gómez, 2021
- Species: †T. giacchinoi

Binomial name
- †Tika giacchinoi Apesteguía, Garberoglio & Gómez, 2021

Extinct species of reptiles

Tika is an extinct genus of sphenodontian from the Early Cretaceous (Albian) Candeleros Formation of Argentina. The type species is Tika giacchinoi. It is considered to be closely related to the tuatara, (Sphenodon punctatus), and a member of the Sphenodontinae. It is the oldest member of Sphenodontinae known from South America.

== Description ==
The type specimen consists of a partial skeleton including an incomplete right-lower jaw, and parts of the skull (an incomplete left palatine and a right quadrate), two articulated dorsal vertebrae, an incomplete ulna, as well as a humerus and a femur. Referred material includes two maxillas with associated lower jaws. The skull is estimated to have been around 3.9–4.2 centimetres (1.5–1.7 in) long when complete, making Tika moderately-sized among sphenodontians. The caniniform tooth at the front of the lower jaw is sharper than that of the tuatara. The maxilla is similar to that of the tuatara in its overall form. The palate has a row of conical teeth, similar to that of the tuatara.

== Taxonomy ==
Tika was recovered as a member of Sphenodontinae, in a polytomy with Cynosphenodon, Kawasphenodon, and Sphenodon (the tuatara).

== Ecology ==
Tika is one of two sphenodontians known from the Candeleros Formation, alongside the distantly related herbivorous sphenodontian Priosphenodon. Like other sphenodontines, Tika is thought to have been carnivorous and to have fed on insects and small vertebrates, such as juvenile Najash, Priosphenodon and young Cronopio.
