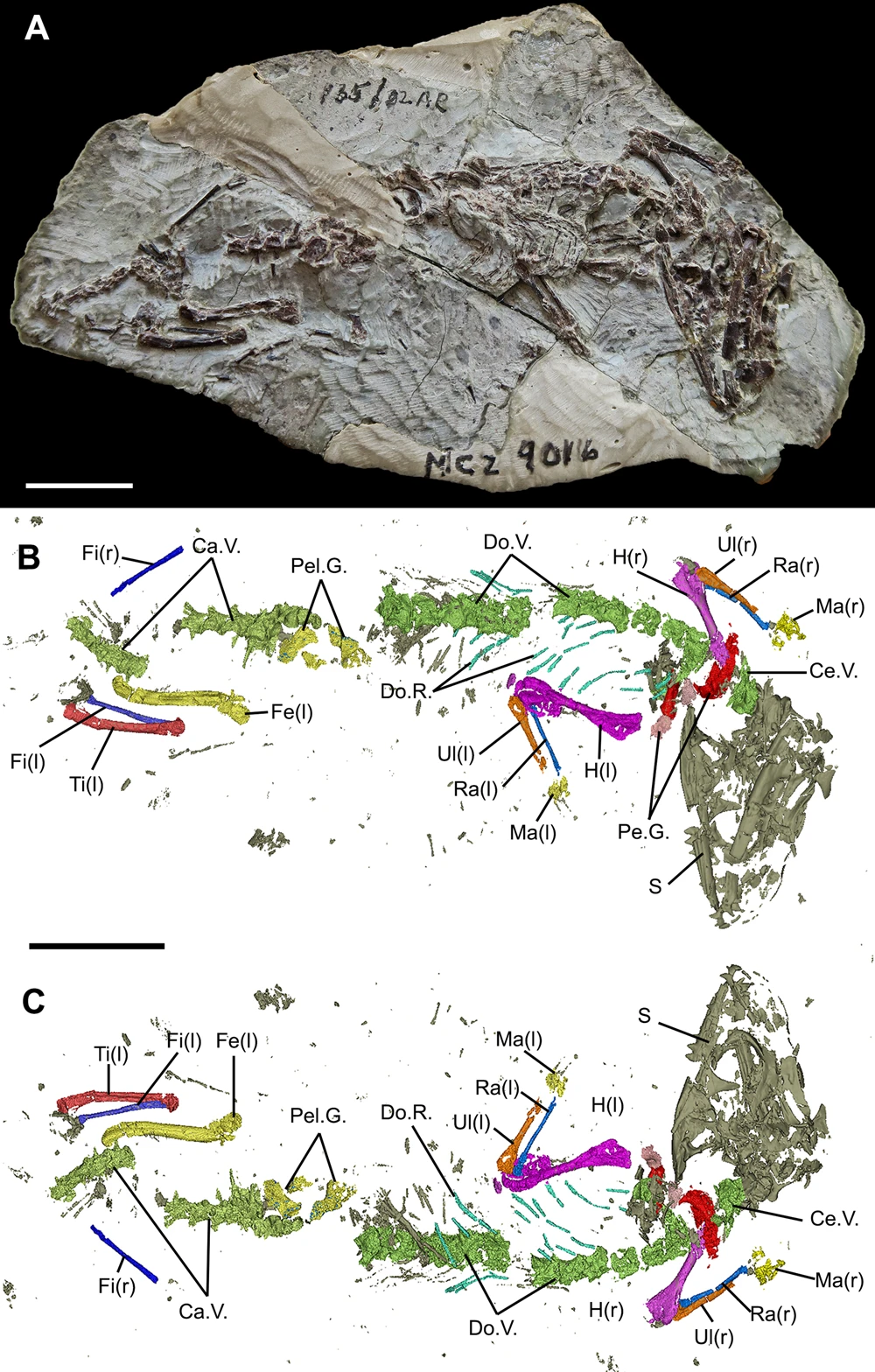
- Holotype specimen, scale bar: 1 cm

Scientific classification
- Kingdom: Animalia
- Phylum: Chordata
- Class: Reptilia
- Order: Rhynchocephalia
- Family: Sphenodontidae
- Subfamily: Sphenodontinae
- Genus: †Navajosphenodon; Simões, Kinney-Broderick & Pierce, 2022

Type species
- Navajosphenodon sani Simões, Kinney-Broderick & Pierce, 2022

= Navajosphenodon =

Navajosphenodon Temporal range: Sinemurian–Pliensbachian

Extinct genus of reptile

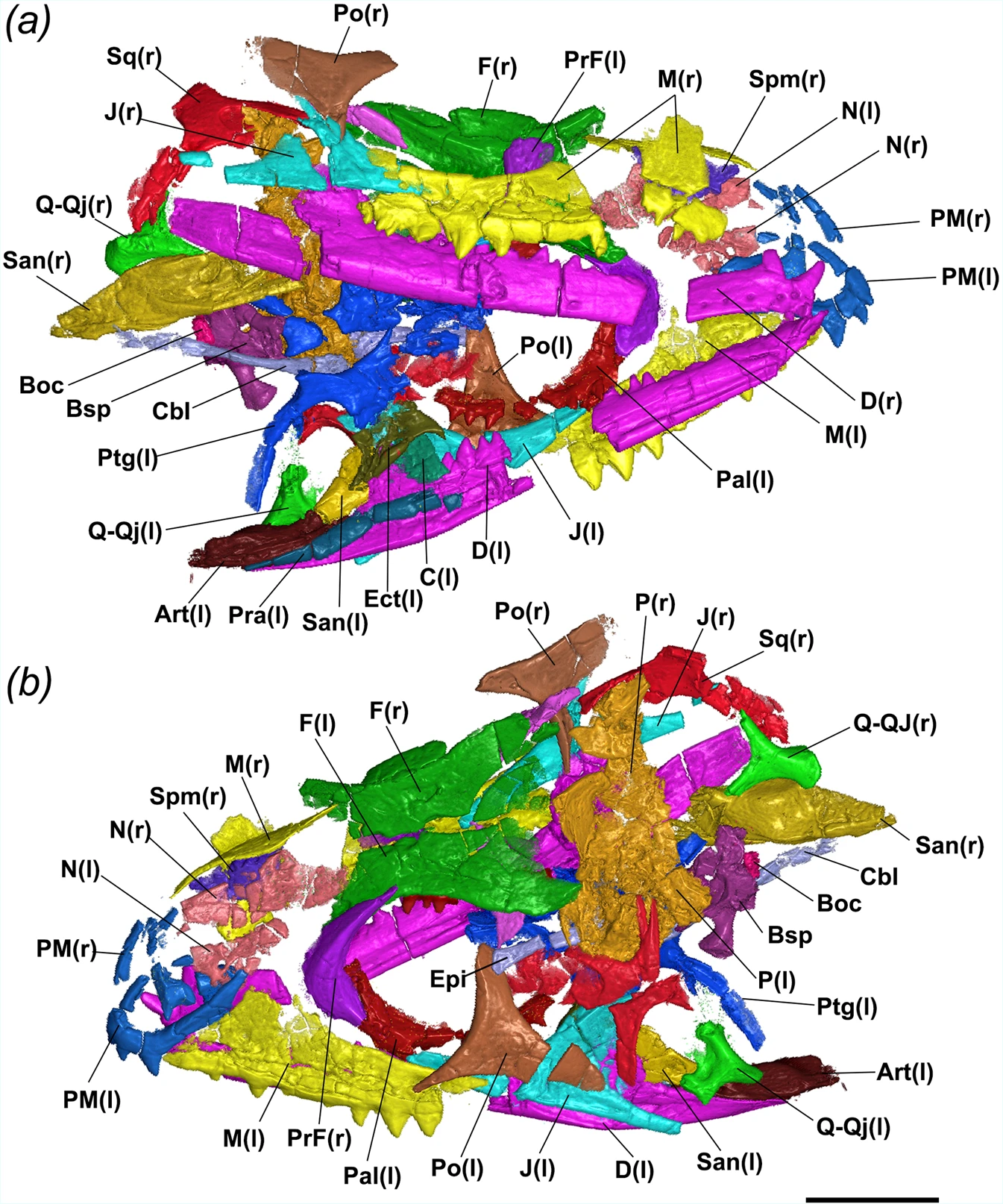
CT scan of skull

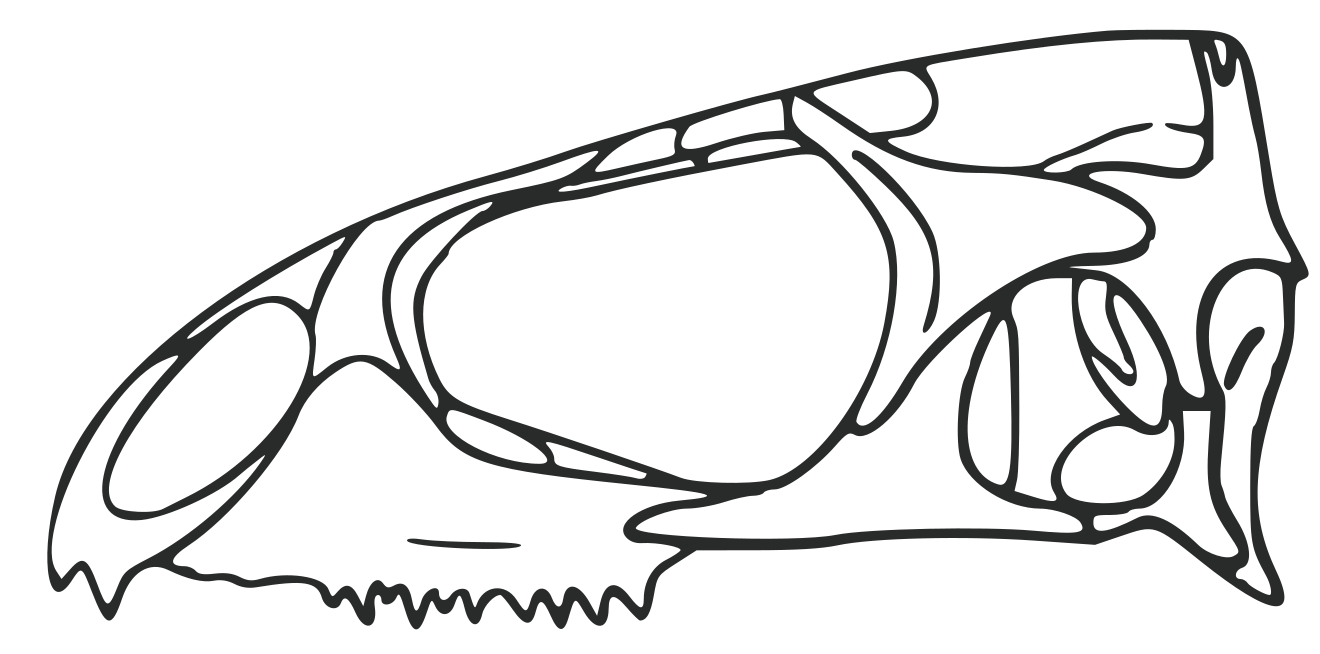
Illustration of the skull in lateral view

Navajosphenodon is an extinct genus of sphenodontid reptile from the Early Jurassic Kayenta Formation of Arizona, United States. It is known from a fully articulated skull and skeleton (the holotype, MNA.V.12442) and several referred specimens, representing individuals of various ontogenetic stages. Navajosphenodon is similar in many aspects to the extant tuatara, both belonging to the Sphenodontinae, including sharing a complete lower temporal bar. It is one of the oldest known sphenodontines.

- Sphenodontia
  - †Diphydontosaurus
  - Eusphenodontia
    - †Planocephalosaurus
    - †Clevosaurus
    - Neosphenodontia
      - - - †Homoeosaurus
          - †Pleurosauridae
          - - †Leptosaurus +†Kallimodon
            - †Sapheosauridae
        - Sphenodontidae
          - †Eilenodontinae
          - Sphenodontinae
            - †Navajosphenodon
            - †Cynosphenodon
            - - †Sphenofontis
              - - †Kawasphenodon
                - Sphenodon (tuatara)
