= Cynosphenodon =

Cynosphenodon Temporal range: Pliensbachian-Toarcian
- Diagram of preserved skull elements

Scientific classification
- Kingdom: Animalia
- Phylum: Chordata
- Class: Reptilia
- Order: Rhynchocephalia
- Family: Sphenodontidae
- Subfamily: Sphenodontinae
- Genus: †Cynosphenodon; Reynoso, 1996

Type species
- †Cynosphenodon huizachalensis Reynoso, 1996

Extinct genus of reptiles

Cynosphenodon (/ˌsaɪnəˈsfɛnədɒn/ SY-nə-SFEN-ə-don; "Dog Sphenodontian") is an extinct genus of rhynchocephalian in the family Sphenodontidae from the Lower Jurassic sediments of the La Boca Formation of Tamaulipas, Mexico. It is known from a largely complete lower jaw and fragments of the upper jaw. It is suggested to be among the closest known relatives of the tuatara, with both being placed in the Sphenodontinae, which is supported by among other characters, the growth pattern of the teeth.

Cladogram after Simoes et al. 2022.

- Sphenodontia
  - †Diphydontosaurus
  - Eusphenodontia
    - †Planocephalosaurus
    - †Clevosaurus
    - Neosphenodontia
      - - - †Homoeosaurus
          - †Pleurosauridae
          - - †Leptosaurus +†Kallimodon
            - †Sapheosauridae
        - Sphenodontidae
          - †Eilenodontinae
          - Sphenodontinae
            - †Navajosphenodon
            - †Cynosphenodon
            - - †Sphenofontis
              - - †Kawasphenodon
                - Sphenodon (tuatara)
