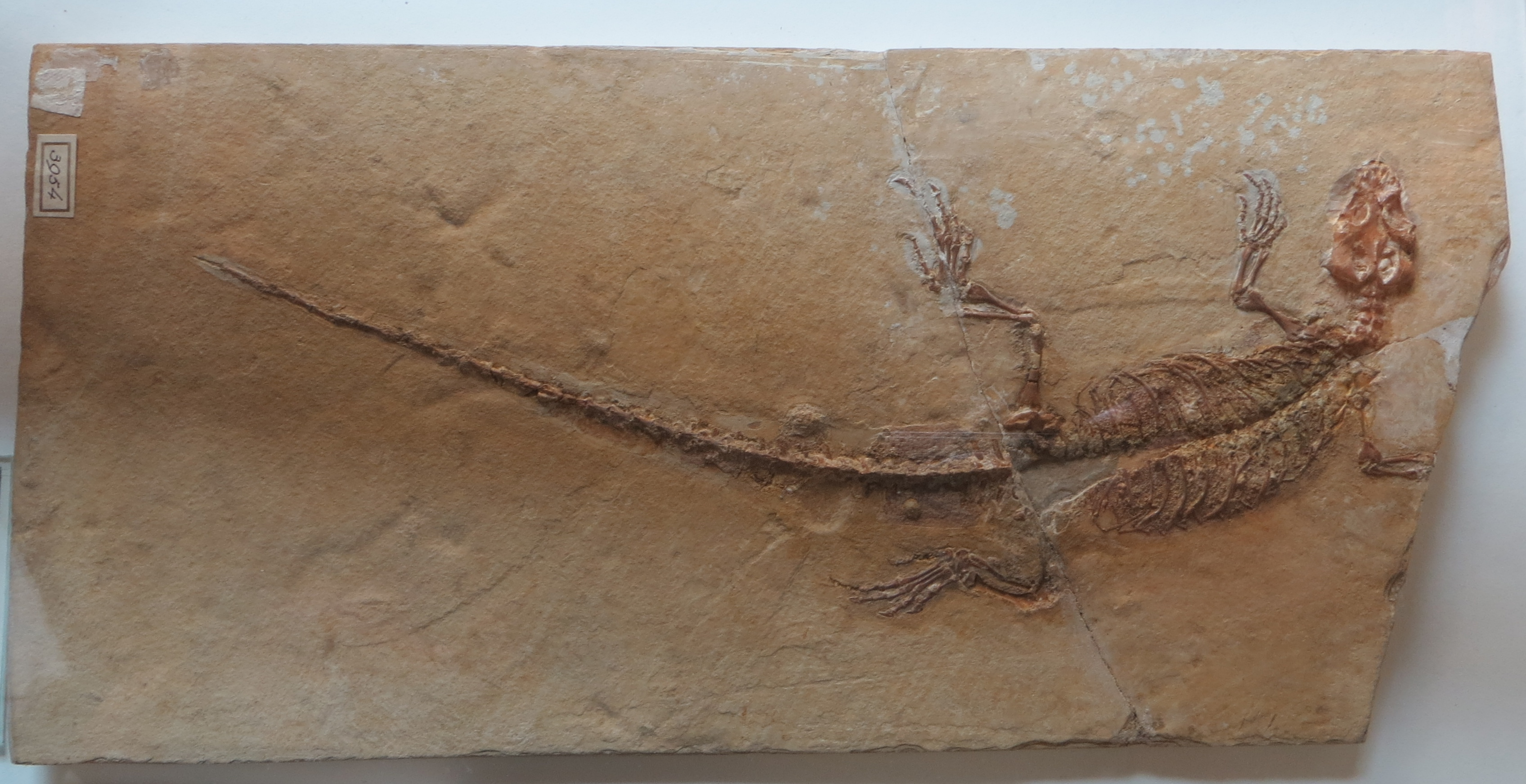
- Skeleton of Piocormus

Scientific classification
- Kingdom: Animalia
- Phylum: Chordata
- Class: Reptilia
- Order: Rhynchocephalia
- Suborder: Sphenodontia
- Family: †Sapheosauridae; Baur 1895

Genera
- †Oenosaurus; †Piocormus; †Sapheosaurus; †Ankylosphenodon?; †Kallimodon?; †Leptosaurus?

= Sapheosaur =

Sapheosaurids Temporal range: Late Jurassic

Extinct group of reptiles

Sapheosaurs are an extinct group of rhynchocephalian reptiles from the Late Jurassic period. "Sapheosaurs" is an informal name for a group of rhynchocephalians closely related to the genus Sapheosaurus. It was first recognized as a group containing multiple genera by Hoffstetter in 1955. The group has sometimes been given a formal taxonomic name as the family Sapheosauridae, although in some analyses this group belongs to the family Sphenodontidae (which also contains the tuatara, the only living rhynchocephalian) and thus cannot be assigned its own family. They were fairly advanced rhynchocephalians which may have had semiaquatic habits.

== Classification ==
The most well-known members of the group are Sapheosaurus and Kallimodon, and most phylogenetic analyses on rhynchocephalians only study these two genera as representatives of sapheosaurs. Although a few early phylogenies in the 1990s did not find that these two formed a natural clade, the relation between these two is now considered to be more stable, and has been found in practically every major analysis of rhynchocephalians since Apesteguía & Novas (2003).

However, the relation between sapheosaurs as a whole and other rhynchocephalians is less clear. Although they are clearly members of the group Sphenodontia like almost all other rhynchocephalians, the construction of their jaw joints means that they were unable to move their jaws in a front-to-back chewing movement. This excludes them from the clade of sphenodonts which are capable of such movement, the so-called "eupropalinal sphenodonts" such as the tuatara, (formally known as Sphenodon), its close relatives, and the herbivorous opisthodonts. They are also generally considered to be more derived (as in closer to Sphenodon) than clevosaurs and basal genera such as Godavarisaurus and Sphenocondor. The in-group relations of sphenodonts are inconsistent between analyses, so although sapheosaurs may be the sister group of eupropalinal sphenodonts under some methodologies, other potentially more derived taxon include Homoeosaurus, Pamizinsaurus, Ankylosphenodon, the Sphenovipera+Theretairus clade, and pleurosaurs.

A 2017 study utilizing both parsimony and bayesian analyses found some support for a clade including sapheosaurs, Vadasaurus, and pleurosaurs. Although the bayesian analysis placed this clade in a large polytomy with various other rhynchocephalian groups and genera, the parsimony analysis actually placed it among the eupropalinal sphenodonts. If this phylogeny is accurate, this would mean that an ancestor of this clade lost front-to-back chewing which was present in an even earlier ancestor, rather than never having it in the first place. A 2022 study found a clade containing pleurosaurs, Vadasaurus, sapheosaurs, Homoeosaurus, Kallimodon and Leptosaurus, to the exclusion of other neosphenodontians like Sphenodontidae. This clade was called Leptorhynchia.

== Description ==
All known members of the group lived in coastal environments of the late Jurassic in what is now Germany and France. They are very similar to each other, only noticeably differing in certain proportions of the skull. Evans (1988) and Ahmad (1993) have even considered that they may all belong to a single species, although a shortage of good studies and descriptions focusing on this group in particular means that any conclusions on the relationships between different sapheosaurs are uncertain at best.

=== Skull ===
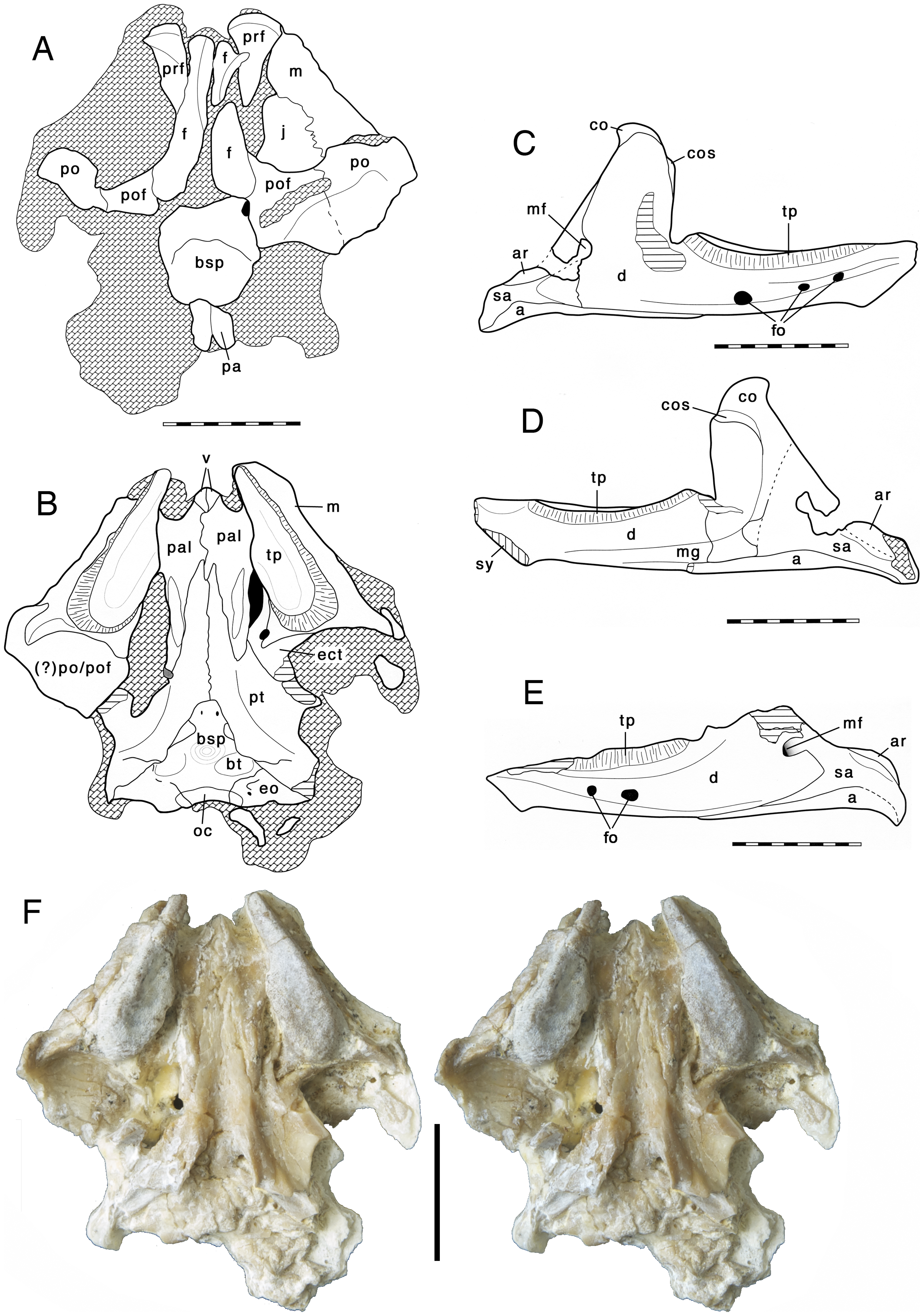
Underside of the skull of and lower jaw of Oenosaurus, showing the modification of tooth rows into plates used to crush hard-shelled organisms

The postorbital region of the skull (behind the eyes) is lengthened and expanded in this group to such a point that it is longer than the preorbital region (in front of the eyes). Although clevosaurs also had skulls which were largest in the postorbital region, they evolved such a feature through different means, namely the preorbital region being shortened. The upper temporal fenestrae (a pair of large holes on the top of the rear part of the skull) are long but fairly thin, a feature also known in Vadasaurus and Palaeopleurosaurus, potential relatives of the group. Each upper temporal arch, which separates the upper temporal fenestrae from the lower temporal fenestrae (on the sides of the skull), is broad. Sapheosaurs, like other sphenodonts, had acrodont teeth which grew directly from the bone and could not be replaced. Historically Sapheosaurus was thought to be toothless. However, it was later shown that Sapheosaurus and Oenosaurus possessed tooth plates on the upper and lower jaws, formed by the fusion of maxillary and dentary teeth. Tooth plates are now thought to be characteristic of all sapheosaurs. They are thought to have been used for crushing hard shelled organisms (durophagy).

=== Other features ===
The centra (main body) of each caudal (tail) vertebra is flattened from the side in sapheosaurs. Sapheosaur vertebrae also had swollen neural arches (the area above the spinal cord) and zygapophyses (connecting joint plates), features also present in Ankylosphenodon. Some have proposed that sapheosaurs were at least partially aquatic due to some similarities and/or possible close relations to Ankylosphenodon (now believed to be convergently evolved) or Vadasaurus and pleurosaurs. However, they do not share many of the adaptations that these other taxa possess, and some researchers are not convinced by this hypothesis.
