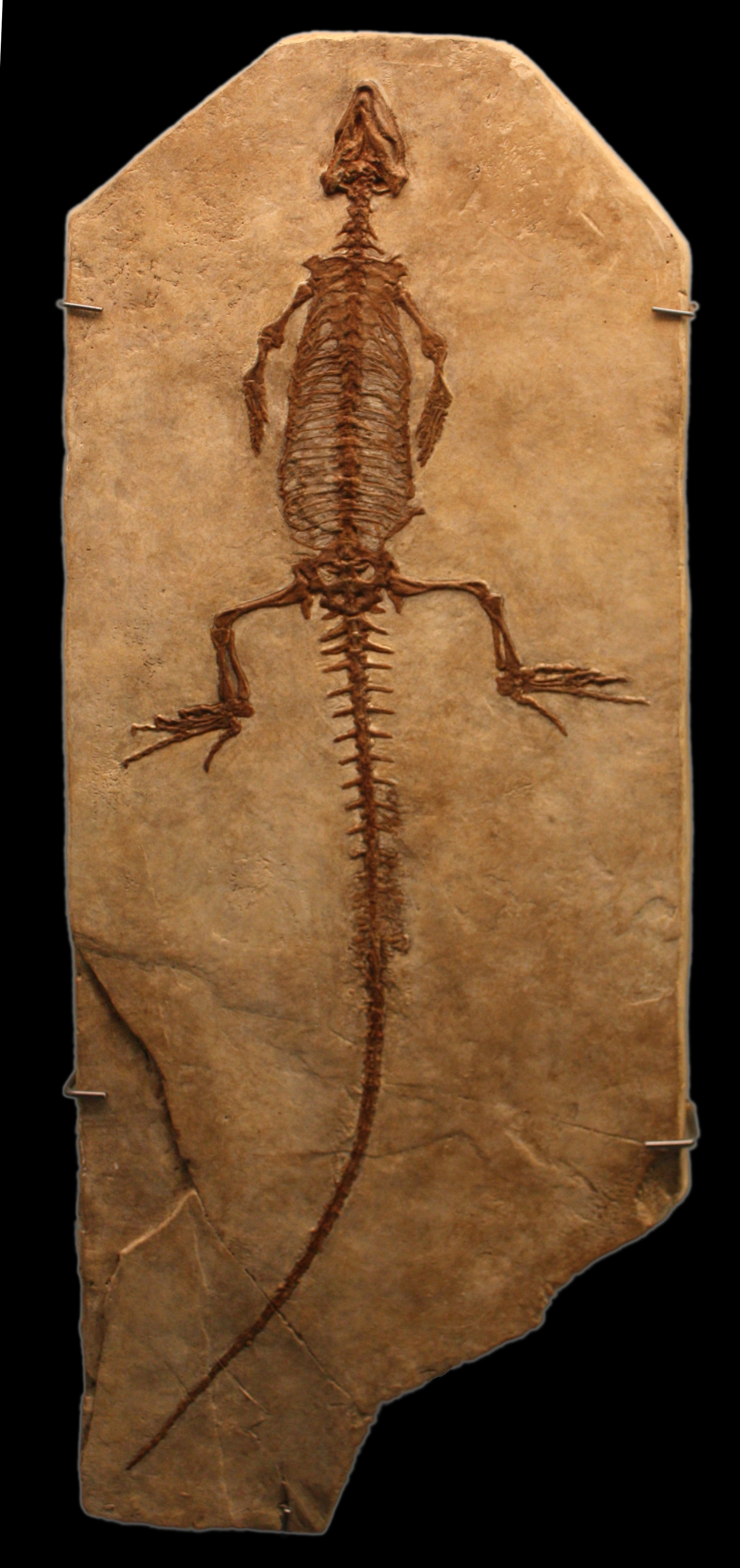
- Sapheosaurus thiollierei

Scientific classification
- Domain: Eukaryota
- Kingdom: Animalia
- Phylum: Chordata
- Class: Reptilia
- Order: Rhynchocephalia
- Family: †Sapheosauridae
- Genus: †Sapheosaurus

Species
- †S. thiollierei Meyer, 1850; †S. laticeps Wagner

= Sapheosaurus =

Sapheosaurus Temporal range: Late JurassicKimmeridgian

Extinct genus of reptiles

Sapheosaurus is an extinct genus of Late Jurassic sphenodont. Its skull was longer and narrower than that of Homoeosaurus. It was classified as a genus of sapheosaur by Michael Benton in 1985. It reached a length of 70 cm from snout to tail. Sapheosaurus belongs to the clade Sapheosauridae, that also includes other taxa like Kallimodon. It is believed to be one of two aquatic sphenodont lineages, with Pleurosauridae being the other.

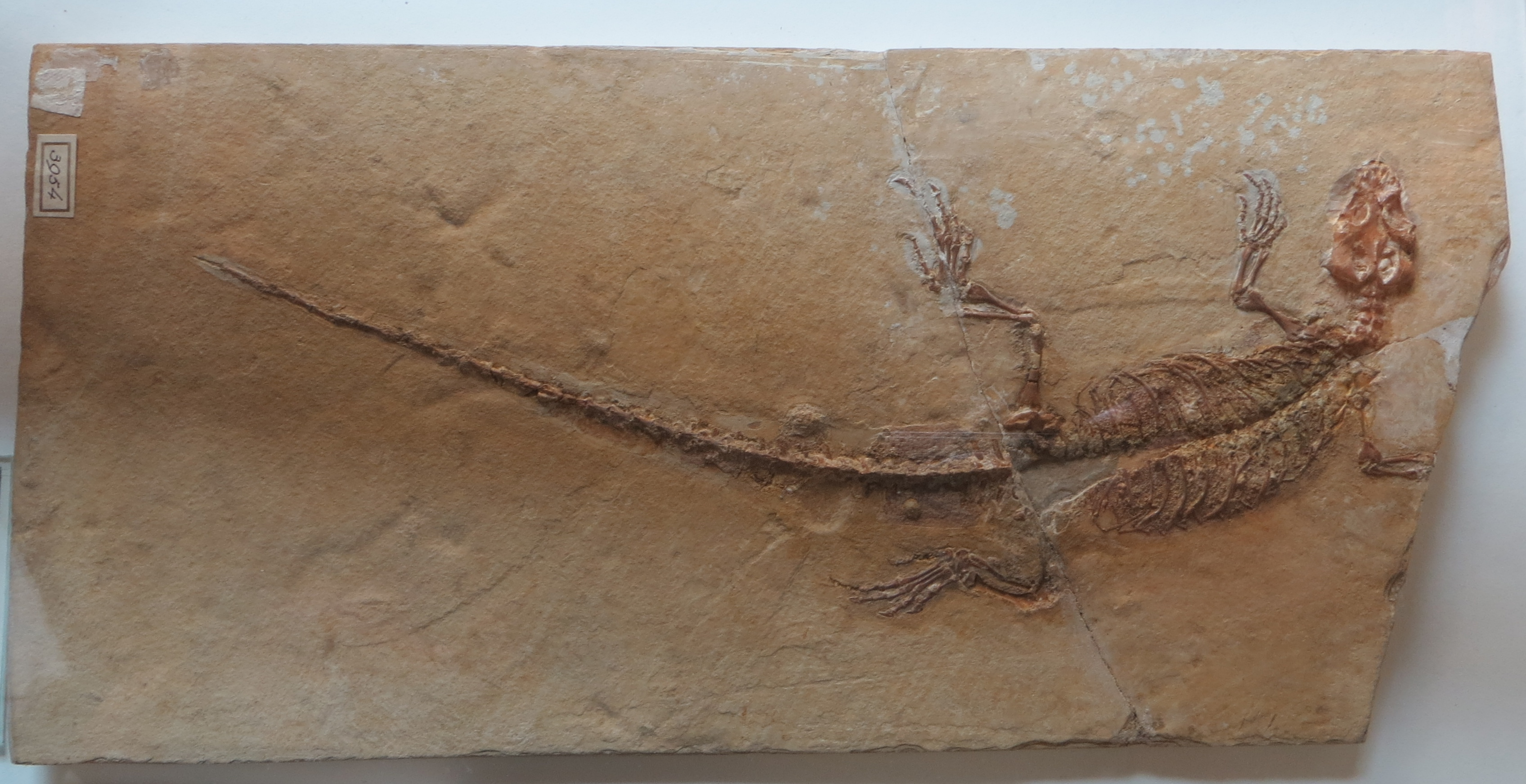
TMH 3954, the holotype of S. laticeps (=Piocormus laticeps)

== Species ==
Sapheosaurus laticeps (also known as Piocormus) differed from Sapheosaurus thiollierei by its smaller size and more vertebrae. S. thiollierei had 22 back and neck vertebrae, while S. laticeps had 26. Also, the two differ in relative limb length. S. laticeps lived in France and Germany.
