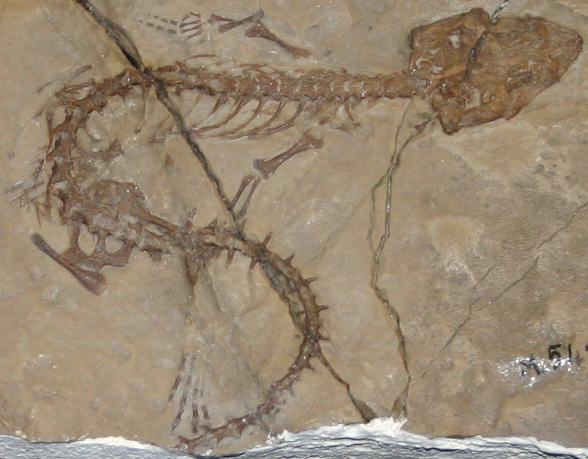

Scientific classification
- Kingdom: Animalia
- Phylum: Chordata
- Class: Reptilia
- Order: Rhynchocephalia
- Suborder: Sphenodontia
- Clade: Neosphenodontia
- Genus: †Derasmosaurus; Barbera and Macuglia, 1988
- Species: †D. pietrarojae

Binomial name
- †Derasmosaurus pietrarojae Barbera and Macuglia, 1988

= Derasmosaurus =

Derasmosaurus Temporal range: Albian

Extinct genus of reptiles

Derasmosaurus is an extinct monotypic genus of rhynchocephalian known from the Early Cretaceous (Albian) aged Pietraroja Plattenkalk of Italy. The only species in the genus is Derasmosaurus pietrarojae. It was originally considered to be a specimen of Lacerta brevicauda by Costa in 1866, it was later considered a specimen of the lizard Chometokadmon fitzingeri by D'Erasmo in 1915. It was described as a distinct rhynchocephalian genus in 1988. It is distinct from other indeterminate rhynchocephalians found in the Plattenkalk. It is considered to be aquatically adapted, and possibly a member of the Pleurosauridae.
