= Kawasphenodon =

Kawasphenodon Temporal range: Campanian-Danian (Tiupampan-Peligran) 72.1–66.1 Ma

Scientific classification
- Kingdom: Animalia
- Phylum: Chordata
- Class: Reptilia
- Order: Rhynchocephalia
- Suborder: Sphenodontia
- Infraorder: Eusphenodontia
- Clade: Neosphenodontia
- Family: Sphenodontidae
- Subfamily: Sphenodontinae
- Genus: †Kawasphenodon; Apesteguía, 2005

Type species
- Kawasphenodon expectatus Apesteguía, 2005

Other species
- Kawasphenodon peligrensis Apesteguía et al., 2014

Extinct genus of reptiles

Kawasphenodon is an extinct genus of sphenodontian reptile, known from the Late Cretaceous and Paleocene of Patagonia in South America. The type species, K. expectatus, was described in 2005 from jaw fragments found in late Campanian aged sediments in the Los Alamitos Formation, the jaw when complete was estimated to be 11 cm long, making it among the largest known sphenodontians. A second species, K. peligrensis, around 1/3 the size of the type species, was described in 2014 also from jaw fragments in early Paleocene (Danian) sediments of the Salamanca Formation, making it the youngest known definitive representative of Rhynchocephalia outside of New Zealand. In the original description, it was found to be a member of Sphenodontidae, in some other subsequent analyses it was found to be a member of Opisthodontia. A 2020 analysis of rhyncocephalian relationships found it to be outside Opisthodontia, and instead a member of the Sphenodontinae as the closest known relative of the tuatara, with an estimated divergence between the two genera in the Early Cretaceous. Other subsequent studies have endorsed its placement as a member of Sphenodontidae. Like most other rhynchocephalians, the teeth are acrodont, with a deep dentary, and it probably had an omnivorous habit.
