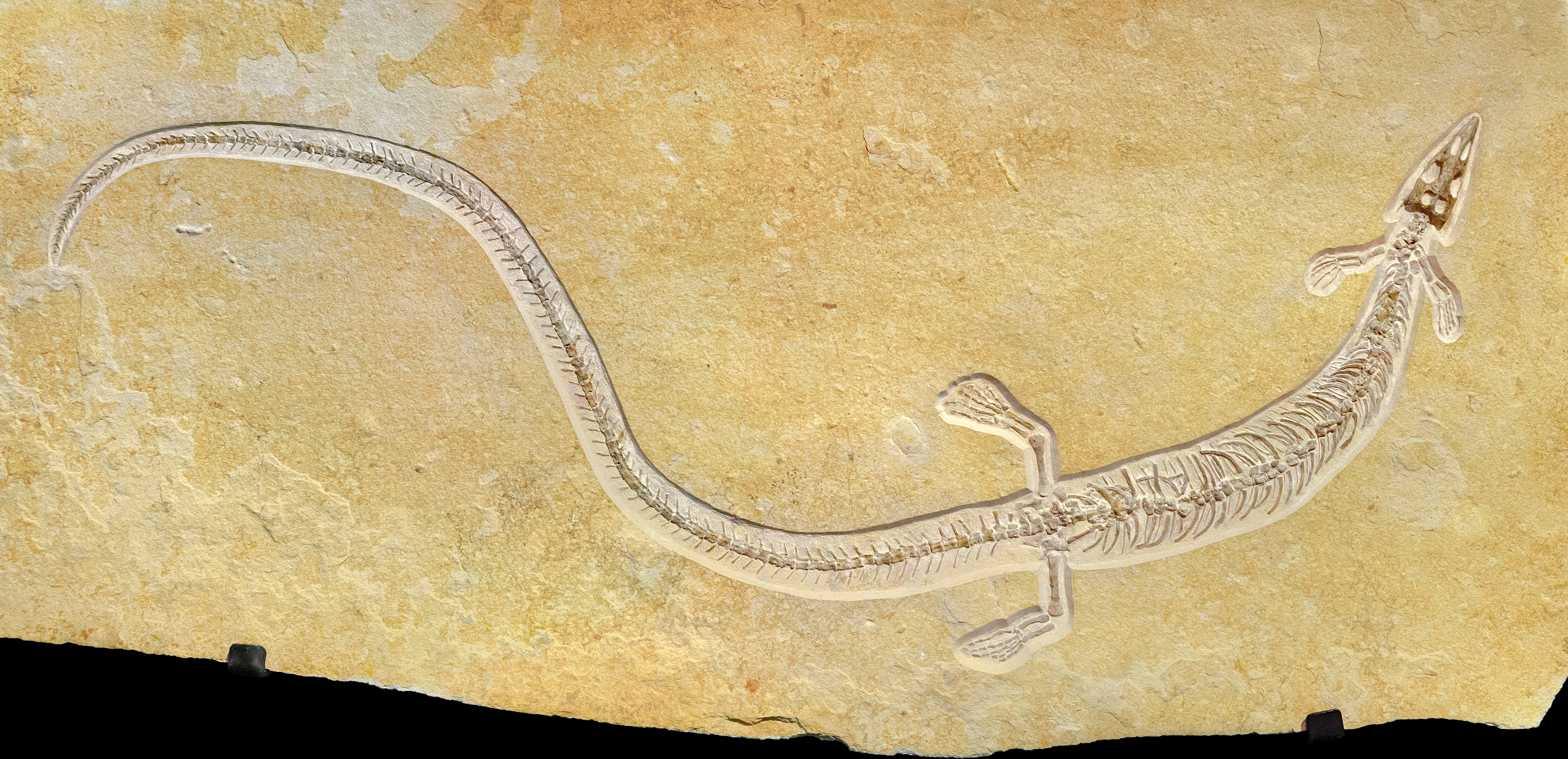
- P. sp., National Taiwan Museum
- Skull diagram

Scientific classification
- Kingdom: Animalia
- Phylum: Chordata
- Class: Reptilia
- Order: Rhynchocephalia
- Family: †Pleurosauridae
- Genus: †Pleurosaurus; Meyer, 1831

Type species
- †Pleurosaurus goldfussi Meyer, 1831

Species
- †P. goldfussi Meyer, 1831; †P. ginsburgi Fabre, 1974

Synonyms
- †Acrosaurus frischmanni? Von Meyer, 1854

= Pleurosaurus =

Pleurosaurus Temporal range: Late Jurassic, 152–150.8 Ma

Extinct genus of reptiles

Pleurosaurus, from Ancient Greek πλευρά (pleurá), meaning "rib" or "side", and σαυρος (sauros), meaning "lizard", is an extinct genus of aquatic reptiles belonging to the order Rhynchocephalia. Pleurosaurus fossils have primarily been discovered in the Solnhofen Limestone of Bavaria, Germany and the Canjuers lagerstatte near Canjuers, France, both dating to the Late Jurassic. It contains two species, P. goldfussi and P. ginsburgi.

== History of discovery ==
Pleurosaurus was first described from the Solnhofen Limestone by Christian Erich Hermann von Meyer in 1834, based on the species Pleurosaurus goldfussi. In 1970 fossils were reported from the lithographic limestones in a quarry near the village of Aiguines in the Canjuers plateau, France. In 1974, Pleurosaurus ginsburgi was described based on MNHN 1983-4-CNJ 67, a mostly complete skeleton found at the Aiguines quarry. Pleurosaurus is one of two unambiguous members of the family Pleurosauridae, alongside Palaeopleurosaurus from the Early Jurassic of Germany. In 2012, fragmentary remains likely belonging to P. goldfussi were reported from central Poland. Acrosaurus frischmanni has long been considered a junior synonym of Pleurosaurus due to its very similar anatomy, though analysis suggesting that it is morphologically mature despite being much smaller than adult Pleurosaurus individuals suggests that it may be valid.

== Description ==
Pleurosaurus is one of the few known aquatic sphenodontians. It reached a maximum body length of 1.5 metres (4.9 ft). The body and especially the tail were elongated, while the limbs were comparatively short. The elongated triangular skull was highly modified from those present in other rhynchocephalians Pleurosaurus goldfussi and Pleurosaurus ginsburgi are distinguished by differing skull proportions, different numbers of presacral vertebrae (50 in P. goldfussi vs 57 in P. ginsburgi), and considerably shorter forelimbs on P. ginsburgi. The neural spines of the vertebrae were relatively square, about as long as tall. The number of tail vertebrae reached 118 in some individuals of Pleurosaurus ginsburgi. Unlike the living tuatara, the scapula and coracoid did not fuse to each other. Also unlike the living tuatara, Pleurosaurus did not have fracture planes in its tail vertebrae to allow for caudal autotomy.

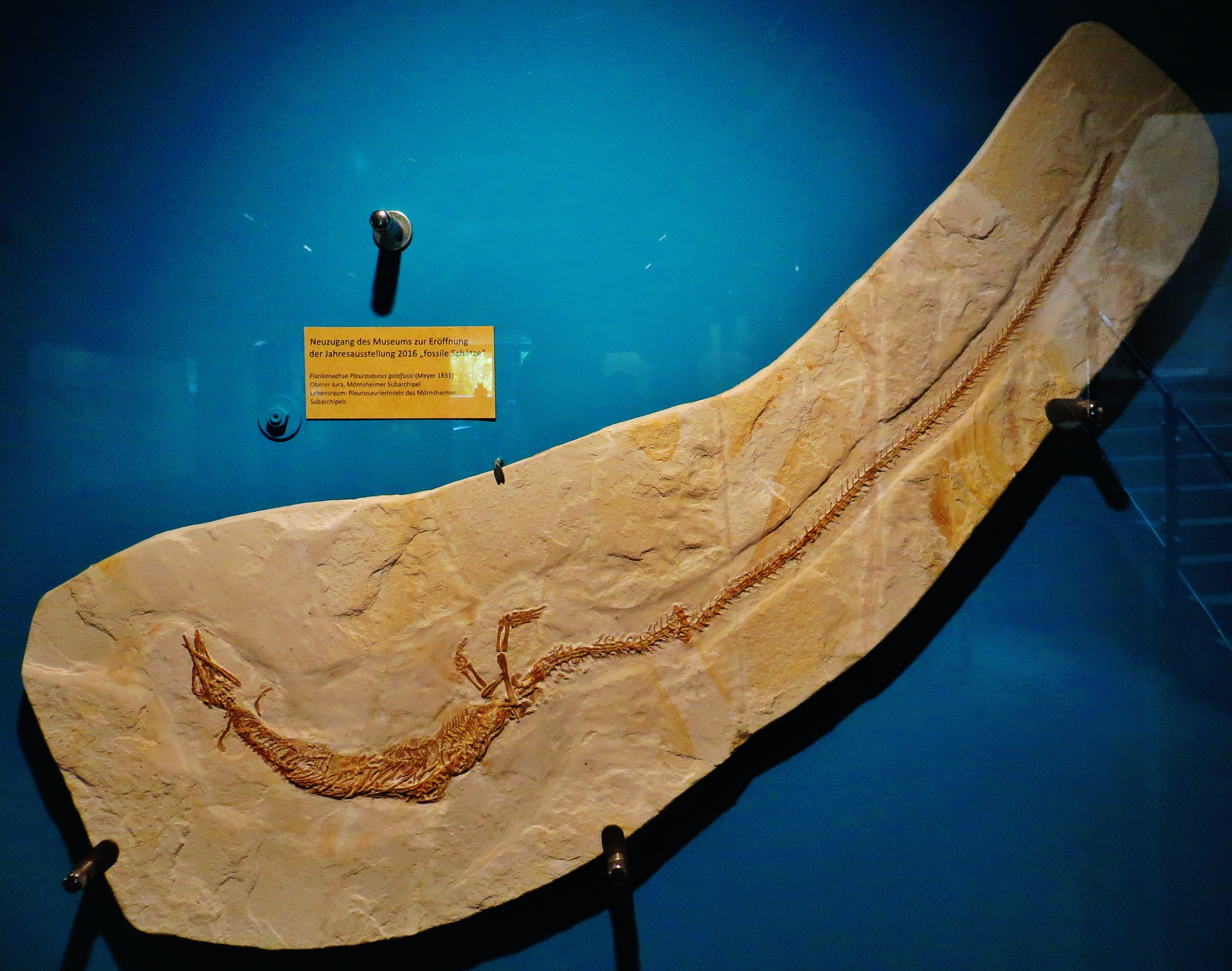
P. goldfussi

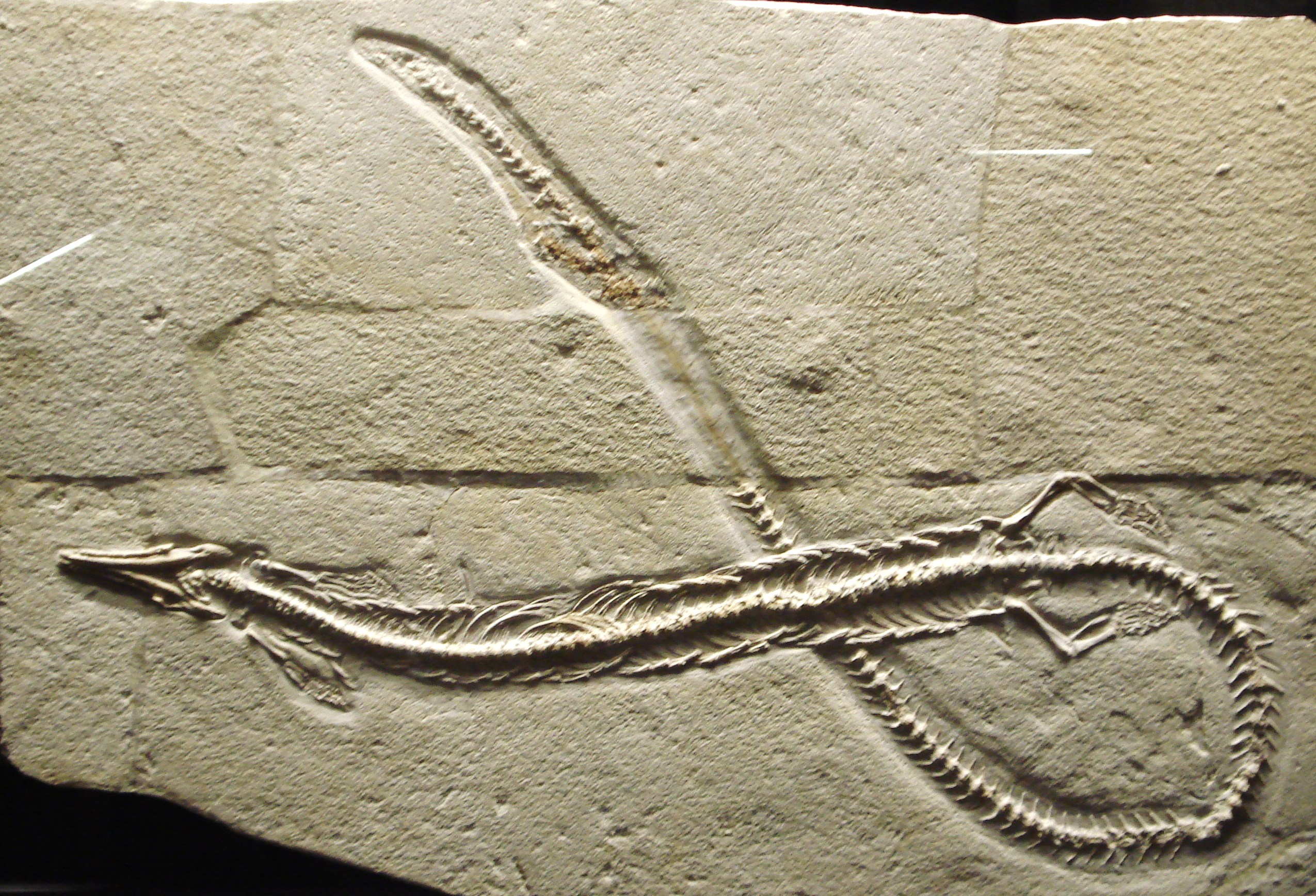
P. goldfussi

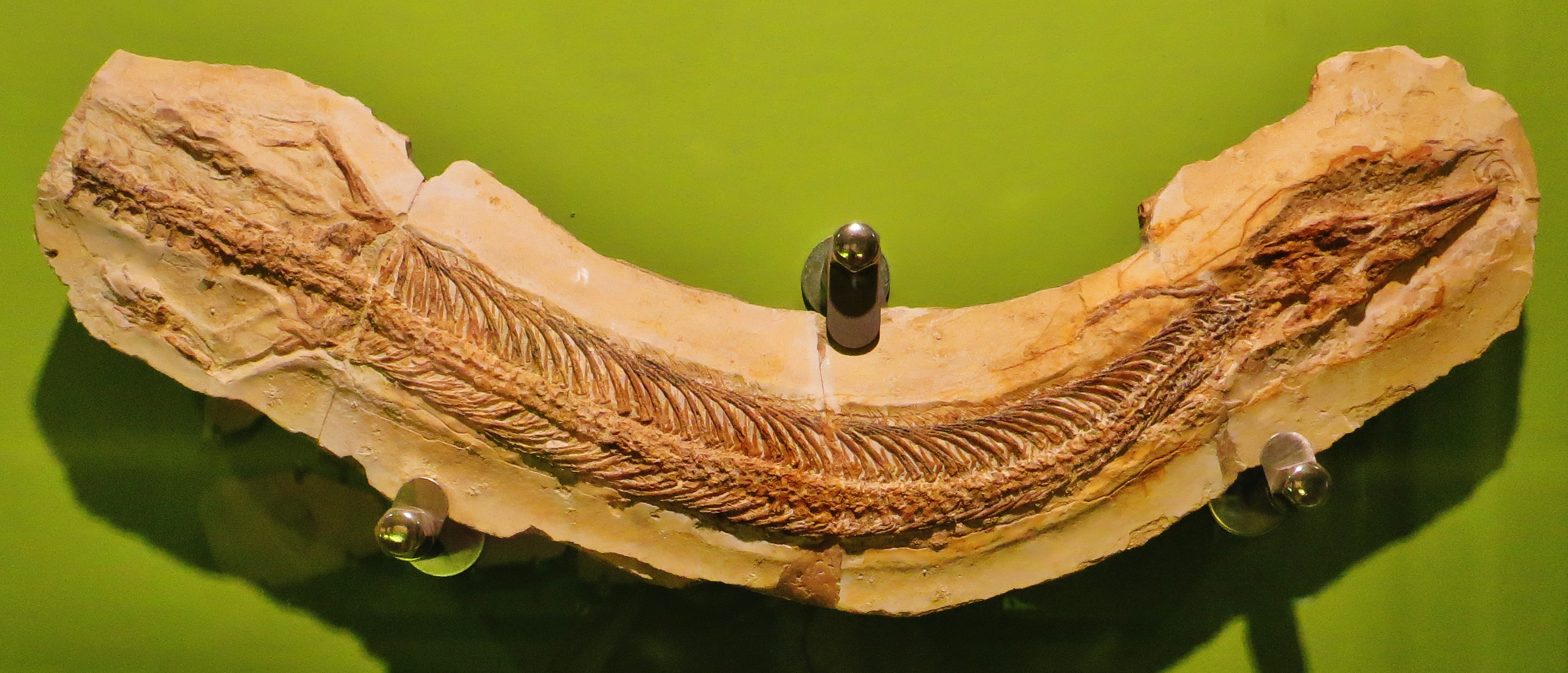
P. ginsburgi

== Paleobiology ==
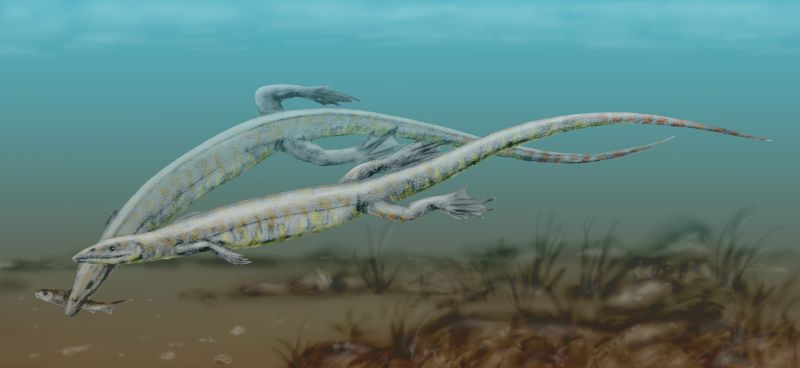
Restoration of Pleurosaurus goldfussi

Pleurosaurus swam via undulating its tail from side to side (anguilliform locomotion), while it probably used its limbs to steer. It lived in shallow marine environments, and was probably piscivorous.
