= Sphenotitan =

Sphenotitan Temporal range: Late Triassic Norian
- Skull diagram

Scientific classification
- Kingdom: Animalia
- Phylum: Chordata
- Class: Reptilia
- Order: Rhynchocephalia
- Subfamily: †Eilenodontinae
- Genus: †Sphenotitan; Martínez et al., 2013

Type species
- †Sphenotitan leyesi Martínez et al., 2013

Extinct genus of reptiles

Sphenotitan is an extinct genus of rhynchocephalian reptile, known from the Late Triassic (Norian) Quebrada del Barro Formation of Argentina. It is the earliest known member of the herbivorous Eilenodontinae, and the only one known from the Triassic. It was a large-sized sphenodontian, with an estimated skull length of over 10 centimetres (3.9 in). The skull is roughly triangular in shape, and had large upper temporal fenestrae. The region of the skull in front of the eye socket (preoribital region) is short. The premaxillae form a beak, with a cutting edge similar to a chisel. The teeth of Sphenotitan, like other eilenodontines, were large and wide, and designed for shredding vegetation, with blade-like palatal teeth on the roof of the mouth.
