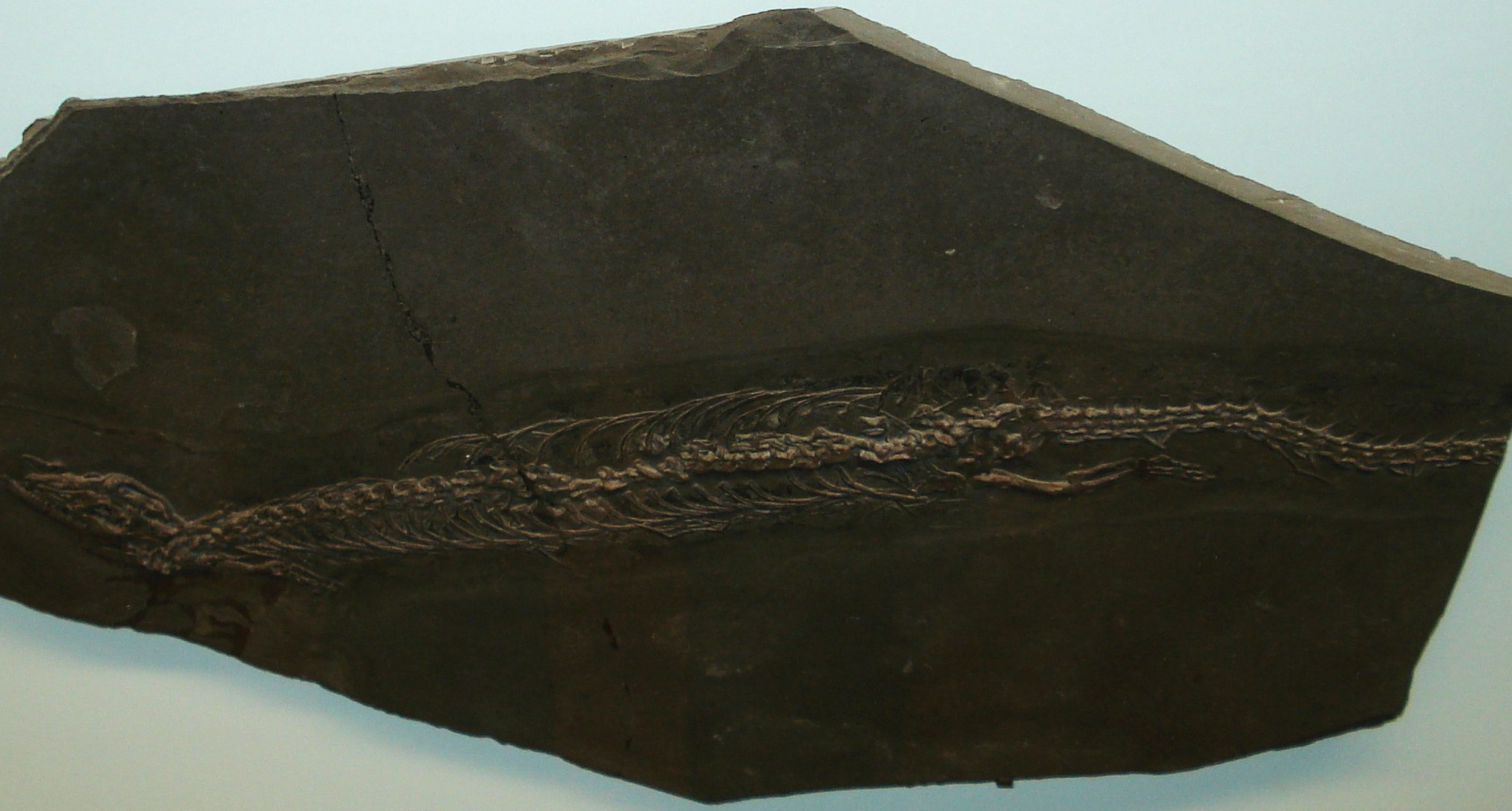
- Fossil specimen

Scientific classification
- Domain: Eukaryota
- Kingdom: Animalia
- Phylum: Chordata
- Class: Reptilia
- Order: Rhynchocephalia
- Family: †Pleurosauridae
- Genus: †Palaeopleurosaurus; Carroll, 1985
- Species: †P. posidoniae

Binomial name
- †Palaeopleurosaurus posidoniae Carroll, 1985

= Palaeopleurosaurus =

Palaeopleurosaurus Temporal range: Early Toarcian, 181 Ma

Extinct genus of reptiles

Restoration of the skull in lateral and dorsal view

Palaeopleurosaurus (meaning "old side lizard") is an extinct genus of diapsid reptiles belonging to the group Sphenodontia.

Palaeopleurosaurus fossils were discovered in Germany (Holzmaden and Kerkhofen) from the Lower Toarcian (Early Jurassic), Posidonia Shale, dated to about 182-180 million years ago. The holotype come from the Middle Section, just under the Seagrasschiefer section (=Bifrons subzone) on both localities, probably linked with the coeval measured sea regression. Initially, Paleopleurosaurus was described to represent an intermediate morphology between Late Triassic-Lower Jurassic terrestrial sphenodontia and the late Jurassic fully aquatic Pleurosaurus. The study of a new specimen provided additional information, corroborating the existence of an early lineage of elongated sphenodontians, although with retained characters of terrestrial genera such as Kallimodon.

== Paleobiology ==
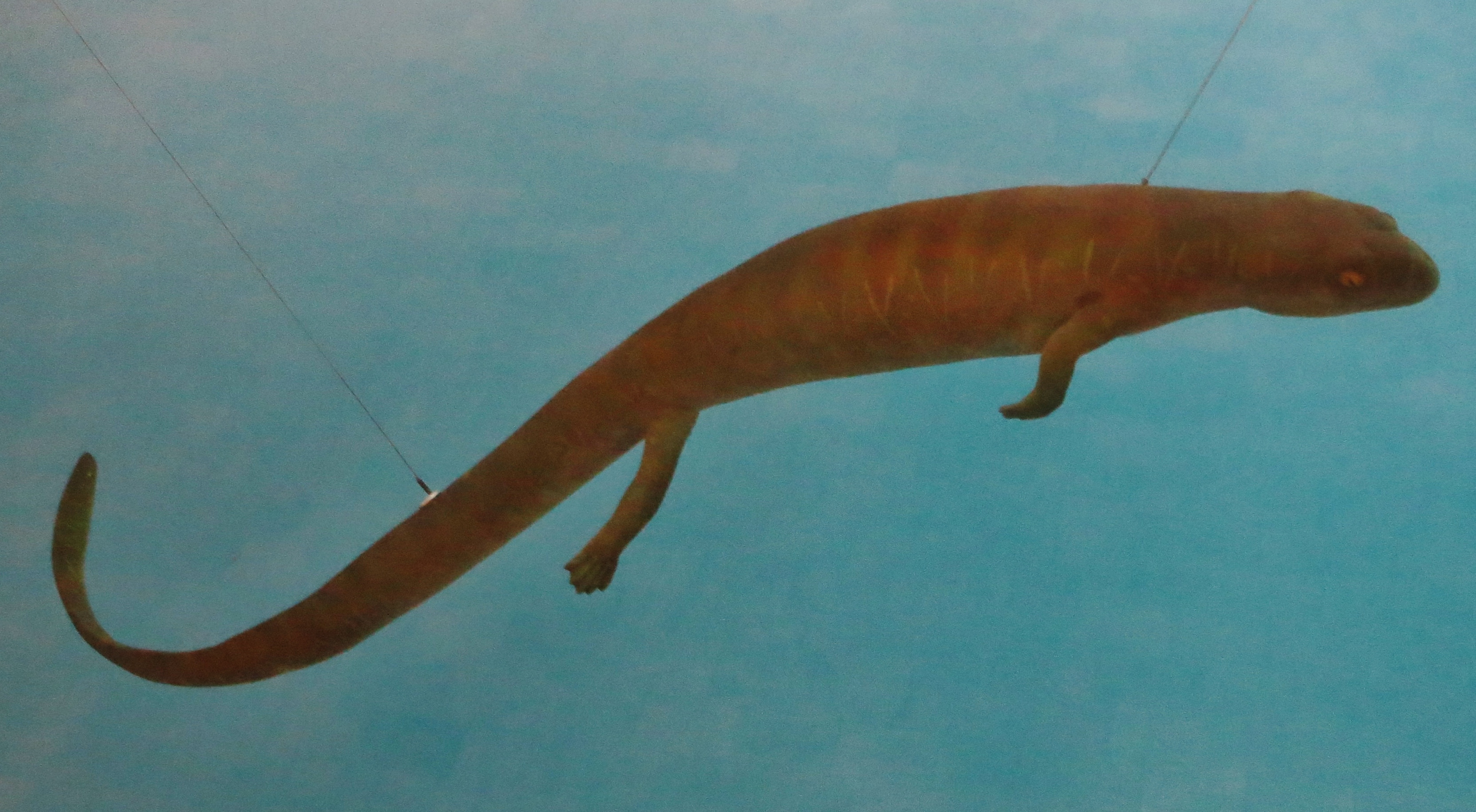
Model

Palaeopleurosaurus evidences that there was a slightly skeletal specialization for an aquatic lifestyle, achieved through the Jurassic gradually on pleurosaurs, a lifestyle supported by increased bone density in its gastralia. It has similarities with other marine reptiles, such with members of Sauropterygia the presence of a defined suture between the centrum and the neural arch, along with reducted sternum. However, the lack of increase in rib and femur bone density suggests that the lineage of Palaeopleurosaurus became gradually adapted to aquatic lifestyles, not as adapted as Pleurosaurus, as show limited morphological evidence of adaptation to a complete aquatic lifestyle, defined by no Osteosclerosis and the lack of Pachyostosis, except for a thicker shaft region in the humerus, that is as narrow as in terrestrial rhynchocephalians, such as the terrestrial Clevosaurus. Palaeopleurosaurus probably was still able to walk on land, for example for Oviposition. Recent studies suggest a shorter lifespan than modern Tuatara, based on irregular spacing of growth marks. Histology shows that the number of growth rings in Palaeopleurosaurus was smaller than the living tuatara, possibly indicating a shorter lifespan.
