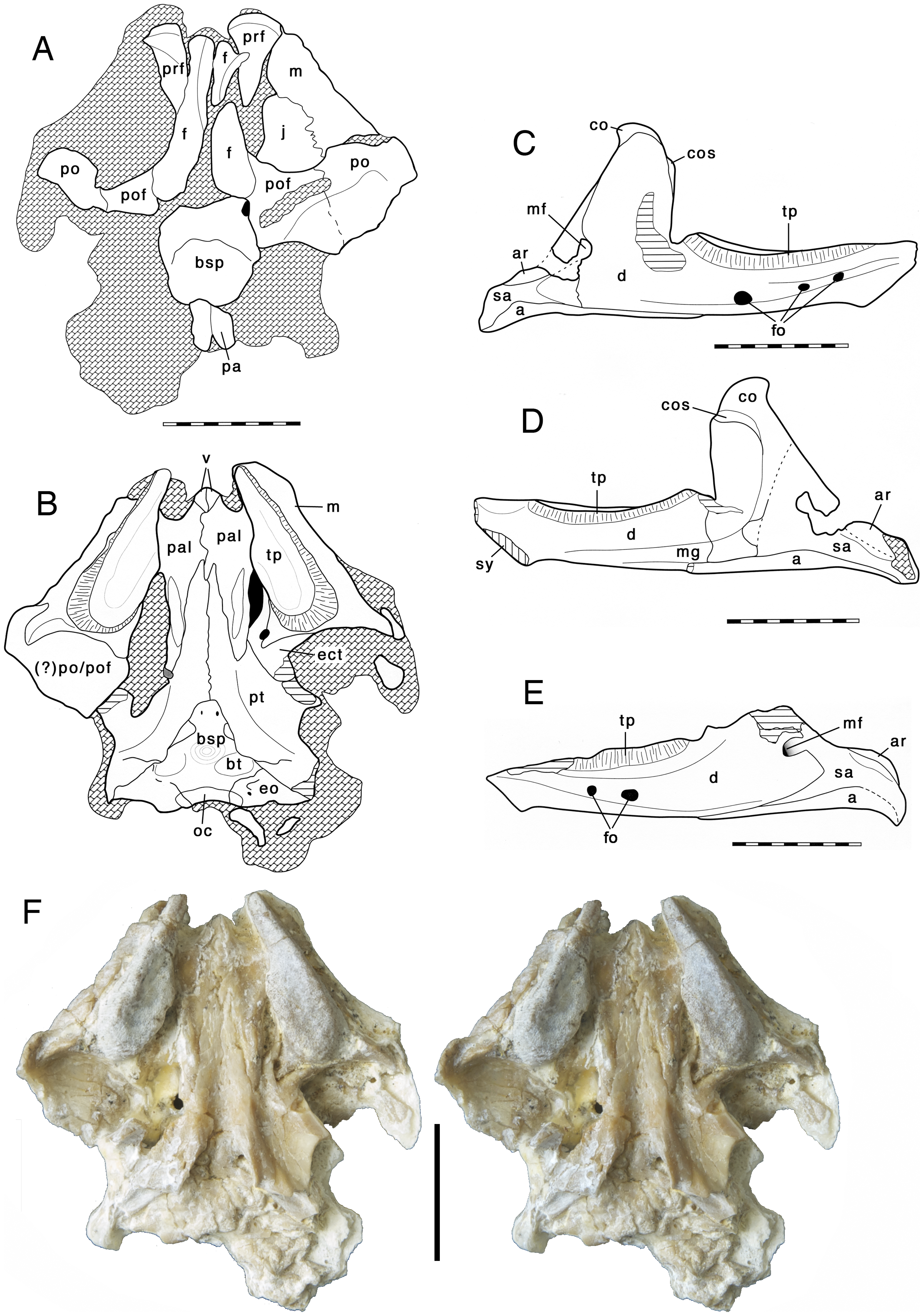
- Holotype skull in multiple views

Scientific classification
- Kingdom: Animalia
- Phylum: Chordata
- Class: Reptilia
- Order: Rhynchocephalia
- Suborder: Sphenodontia
- Family: †Sapheosauridae
- Genus: †Oenosaurus; Rauhut et al., 2012

Type species
- †Oenosaurus muehlheimensis Rauhut et al., 2012

= Oenosaurus =

Oenosaurus Temporal range: Tithonian

Extinct genus of reptiles

Oenosaurus is an extinct genus of sphenodontian reptile from the Late Jurassic (Tithonian) aged Mörnsheim Formation of Germany.

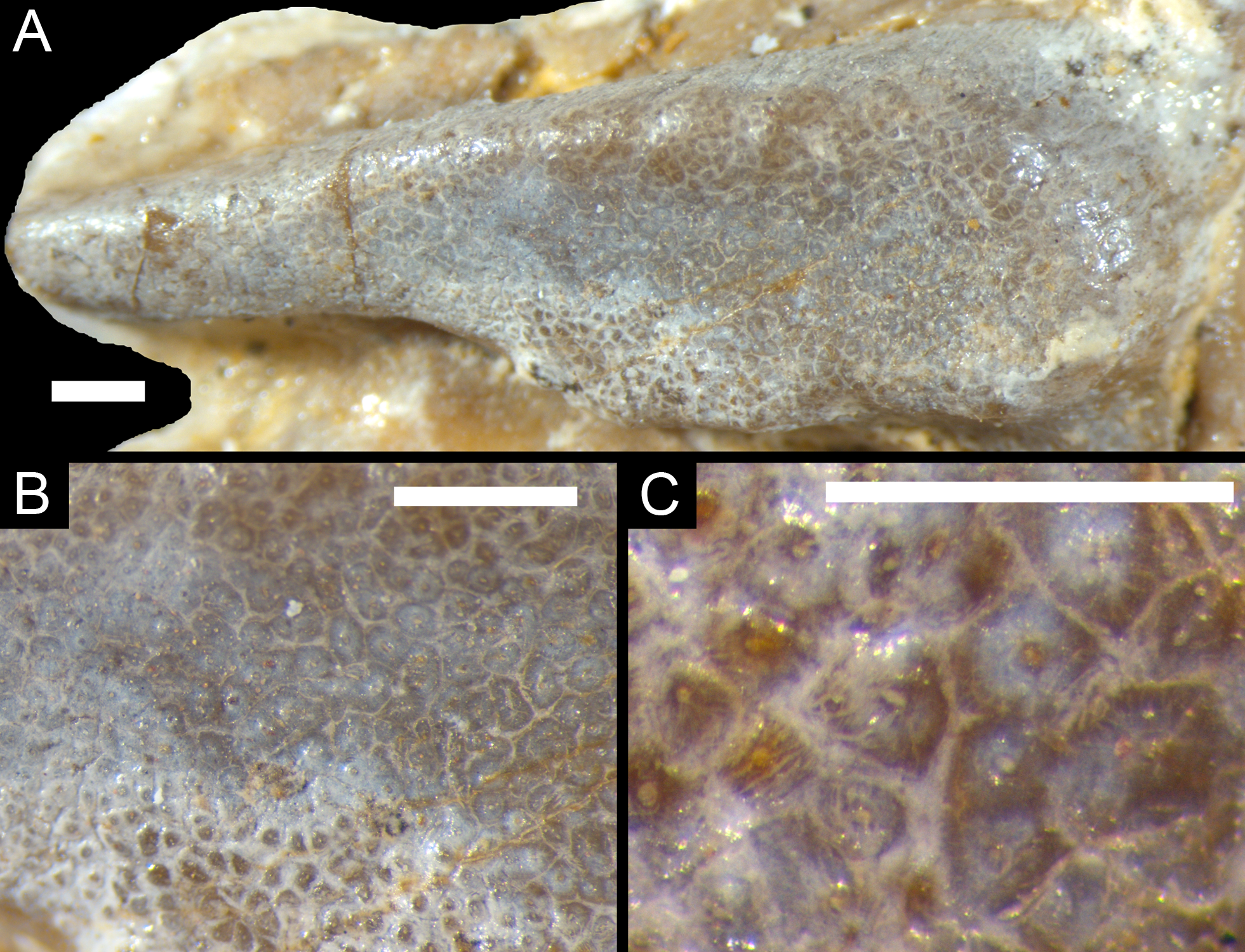
Close up of tooth plate

== Description ==
The genus is known from a partial skull preserved in ventral view. The teeth in the upper and lower jaws were fused into tooth plates.

== Diet and lifestyle ==
It is likely that Oenosaurus led a durophagous lifestyle as indicated by the broad tooth plates. It is unknown if this animal was aquatic or terrestrial.

== Phylogeny ==
It is currently considered to be a sapheosaur.
