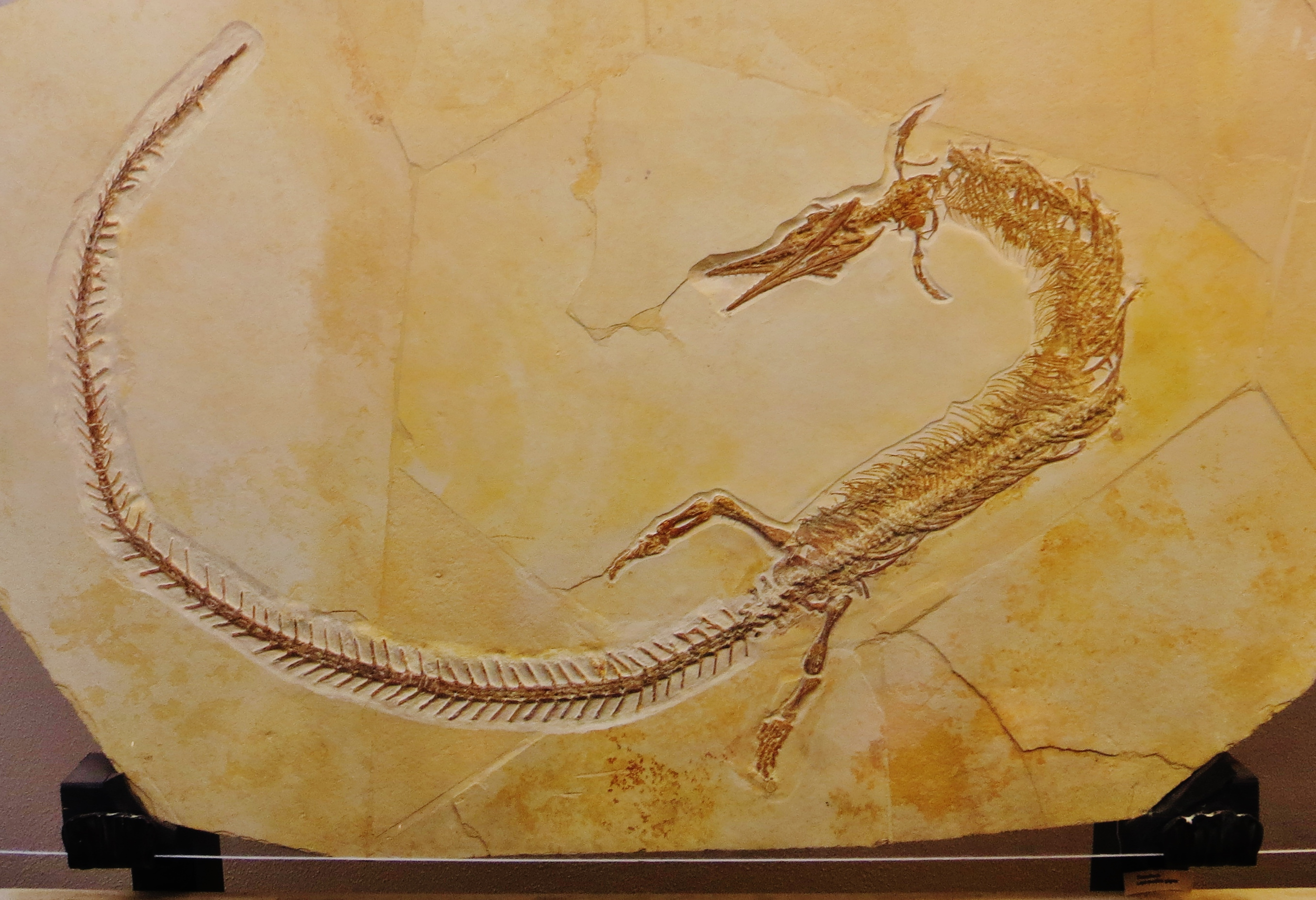
- Fossil of Pleurosaurus
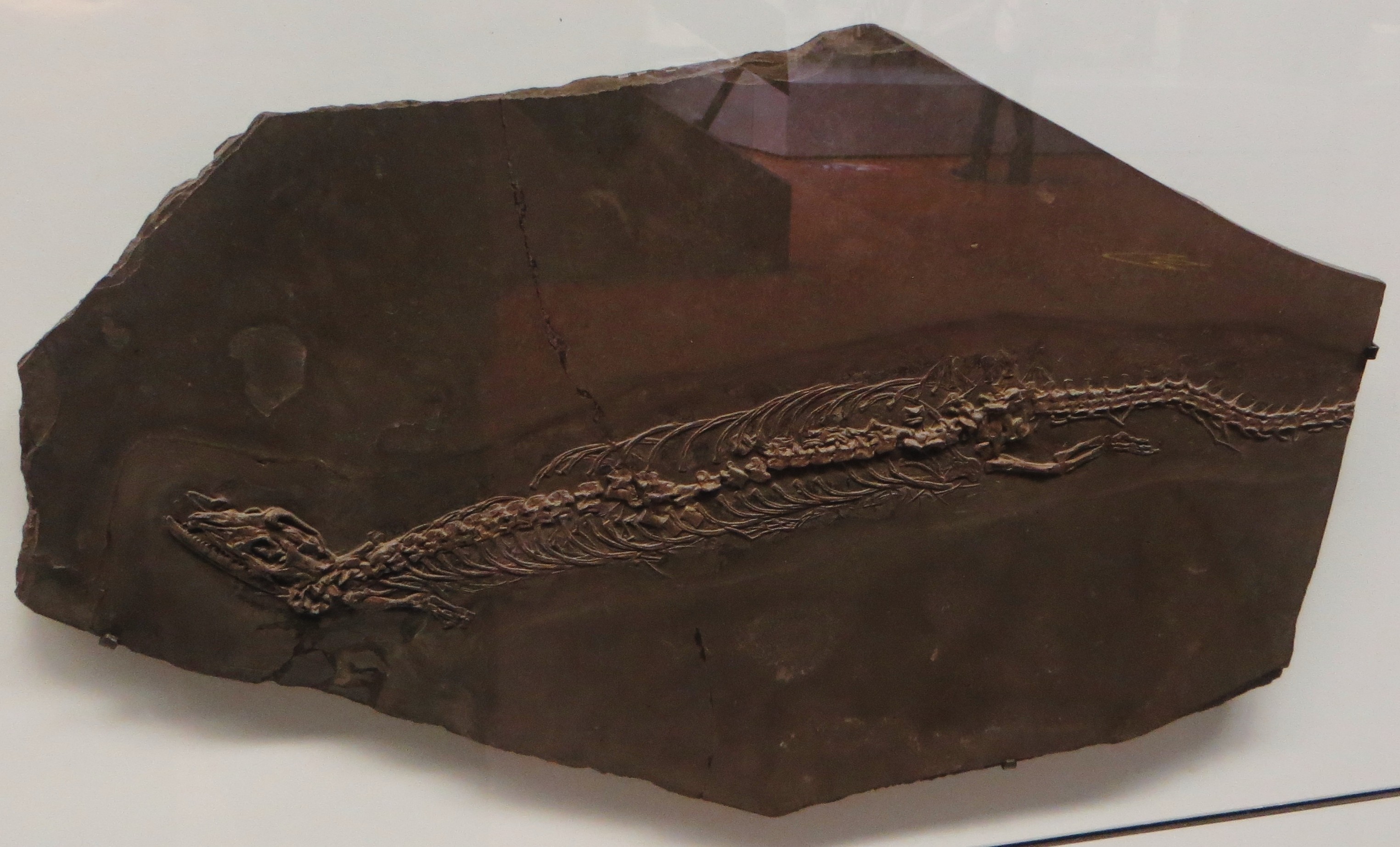
- Fossil of Palaeopleurosaurus

Scientific classification
- Kingdom: Animalia
- Phylum: Chordata
- Class: Reptilia
- Order: Rhynchocephalia
- Suborder: Sphenodontia
- Family: †Pleurosauridae; Lydekker, 1888

Genera
- †Palaeopleurosaurus; †Pleurosaurus; †?Derasmosaurus; †?Vadasaurus; †?Ankylosphenodon

= Pleurosauridae =

Pleurosauridae Temporal range: Early Jurassic - Late Jurassic, 183–145 Ma

Family of extinct reptiles

Pleurosauridae, from Ancient Greek πλευρά (pleurá), meaning "rib" or "side", and σαῦρος (saûros), meaning "lizard", is an extinct family of sphenodontian reptiles, known from the Jurassic of Europe. Members of the family had long snake-like bodies with reduced limbs that were adapted for aquatic life in marine environments. It contains two genera, Palaeopleurosaurus, which is known from the Early Jurassic (Toarcian) Posidonia Shale of Germany, as well as Pleurosaurus from the Late Jurassic of Germany and France. Paleopleurosaurus is more primitive than the later Pleurosaurus, with a skull similar to those of other sphenodontians, while that of Pleurosaurus is highly modified relative to other sphenodontians. They likely swam via anguilliform locomotion. Vadasaurus and Derasmosaurus from the Late Jurassic and Early Cretaceous of Europe have been placed as part of this family in some studies, but lack the body elongation that typifies the other two genera.
