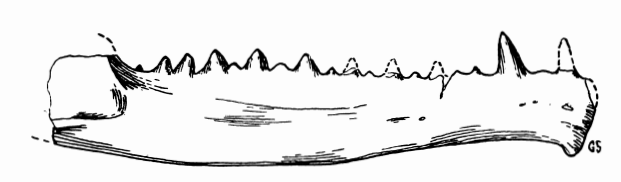
- Illustration of the Theretairus antiquus holotype mandible.

Scientific classification
- Kingdom: Animalia
- Phylum: Chordata
- Class: Reptilia
- Order: Rhynchocephalia
- Suborder: Sphenodontia
- Genus: †Theretairus

Type species
- †Theretairus antiquus Simpson, 1926

= Theretairus =

Theretairus Temporal range: Late Jurassic

Extinct genus of reptiles

Theretairus is a Late Jurassic genus of sphenodont reptile from the Morrison Formation of western North America, present in stratigraphic zones 5 and 6.

== History and naming ==
The holotype consists of a right mandible and several in-socket teeth from Quarry 9 at Como Bluff, Wyoming where it was excavated by paleontologist William Harlow Reed, who then was working for Othniel Charles Marsh, and it was deposited at the Yale Peabody Museum under YPM VP 13764. The locality comes from strata of the Brushy Basin Member of the Morrison Formation, which also bears other sphenodontians Opisthias and Eilenodon. It was not named until George Gaylord Simpson described it as a new genus and species in a 1926 paper in the American Journal of Science. The generic name means "mammal companion", due to its association with the jaws of mammals in the Como Bluff quarry, and the specific name means "ancient", due to its old age as a sphenodontian.

== Description and classification ==
The type specimen preserves a very strange morphology, with masseteric fossae in the posterior end similar to those in mammals. The teeth progressively get larger as they get closer to the anterior end, a trait also similar to mammals. Recently, the symphysis and two (perhaps three) enlarged acrodont fangs at the anterior end of the jaw, but separated one from the other to a lesser degree of the type have linked the taxon to the Mexican taxon Sphenovipera. The anterior border of the symphysis is steeply inclined in the holotype of Theretarius, suggesting it is an adult or older individual. Theretarius preserves five fossae along the posterior end of the mandible, making the mandible lighter, a trait only shared with Sphenovipera.

The following is a cladogram of Rhynchocephalia after DeMar et al. 2022.

- - Younginia capensis
  - Prolacerta broomi
  - Lepidosauria
    - Pan-Squamata
      - Sophineta cracoviensis
      - Pristidactylus
      - Eichstaettisaurus schroederi
      - - Megachirella wachtleri
        - Marmoretta oxoniensis
    - Rhynchocephalia
      - Gephyrosaurus bridensis
      - Sphenodontia
        - Diphydontosaurus avonis
        - Acrosphenodontia
          - Planocephalosaurus robinsonae
          - - Rebbanasaurus jaini
            - - - Godavarisaurus lateefi
                - Theretairus antiquus
              - Eusphenodontia
                - Polysphenodon mulleri
                - - Opisthiamimus gregori
                  - - Clevosauridae
                      - - Clevosaurus convallis
                        - - Clevosaurus brasiliensis
                          - Clevosaurus hadroprodon
                      - - Clevosaurus bairdi
                        - - Clevosaurus hudsoni
                          - Clevosaurus cambrica
                    - Neosphenodontia
                      - Brachyrhinodon taylori
                      - - Colobops noviportensis
                        - - Sphenodontidae
                            - Sphenodon punctatus (tuatara)
                            - Cynosphenodon huizachalensis
                            - Sphenovipera jimmysjoyi
                            - - Kawasphenodon expectatus
                              - Kawasphenodon peligrensis
                            - Pelecymala robustus
                            - Eilenodontinae
                              - - Fraserosphenodon latidens
                                - Opisthias rarus
                              - - Eilenodon robustus
                                - - Sphenotitan leyesi
                                  - - Toxolophosaurus cloudi
                                    - Priosphenodon avelasi
                          - Leptorhynchia
                            - - Homoeosaurus maximiliani
                              - Kallimodon pulchellus
                            - - - Sigmala sigmala
                                - Vadasaurus herzogi
                              - Pleurosauridae
                                - Palaeopleurosaurus posidonae
                                - - Pleurosaurus goldfussi
                                  - Pleurosaurus ginsburgi
                            - Kallimodon cerinensis
                            - Sapheosauridae
                              - Sapheosaurus thiollierei
                              - - Ankylosphenodon pachyostosus
                                - Oenosaurus muehlheimensis

== See also ==
- Prehistoric reptile
- Paleobiota of the Morrison Formation
