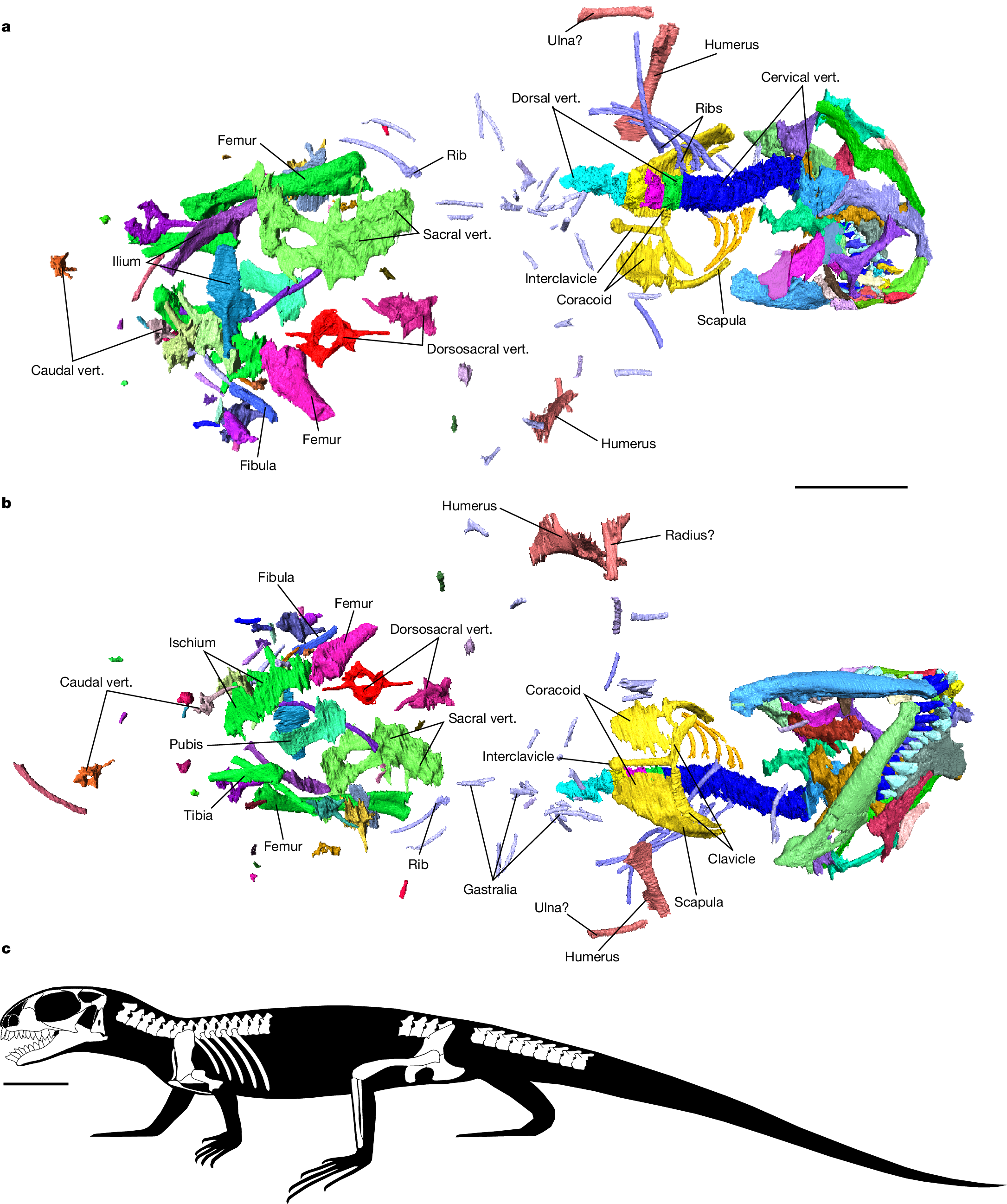
- Holotype specimen (a, b) and reconstructed skeleton (c)

Scientific classification
- Kingdom: Animalia
- Phylum: Chordata
- Class: Reptilia
- Order: Rhynchocephalia
- Suborder: Sphenodontia
- Clade: Acrosphenodontia
- Genus: †Agriodontosaurus; Marke et al., 2025
- Species: †A. helsbypetrae

Binomial name
- †Agriodontosaurus helsbypetrae Marke et al., 2025

= Agriodontosaurus =

Agriodontosaurus Temporal range: Middle Triassic (Anisian), ~244–241.5 Ma

Extinct reptile genus

Agriodontosaurus (File:Fierce-toothed lizard (edit | talk | history | links | watch | logs)) is an extinct genus of probable early rhynchocephalian reptile known from the Middle Triassic (Anisian age) Helsby Sandstone Formation of England. The genus contains a single species, Agriodontosaurus helsbypetrae, known from a partial skull and skeleton. It is the oldest known definitive rhynchocephalian and currently the oldest known member of Lepidosauria, the broader group including the modern tuatara (the only living rhynchocephalian) and snakes and lizards (Squamata).

== Discovery and naming ==
The Agriodontosaurus holotype specimen, BRSUG 29950-14, was discovered and excavated by Robert A. Coram in 2015 in a sandstone bed representing the Pennington Point Member of the Helsby Sandstone Formation in Sidmouth, Devon, South West England. Natural weathering had exposed part of the specimen's dorsal surface when it was collected, and later physical preparation was carried out to reveal more of the anatomy. The specimen, which remains fully contained in the sandstone block it was collected in, is well preserved and partially articulated. It comprises much of the mandible and skull, although it is distorted and missing the rostrum (snout region) and much of the right side, in addition to an articulated series of eight cervical (neck) vertebrae and the succeeding few dorsal (back) vertebrae, various disarticulated dorsosacral, sacral, and caudal (tail) vertebrae, a complete left pectoral girdle (scapula, coracoid, clavicles, and interclavicle) and parts of the right one, forelimb bones (both humeri and fragments possibly representing pieces of the radius and ulna), most of the pelvic girdle (ilia, pubes, and ischia from the left and/or right sides), and hindlimb bones (both femora, and part of a tibia and fibula).

In 2025, Marke and colleagues described Agriodontosaurus helsbypetrae as a new genus and species of early rhynchocephalians based on these fossil remains. The generic name, Agriodontosaurus, combines a reference to Agrionius ('fierce'), an Ancient Greek epithet of the god Dionysus, with the Greek words donto, meaning 'tooth', and σαῦρος (sauros), meaning 'lizard'. The specific name, helsbypetrae, references the discovery of the specimen in the Helsby Sandstone Formation, combined with the latinized Greek petra, meaning 'rock'.

== Description ==
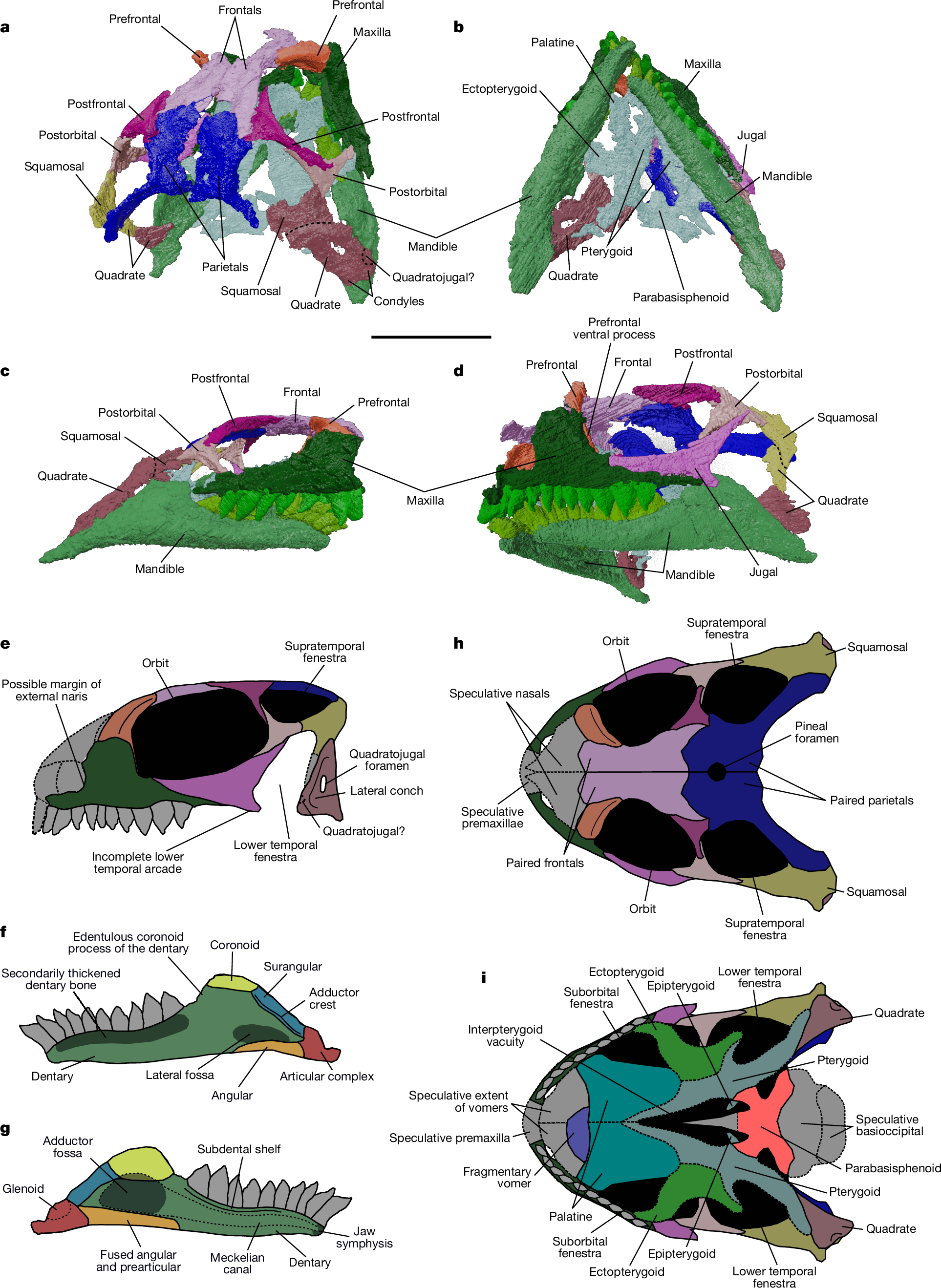
Holotype skull

Agriodontosaurus is one of the smallest known rhynchocephalians, with a body around 10 centimetres (3.9 in) long, and a skull around 1.5 centimetres (0.59 in) long. Agriodontosaurus has robust, conical teeth at the front of the upper and lower jaws, which become more triangular towards the posterior. The front teeth are acrodont (attached to the apex of the jaw), while the back teeth are pleuracrodont, fused to the jaw but on a residual shelf. Agriodontosaurus lacks a complete lower temporal bar connecting the jugal with the quadrate bone.

== Classification ==
To determine the affinities and relationships of Agriodontosaurus with other reptiles, Marke et al. (2025) scored this taxon into two phylogenetic matrices. In the dataset of Tałanda et al. (2022), broadly focused on reptiles with a broad sampling of squamates, Agriodontosaurus was recovered in an unresolved clade including Wirtembergia (the previous oldest-known rhynchocephalian), Clevosaurus hadroprodon, and Parvosaurus. This clade diverged after one comprising Diphydontosaurus and Gephyrosaurus. Using the dataset of Chambi-Trowell et al. (2021), which is more precisely focused on rhynchocephalians, Agriodontosaurus was found to occupy an early-diverging position within the Sphenodontia, again in a more derived position than Diphydontosaurus and Gephyrosaurus. Simplified results of this analysis, following the 50% majority tree, are displayed in the cladogram below:

- Rhynchocephalia
  - †Gephyrosaurus
  - - †Penegephyrosaurus
    - Sphenodontia
      - †Paleollanosaurus
      - †Vellbergia
      - †Diphydontosaurus
      - Acrosphenodontia
        - †Planocephalosaurus
        - - †Parvosaurus
          - - †Agriodontosaurus
            - - †Theretairus
              - †Sphenocondor
              - †Pamizinsaurus
              - - †Lanceirosphenodon
                - †Rebbanasaurus
              - - †Microsphenodon
                - Eusphenodontia
                  - †Clevosauridae
                  - Neosphenodontia
                    - Sphenodontidae
                    - †Leptorhynchia

In her 2026 review of lepidosaur relationships, Susan E. Evans described the rhynchocephalian affinities of Agriodontosaurus as "problematic", noting features of the shape, size, and implantation of the teeth that are inconsistent with members of this clade. Marke et al. (2025) described the palate of this taxon as lacking dentition, contrasting with the prominent palatine tooth row that characterizes rhynchocephalians.

== Ecology ==
Agriodontosaurus is suggested to have probably been an insectivore.

== See also ==
- Feralisaurus, a neodiapsid reptile from the Agriodontosaurus bone bed
- Kapes bentoni, a procolophonid reptile from the Agriodontosaurus bone bed
- 2025 in reptile paleontology
