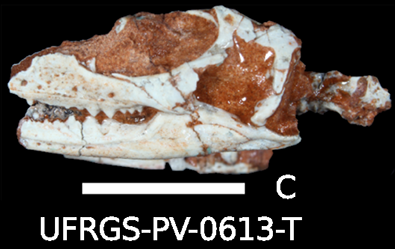
- Paratype specimen

Scientific classification
- Kingdom: Animalia
- Phylum: Chordata
- Class: Reptilia
- Order: Rhynchocephalia
- Infraorder: Eusphenodontia
- Genus: †Microsphenodon; Chambi-Trowell et al., 2021

Type species
- †Microsphenodon bonapartei Chambi-Trowell et al., 2021

= Microsphenodon =

Microsphenodon Temporal range: Late Triassic

Extinct rhynchocephalian reptile

Microsphenodon is an extinct genus of sphenodontian from the Late Triassic of Brazil. The type species is Microsphenodon bonapartei. It is a small sphenodontian with a skull roughly 20 mm long, and represents a unique mosaic of characteristics shared by both early diverging sphenodontians (such as a broad parietal table, multiple tooth rows on the palate, and an elongated premaxillary process) and eusphenodontian characters (full acrodont dentition, high coronoid process and anterior successional teeth, including the earliest known caniniforms in a lepidosaur). Specimens of this taxon were first identified by Bonaparte and Sues (2006) but were misidentified as juvenile Clevosaurus brasiliensis, characteristics such as differences in the configuration of the teeth on the palate, and the unique form of tooth implantation seen in C. brasiliensis, helped differentiate these two co-occurring sphenodontian taxa.

Cladogram following Chambi-Trowell et al., 2021

- Rhynchocephalia
  - †Gephyrosaurus
  - - †Penegephyrosaurus
    - Sphenodontia
      - †Paleollanosaurus
      - †Vellberg rhynchocephalian
      - †Diphydontosaurus
      - Acrosphenodontia
        - †Planocephalosaurus
        - - †Godavarisaurus
          - Eusphenodontia
            - †Polysphenodon
            - - †Microsphenodon
              - - †Clevosauridae
                - Neosphenodontia
