= Clevosaurus =

Clevosaurus Temporal range: Late Triassic - Early Jurassic Carnian–Sinemurian
- Skulls of Clevosaurus hudsoni (left) and C. cambrica (right)

Scientific classification
- Kingdom: Animalia
- Phylum: Chordata
- Class: Reptilia
- Order: Rhynchocephalia
- Family: †Clevosauridae
- Genus: †Clevosaurus; Swinton, 1939

Species
- See text

Synonyms
- Dianosaurus Young, 1982

Extinct genus of reptiles

Clevosaurus (meaning "Gloucester lizard") is an extinct genus of rhynchocephalian reptile from the Late Triassic and the Early Jurassic periods. Species of Clevosaurus were widespread across Pangaea, and have been found on all continents except Australia and Antarctica. Five species of Clevosaurus have been found in ancient fissure fill deposits in south-west England and Wales, alongside other sphenodontians, early mammals and dinosaurs. In regards to its Pangaean distribution, C. hadroprodon is the oldest record of a sphenodontian from Gondwana, though its affinity to Clevosaurus has been questioned.

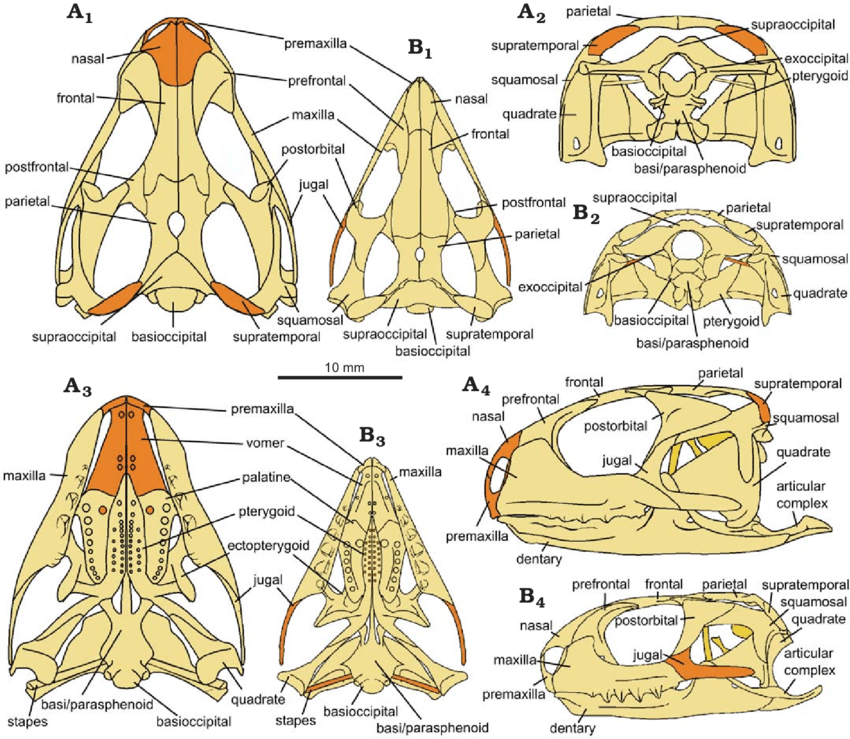
Reconstructions of the skulls of C. hudsoni (A) and C. cambrica (B), reconstructed areas in orange.

== History of discovery ==
The first species of Clevosaurus to be described was C. hudsoni, which was described by William Elgin Swinton in 1939 from a fissure fill deposit in Cromhall Quarry (Magnesian Conglomerate Formation) in the county of Gloucestershire, England, with the name of the county lending its name to the genus.

Another notable specimen was discovered in 1953 in Cromhall Quarry alongside the holotype of Cryptovaranoides microlanius.

== Description ==
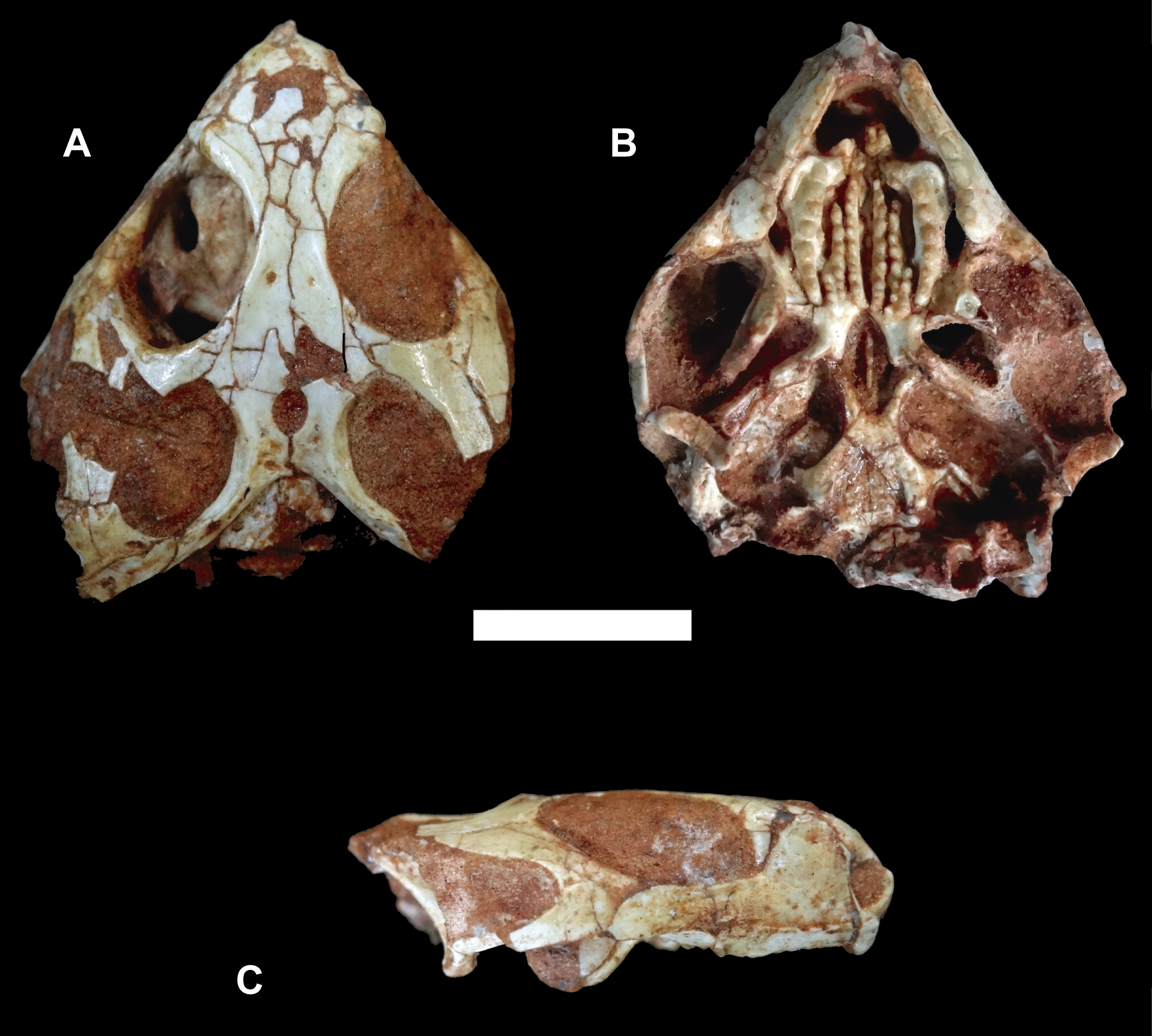
Skull of Clevosaurus brasiliensis

Species of Clevosaurus varied in body size, with Clevosaurus sectumsemper having an estimated total length of 12 centimetres (4.7 in), while C. hudsoni had a total length of around 25 centimetres (9.8 in). The skull length could range from as little as 1.4 centimetres (0.55 in) in C. sectumsemper and up to 4 centimetres (1.6 in) in C. hudsoni. The reptilian encephalisation quotient (REQ) of C. brasiliensis is much lower than that of the modern tuatara, whose REQ is 0.84–1.16. The teeth of European Clevosaurus tended to be mesio-distally elongated, blade-like, and occluded precisely with the opposite pair of teeth, leaving conspicuous diagonal wear facets and acting as a self-sharpening cutting surface. However, the teeth of C. brasiliensis have a very different morphology with no diagonal wear facets, the teeth of the dentary are all conical excluding the posterior-most tooth which can be up to three-times bigger than any of the other teeth, they also have a unique form of implantation, where the base of the teeth sit deeply within the jaw bones, which is not known of in any other rhynchocephalian.

== Paleobiology ==
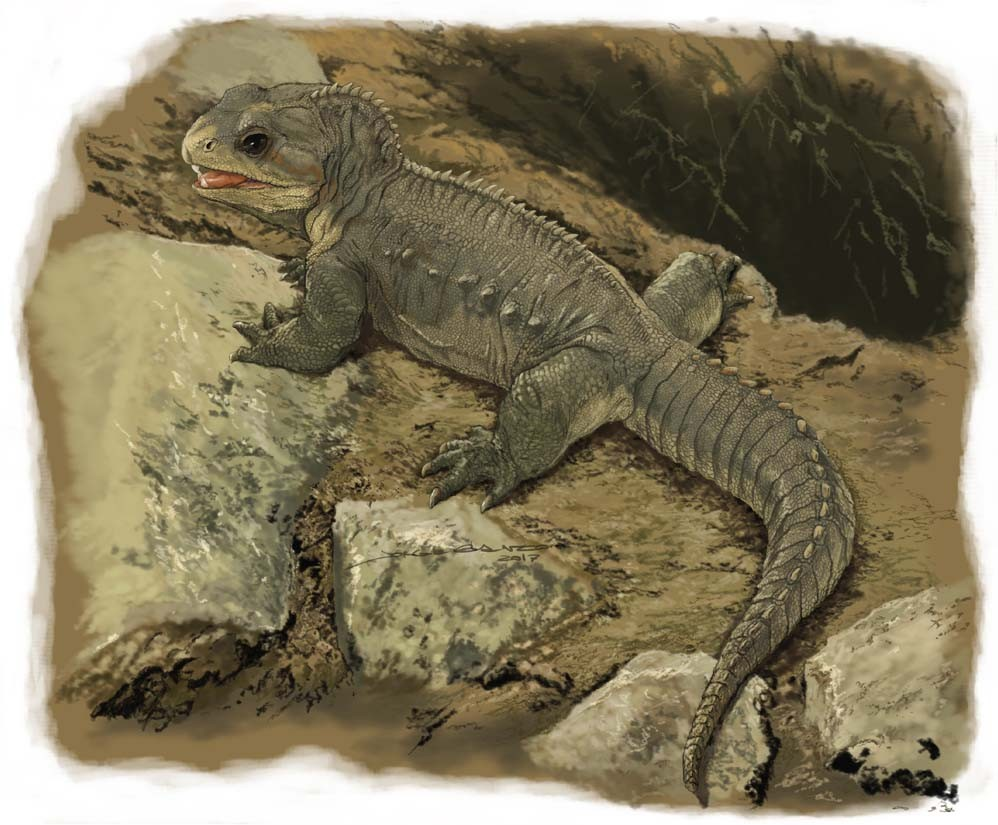
Life restoration of Clevosaurus hadroprodon

Species of Clevosaurus were likely insectivorous. Biomechanical modelling suggests that they had high enough tooth pressures and strong enough bite force to crush chitin, indicating that they had the ability to feed on thick-shelled beetles as well as possibly small vertebrates.

== Taxonomy ==
At least 9 species of Clevosaurus are considered valid:

- †Clevosaurus bairdi Sues et al. 1994 McCoy Brook Formation, Canada, Early Jurassic (Hettangian)
- †Clevosaurus brasiliensis Bonaparte and Sues 2006 Caturrita Formation, Brazil, Late Triassic (Norian)
- †Clevosaurus cambrica Keeble et al. 2018 Pant-y-ffynnon Quarry fissure fill, Wales, Late Triassic (Rhaetian)
- †Clevosaurus convallis Saila 2005 St. Bride's Island fissure fill, Wales, Hettangian
- †Clevosaurus hadroprodon Hsiou et al. 2019 Santa Maria Formation, Brazil, Late Triassic (Carnian)
- †Clevosaurus hudsoni Swinton 1939 Cromhall Quarry fissure fill, England, Rhaetian
- †Clevosaurus minor Fraser 1988 Cromhall Quarry fissure fill, England, Rhaetian
- †Clevosaurus sectumsemper Klein et al. 2015 Woodleaze Quarry fissure fill, England, Rhaetian
- †Clevosaurus nicholasi Bhat et al. 2023 Tiki Formation, India, late Carnian-middle Norian

The three species known from the Sinemurian aged Lufeng Formation of China (C. mcgilli, C.wangi and C. petilus) are now considered indeterminate within the genus. Indeterminate remains are also known from the Stormberg Group (either Elliot or Clarens Formation) of South Africa, dating to the Hettangian. Indeterminate clevosaur remains, possibly representing Clevosaurus, are also known from the Norian aged Fleming Fjord Group of Jameson Land, east Greenland.

Below is a cladogram of the relationships within Clevosauridae based on the phylogenetic analysis of Hsiou et al. (2015):

- Clevosauridae
  - Polysphenodon mulleri
  - - Brachyrhinodon taylori
    - Clevosaurus sp. (South Africa)
    - Clevosaurus convallis
    - Clevosaurus hudsoni
    - Clevosaurus petilus
    - - Clevosaurus bairdi
      - Clevosaurus mcgilli
      - - Clevosaurus wangi
        - Clevosaurus brasiliensis
        - Clevosaurus cambrica

"Clevosaurus" latidens was recovered outside of Clevosauridae, as the sister taxon of Opisthodontia. It was subsequently assigned to a new genus, Fraserosphenodon, in 2018.

Clevosaurus is considered to be a member of the group Eusphenodontia by the groups definition, due to it possessing characters not shared with more primitive sphenodontians. By definition, it is excluded from Neosphenodontia.

Position of Clevosaurus within Rhynchocephalia, after DeMar et al. 2022.

- - Younginia capensis
  - Prolacerta broomi
  - Lepidosauria
    - Pan-Squamata
      - Sophineta cracoviensis
      - Pristidactylus
      - Eichstaettisaurus schroederi
      - - Megachirella wachtleri
        - Marmoretta oxoniensis
    - Rhynchocephalia
      - Gephyrosaurus bridensis
      - Sphenodontia
        - Diphydontosaurus avonis
        - Acrosphenodontia
          - Planocephalosaurus robinsonae
          - - Rebbanasaurus jaini
            - - - Godavarisaurus lateefi
                - Theretairus antiquus
              - Eusphenodontia
                - Polysphenodon mulleri
                - - Opisthiamimus gregori
                  - - Clevosaurus
                      - - Clevosaurus convallis
                        - - Clevosaurus brasiliensis
                          - Clevosaurus hadroprodon
                      - - Clevosaurus bairdi
                        - - Clevosaurus hudsoni
                          - Clevosaurus cambrica
                    - Neosphenodontia
                      - Brachyrhinodon taylori
                      - - Colobops noviportensis
                        - - Sphenodontidae
                            - Sphenodon punctatus
                            - Cynosphenodon huizachalensis
                            - Sphenovipera jimmysjoyi
                            - - Kawasphenodon expectatus
                              - Kawasphenodon peligrensis
                            - Pelecymala robustus
                            - Eilenodontinae
                              - - Fraserosphenodon latidens
                                - Opisthias rarus
                              - - Eilenodon robustus
                                - - Sphenotitan leyesi
                                  - - Toxolophosaurus cloudi
                                    - Priosphenodon avelasi
                          - Leptorhynchia
                            - - Homoeosaurus maximiliani
                              - Kallimodon pulchellus
                            - - - Sigmala sigmala
                                - Vadasaurus herzogi
                              - Pleurosauridae
                                - Palaeopleurosaurus posidonae
                                - - Pleurosaurus goldfussi
                                  - Pleurosaurus ginsburgi
                            - Kallimodon cerinensis
                            - Sapheosauridae
                              - Sapheosaurus thiollierei
                              - - Ankylosphenodon pachyostosus
                                - Oenosaurus muehlheimensis

== Additional reading ==
- Paleofile
- Gill PG, Säilä LK, Corfe IJ, Challands TJ, Williams M, Clemens WA (2006). The fauna and palaeoenvironment of St. Brides Island: Evidence from the lower Jurassic fissure fills of South Wales. In Barrett PM, Evans SE (eds.). Ninth international symposium on Mesozoic terrestrial ecosystems and biota. pp 48−51. London: Natural History Museum.
- Jones MEH (2006) The Early Jurassic clevosaurs from China (Diapsida: Lepidosauria). Natl Mus Nat Hist Sci Bull, 37:548–562.
- Jones MEH (2009). Dentary tooth shape in Sphenodon and its fossil relatives (Diapsida: Lepidosauria: Rhynchocephalia). In Koppe T, Meyer G, Alt KW, (eds). Interdisciplinary Dental Morphology, Frontiers of Oral Biology (vol 13). Greifswald, Germany; Karger. 9–15.
