= McCoy Brook Formation =

Geological formation in Nova Scotia

- Stratigraphic range: Hettangian–Sinemurian
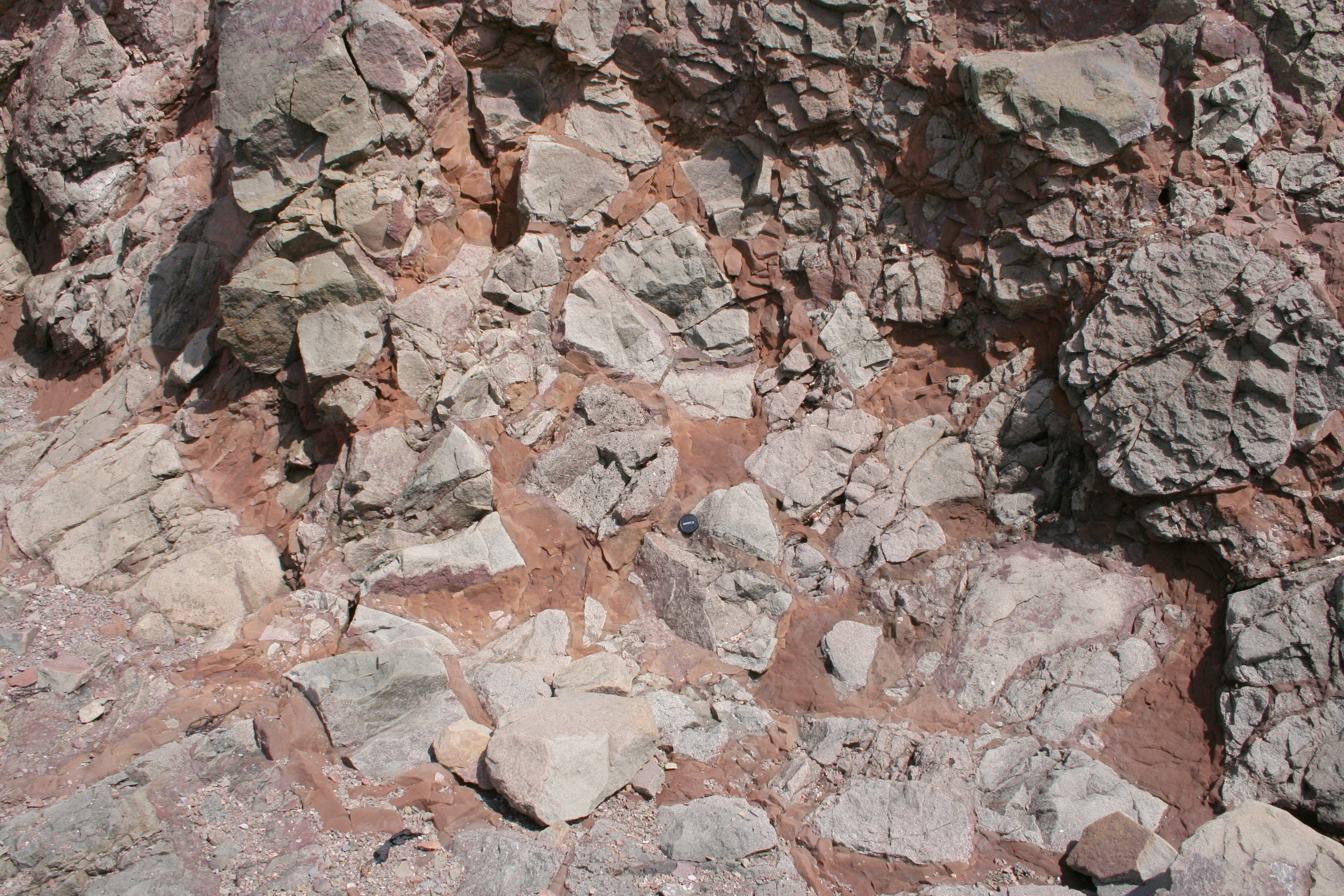
- Breccia in the McCoy Brook Formation (Jurassic), Wasson's Bluff, Nova Scotia.
- Type: Geological formation
- Unit of: Newark Supergroup; Meriden Group
- Sub-units: Scots Bay Member
- Underlies: Erosional top
- Overlies: North Mountain Basalt
- Thickness: more than 230 m (750 ft)

Location
- Coordinates: 45.4°N 64.2°W
- Approximate paleocoordinates: 27.4°N 13.3°W
- Region: Nova Scotia
- Country: Canada
- Extent: Bay of Fundy

Type section
- Named for: McCoy Brook, Nova Scotia
- McCoy Brook Formation (Canada) McCoy Brook Formation (Nova Scotia)

The McCoy Brook Formation is a geological formation dating to roughly between 200 and 190 million years ago and covering the Hettangian to Sinemurian stages. The McCoy Brook Formation is found in outcrops around the Bay of Fundy, Nova Scotia.

== Age ==
The McCoy Brook Formation rests on the North Mountain Basalt, one of the volcanic flows associated with the Triassic–Jurassic boundary in the Newark Supergroup. The base of the McCoy Brook Formation is probably within 100,000 to 200,000 years of the boundary.

== Scots Bay Member ==
This thin unit (9 m) of lacustrine sediments is preserved in six small synclinal outcrops around Scots Bay on the west side of the Blomidon Peninsula. Originally named as the Scots Bay Formation, it is now correlated with the lowermost part of the McCoy Brook Formation, where it is referred to as the Scots Bay Member. The Scots Bay Member accumulated in an aerobic lake on the floor of the subtropical Fundy Rift Valley, associated with Silica-rich Hydrothermal Springs derived from the CAMP vulcanism, where the biota is composed of algal Stromatolites, Oncolites, Charophyta, Ostracoda, Gastropoda, Conchostraca, fish bones, calcispheres and logs.

== Fossil content ==
=== Sharks ===
Color key: Taxon / Reclassified taxon / Taxon falsely reported as present / Dubious taxon or junior synonym / Ichnotaxon / Ootaxon / Morphotaxon	Notes; Uncertain or tentative taxa are in small text; ~~crossed out~~ taxa are discredited.

Sharks
Name	Species	Location	Stratigraphic position	Material	Notes	
cf.Hybodus	Indeterminate	Wasson Bluff	Scots Bay member	Teeth & Coprolites	A hybodont shark. Recovered from lacustrine facies	Two Hybodus

=== Ray-finned fish ===
Ray-finned fish
Name	Species	Location	Stratigraphic position	Material	Notes	Images
?Redfieldiid	None designated	Wasson Bluff	Scots Bay member	Scales and skull bones	Found in lacustrine limestone and lacustrine basalt aggregate	
aff. Semionotus sp.	None designated	Wasson Bluff	Scots Bay member	Disarticulated remains	Found in lacustrine limestone, lacustrine basalt aggregate, and lacustrine mudstone	Semionotus

=== Synapsids ===
Synapsids
Name	Species	Location	Stratigraphic position	Material	Notes	Images
Cynodontia	Indeterminate	Wasson Bluff	Scots Bay Member	Partial right unla; Proximal portion of a right ischium	A cynodont	
Oligokyphus	Oligokyphus sp.	Wasson Bluff	Scots Bay Member	Fragment of a right Dentary.	A tritheledontid cynodont, found in the layers of the Scots Bay member.	Oligokyphus
Pachygenelus	cf. P. monus	Wasson Bluff	Upper Member	Excellently preserved fragments of two premaxillae, ten maxillae, and six dentaries	A tritheledontid cynodont	Pachygenelus
Tritylodontidae	Indeterminate	Wasson Bluff	Scots Bay Member	Right humerus	A tritylodontid cynodont, found in the layers of the Scots Bay member.	

=== Sphenodonts ===
Sphenodonts
Name	Species	Location	Stratigraphic position	Material	Notes	Images
Clevosaurus	C. bairdi	Wasson Bluff	Lower McCoy Brook Formation	Partial skulls and jaws, isolated cranial bones, partial postcranium, postcranial bones	A sphenodontian of relatively small size, found in fluvio-lacustrine sandstone and mudstone, and basalt agglomerate	Clevosaurus
cf. Palycymalia	Indeterminate	Wasson Bluff	Middle McCoy Brook Formation	Isolated Remains	A sphenodontian	
cf. Sigmala	Indeterminate	Wasson Bluff	Middle McCoy Brook Formation	Isolated Remains	A sphenodontian	

=== Crocodyliforms ===
Protosuchidae
Genus	Species	Location	Stratigraphic position	Material	Notes	Images
Protosuchus	P. micmac	Wasson Bluff	Lower McCoy Brook Formation	Partial lower jaw, several other skull bones	Found in fluvio-lacustrine sandstone and mudstone, and basalt agglomerate	Protosuchus
Sphenosuchid	Indeterminate	Blue sack west; Wasson Bluff	Lower McCoy Brook Formation	A maxilla; Isolated Osteoderms	Found in fluvio-lacustrine sandstone and mudstone, and basalt agglomerate	

=== Dinosaurs ===
==== Ornithischia ====
Ornithischians
Genus	Species	Location	Stratigraphic position	Material	Notes
Ornithischia	Indeterminate	Wasson Bluff	Scots Bay Member	Impressions of teeth (YPM VP 008668, VP 008691); Vertebral centra (YPM VP 008693); Possible rib fragments (YPM VP008694, VP 008695)	Suggested to be similar to Scutellosaurus and to Leshotosaurus. Represent among the oldest reliable Ornithischian remains of North America.

==== Theropoda ====
Ornithischians
Genus	Species	Location	Stratigraphic position	Material	Notes
Theropoda	Indeterminate	Wasson Bluff	Scots Bay Member	Teeth	Theropod dinosaur teeth similar to Megapnosaurus.

==== Sauropodomorpha ====
Sauropodomorph dinosaurs
Genus	Species	Location	Stratigraphic position	Material	Notes	Images
Fendusaurus	F. eldoni	Wasson Bluff	Middle McCoy Brook Formation	YPM VPPU 022196, several vertebrae and limb-bone fragments; FGM994GF69, postcranial skeleton; FGM998GF9, partial skeleton; FGM998GF13_I, large, articulated specimen; FGM998GF13/FGM998GF13_III postcrania and dissociated skull; NSM005GF009/FGM998GF46, partial, badly deformed and fragmentary skeleton with gastroliths	Although long assigned to Ammosaurus, the material actually represents a new genus and species; represents the most abundant dinosaur in the formation, and has yield specimens with preserved stomach contents that suggest migration patterns. The possibility that represents more than one genus is open.	

=== Ichnotaxa ===
Color key: Taxon / Reclassified taxon / Taxon falsely reported as present / Dubious taxon or junior synonym / Ichnotaxon / Ootaxon / Morphotaxon	Notes; Uncertain or tentative taxa are in small text; ~~crossed out~~ taxa are discredited.

Ichnotaxa
Genus	Species	Location	Stratigraphic position	Material	Notes	Images
Anchisauripus	A. sillimani; A. ispp.	Blue sack west; McKay Head; Wasson Bluff	Middle McCoy Brook Formation	Footprints	Small Theropod Footprints	
Anomoepus	A. scambus; A. ispp.	Blue sack west; McKay Head; Old Wife Point tracksite	Middle McCoy Brook Formation	Footprints	Ornithischian Footprints	
Batrachopus	B. deweyii; B. dispar; B. ispp.	McKay Head; Old Wife Point tracksite; Wasson Bluff tracksite	Middle McCoy Brook Formation	Footprints	Crocodrylomorph Footprints	
Eubrontes	E. giganteus; E. sillimani; E. minusculus; E ispp.	Five Islands Provincial Park; Old Wife Point tracksite; Wasson Bluff tracksite	Middle McCoy Brook Formation	Footprints	Medium-sized Theropod Footprints	
Grallator	G. cursorius; G. tenuis; G. ispp.	McKay Head; Old Wife Point tracksite	Middle McCoy Brook Formation	Footprints	Small Theropod Footprints	Grallator
Otozoum	O. moodi; O. ispp.	Blue sack east; McKay Head; Minas Basin tracksite	Middle McCoy Brook Formation	Footprints	Sauropodomorph Footprints	Otozoum

== See also ==
- List of dinosaur-bearing rock formations
  - List of stratigraphic units with few dinosaur genera
