= Polysphenodon =

Polysphenodon Temporal range: Late Triassic, 235–205 Ma
- Reconstructed skull

Scientific classification
- Kingdom: Animalia
- Phylum: Chordata
- Class: Reptilia
- Order: Rhynchocephalia
- Clade: Acrosphenodontia
- Infraorder: Eusphenodontia
- Genus: †Polysphenodon; Jaeckel, 1911
- Species: †P. mulleri

Binomial name
- †Polysphenodon mulleri Jaeckel, 1911

Extinct genus of reptiles

Polysphenodon is an extinct genus of sphenodontian reptile with a single species Polysphenodon mulleri from the Late Triassic Keuper Group of Germany.

== History of discovery ==
The genus and only known species Polysphenodon mulleri was described by Otto Jaekel in 1911. Polysphenodon mulleri is known from a single partial skeleton recovered from a borehole sample at 775 metres (2,543 ft) depth, which includes parts of the skull, limbs and tail vertebrae. This specimen has been lost since the 1930s, but is known from several casts.

== Description ==
The skull was around 2.5 centimetres (0.98 in) long in life. The snout is relatively short, even when accounting for post-mortem distortion. The limbs of Polysphenodon, particularly the tibia, are long relative to the size of the skull and are similar in proportions to some species of Homoeosaurus. This resemblance is considered to be indicative of similar locomotory requirements rather than close evolutionary relationships.

== Taxonomy ==
Recent studies have placed Polysphenodon as a member of Eusphenodontia. Some authors have placed Polysphenodon as part of the family Clevosauridae alongside Clevosaurus and Brachyrhinodon, though other studies have recovered Polysphenodon as unrelated to these taxa.

Cladogram following Sues and Schoch, 2023:

- Rhynchocephalia
  - †Wirtembergia hauboldae
  - - †Gephyrosaurus bridensis
    - Sphenodontia
      - †Diphydontosaurus avonis
      - Acrosphenodontia
        - †Planocephalosaurus robinsonae
        - - †Rebbanasaurus jaini
          - - - †Godavarisaurus lateefi
              - †Theretairus antiquus
            - Eusphenodontia
              - †Polysphenodon mulleri
              - - †Opisthiamimus gregori
                - - †Clevosauridae
                    - - †Clevosaurus convallis
                      - - †Clevosaurus brasiliensis
                        - †Clevosaurus hadroprodon
                    - - †Clevosaurus bairdi
                      - - †Clevosaurus hudsoni
                        - †Clevosaurus cambrica
                  - Neosphenodontia
