= Fraserosphenodon =

Fraserosphenodon Temporal range: Late Triassic

Scientific classification
- Kingdom: Animalia
- Phylum: Chordata
- Class: Reptilia
- Order: Rhynchocephalia
- Clade: †Opisthodontia
- Genus: †Fraserosphenodon; Herrera-Flores et al., 2018

Type species
- †Fraserosphenodon latidens Herrera-Flores et al., 2018 (Fraser 1993)

Synonyms
- Clevosaurus latidens Fraser 1993

Extinct genus of reptiles

Fraserosphenodon is an extinct genus of sphenodontian - the same group to which the tuatara belongs - found in the Late Triassic of the United Kingdom.

This genus contains a single species, Fraserosphenodon latidens.. It was found by Nicholas C. Fraser, the Scottish palaeontologist and current Keeper of Natural Sciences at National Museums Scotland, and named in his honour. Originally, this taxon was assigned to Clevosaurus latidens, but it was later re-assessed and found to sit outside of this genus, and so was renamed.
