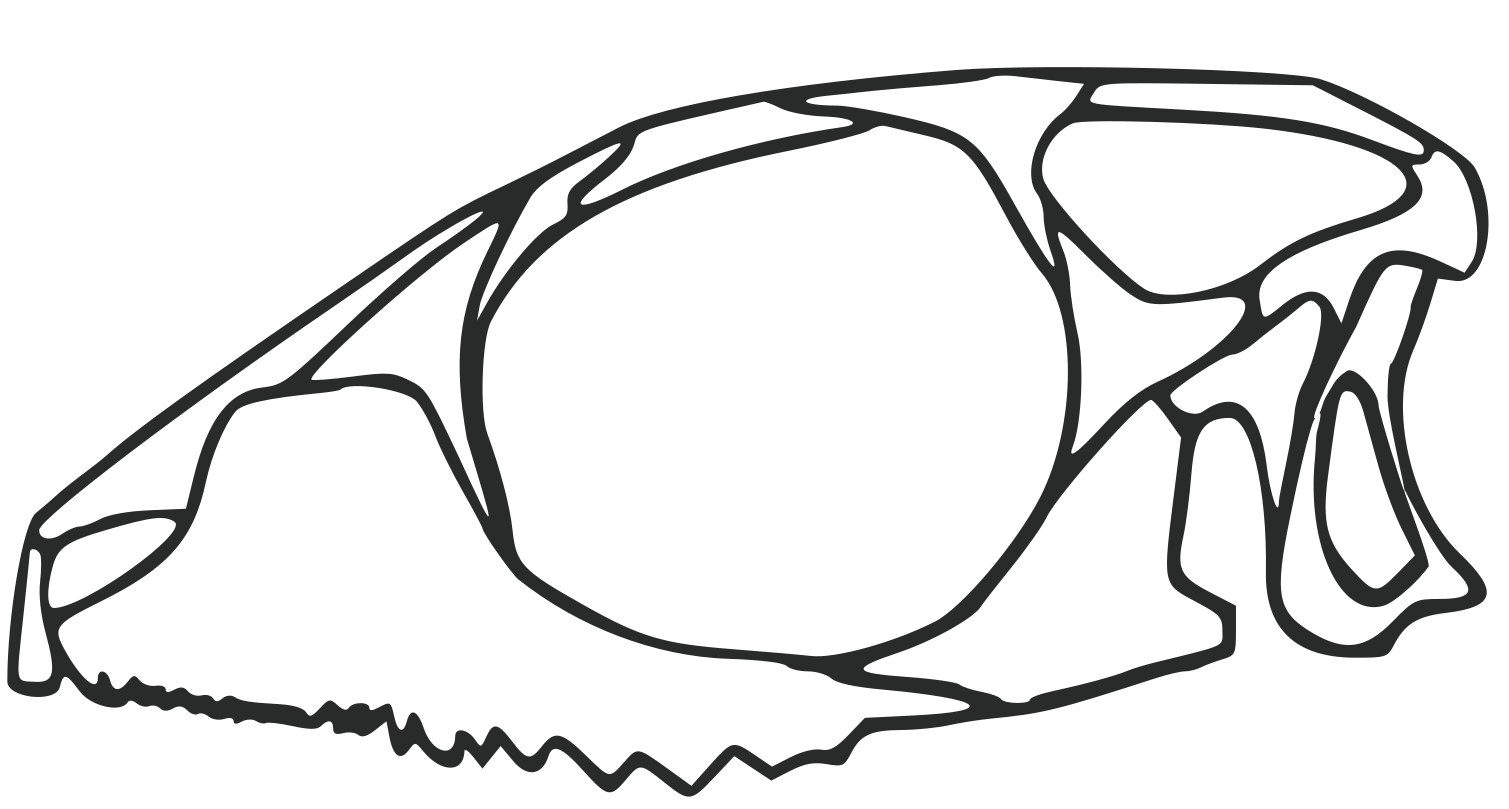
- Skull of D. avonis in lateral view
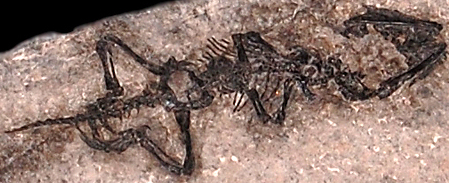
- Lombary specimen of Diphydontosaurus sp.

Scientific classification
- Kingdom: Animalia
- Phylum: Chordata
- Class: Reptilia
- Order: Rhynchocephalia
- Suborder: Sphenodontia
- Genus: †Diphydontosaurus; Whiteside, 1986
- Species: †D. avonis

Binomial name
- †Diphydontosaurus avonis Whiteside, 1986

= Diphydontosaurus =

Diphydontosaurus Temporal range: Late Triassic, 231–200 Ma

Extinct genus of reptiles

Diphydontosaurus is an extinct genus of small rhynchocephalian reptile from the Late Triassic of Europe. It is the most primitive known member of Sphenodontia.

== Description ==
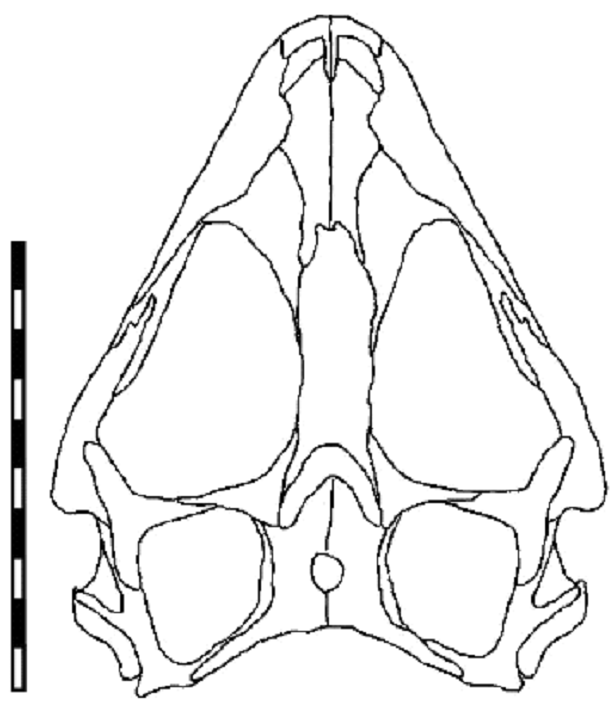
Skull viewed from above. Scale bar = 1 cm

Diphydontosaurus was one of the smallest sphenodontians, measuring up to 10 cm (4 in) long. It had long, sharp claws to help it catch its prey. The skull, which was around 1.4 cm (0.55 in) long, had large orbits (eye sockets), as well as a combination of 17 regularly replaced conical pleurodont teeth on the front of the jaws and 11 larger permanent acrodont teeth in the posterior jaws. It was likely an insectivore which used its acrodont posterior teeth to dismember prey.

== Classification ==
Diphydontosaurus avonis is known from abundant remains covering most of the skeleton found in fissure fill deposits in Southwest Britain. A skeleton of a juvenile sphenodontian tentatively referred to Diphydontosaurus was reported in 1996 from the Norian of Lombardy in Italy.

In most recent analyses it has been recovered as the most basal sphenodontian.

Cladogram after Sues & Schoch, 2023:

- - Rhynchocephalia
    - Wirtembergia hauboldae
    - - Gephyrosaurus bridensis
      - Sphenodontia
        - Diphydontosaurus avonis
        - Acrosphenodontia
          - Planocephalosaurus robinsonae
          - - Rebbanasaurus jaini
            - - - Godavarisaurus lateefi
                - Theretairus antiquus
              - Eusphenodontia
                - Polysphenodon mulleri
                - - Opisthiamimus gregori
                  - - Clevosauridae
                      - - Clevosaurus convallis
                        - - Clevosaurus brasiliensis
                          - Clevosaurus hadroprodon
                      - - Clevosaurus bairdi
                        - - Clevosaurus hudsoni
                          - Clevosaurus cambrica
                    - Neosphenodontia

== Paleoecology ==
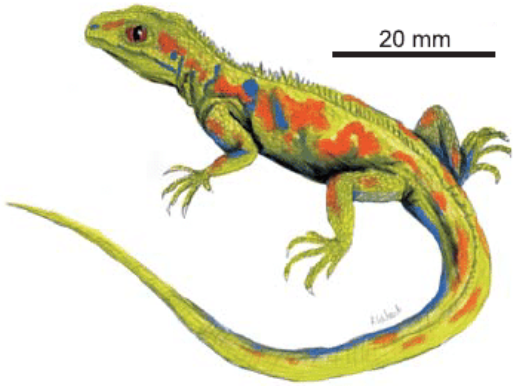
Life restoration

Diphydontosaurus avonis was a small animal that lived in the Bristol Channel region of England. It lived during the Late Triassic about 205 mya. The deposits in which it is from are complete enough for its ecosystem to be reconstructed in 2012. In the Late Triassic, the regions that Diphydontosaurus lived in were numerous rocky, small caves, that sat on a limestone bed. It is likely that the caves were eroded by possibly acidic rainwater. Diphydontosaurus is very well known from these deposits, potentially because they drowned after a rainstorm or monsoon.
