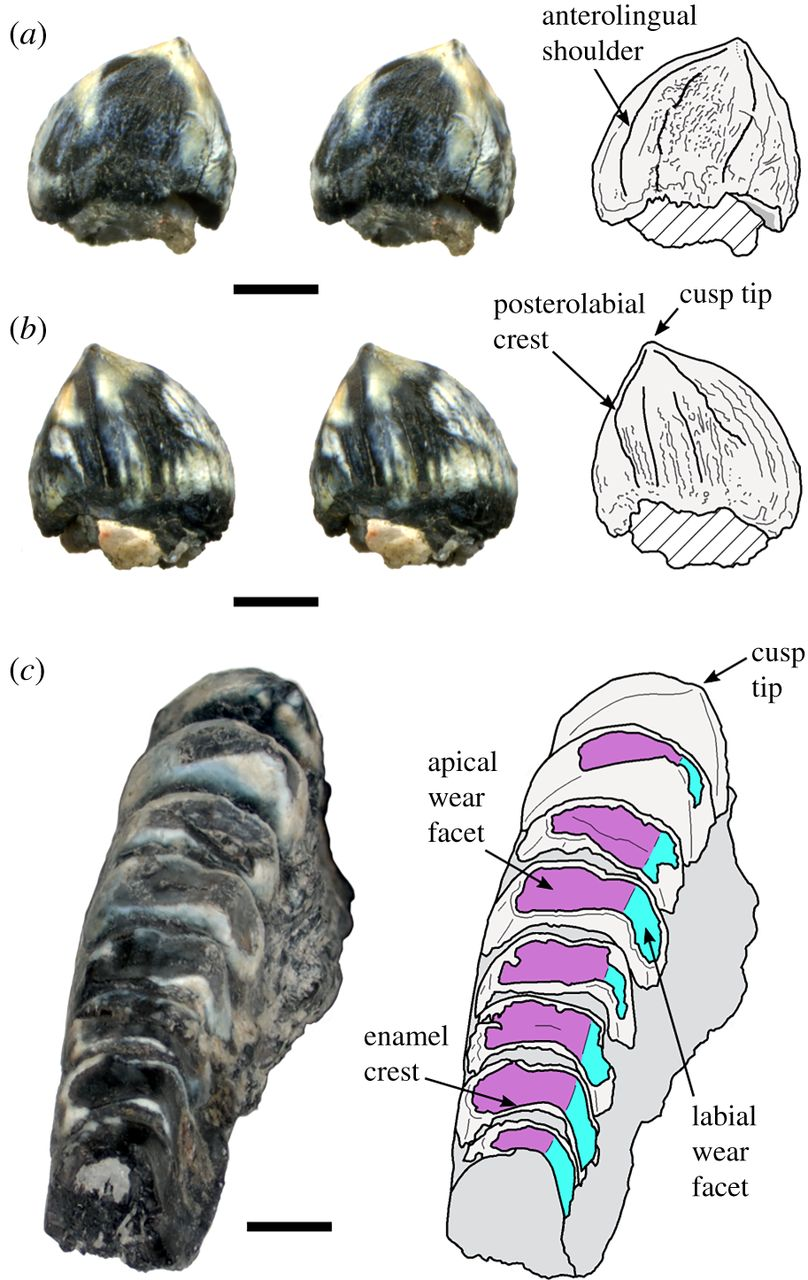
- An unworn tooth and jaw fragment of Eilenodon

Scientific classification
- Kingdom: Animalia
- Phylum: Chordata
- Class: Reptilia
- Order: Rhynchocephalia
- Suborder: Sphenodontia
- Subfamily: †Eilenodontinae
- Genus: †Eilenodon; Rasmussen & Callison, 1981

Type species
- †Eilenodon robustus Rasmussen & Callison, 1981

= Eilenodon =

Eilenodon Temporal range: Late Jurassic

Extinct genus of reptiles

Eilenodon is an extinct genus of rhynchocephalian reptile from the Late Jurassic Morrison Formation of western North America, present in stratigraphic zone 4. The only known species of this genus is Eilenodon robustus. It was a member of a group of rhynchocephalians called the eilenodontines, which were large, herbivorous members of Rhynchocephalia, the order of reptiles which contains the modern tuatara (Sphenodon). The generic name "Eilenodon" is Greek for "packed teeth", in reference to its closely packed teeth. The specific name, "robustus", refers to the strong build of the jaws.

== Description ==
Eilenodon robustus is the type species of Eilenodontinae, a subfamily of Opisthodontia. It and other eilenodonts had very wide and strongly packed teeth as well as a deep jaw for chewing and shredding plant material. It is primarily known from an incomplete pair of lower jaws approximately 5 centimeters (2 inches) long. If the jaws were complete, they would have been about 10 centimeters (4 inches) long, signifying that Eilenodon robustus was among the largest species of rhynchocephalians known, surpassed only by its fellow eilenodont Priosphenodon avelasi. Among all other rhynchocephalians, Eilenodon is most similar to Toxolophosaurus, another eilenodont which was redescribed the same year as Eilenodon's description. Even so, there are some differences between the two taxa.

=== Lower jaw bones ===
One of the main ways Eilenodon can be differentiated from Toxolophosaurus and its other relatives is the fact that the dentary (lower jaw bone) forms almost the entire length of the lower jaw. Nevertheless, the top half of the back part of the jaw is formed by other bones. The coronoid bone characteristically forms most of the outer edge of the tall coronoid process, which attaches to jaw muscles. The surangular bone forms the upper part of the back of the jaw. The rear tip of the jaw is formed by the articular bone while the inside edge of the jaw possesses a long, plate-like angular bone and a thin prearticular bone directly above it. A mandibular foramen (hole) is present at the intersection point of the dentary, coronoid, and surangular, a position further forward than the mandibular foramen of Toxolophosaurus.

=== Dentary teeth and jaw orientation ===
In eilenodonts, the mandibular teeth of the dentary become worn down on two sides due to contact with the maxillary and palatine teeth on the roof of the mouth. This creates two wear facets (worn away areas) in all but the most posterior teeth, converging in a 90-degree angle to form a blade-like ridge. The labial wear facet (worn-away area on the side facing the lips) was originally believed to have been positioned practically vertically while the apical (upward-facing) wear facet would have been positioned nearly horizontally, making the tooth row rectangular in cross-section. Towards the front of the jaw the wear facets shift inwards to a more diagonal position, making the tooth row triangular in cross-section. However, referred material discovered in 2003 proposed an alternative orientation of the lower jaw. This newer interpretation proposes that the upper edge of the jaws were rotated inwards, shifting the rectangular wear facets of the back of the jaw into a position more similar to the triangular shape in the front of the jaws.

Eilenodon's dentary teeth differ from those of Toxolophosaurus by being more closely packed and somewhat simpler, only slightly concave from the front and having only two dental ridges per tooth. In addition, as an individual rhynchocephalian matures, additional teeth grow from the back of its jaws. The last few teeth in the holotype jaw of Eilenodon are smaller than the preceding teeth. This indicates that the specimen was not fully grown. However, the teeth of the specimen are more worn than the teeth of the holotype jaw of Toxolophosaurus, which was fully grown due to having the last few teeth larger than the preceding teeth. This may indicate that Eilenodon fed on tougher plant material than Toxolophosaurus. However, other specimens of Eilenodon have preserved unworn rear teeth which were larger than the teeth towards the front of the jaw. Unworn teeth are bulbous with a pointed cusp.

=== Other bones ===
The quadrate bone is C-shaped, with the open part pointed backwards and upper and lower tips presumably articulating with the rear edge of the quadratojugal bone. Referred maxilla fragments are low and thick, covered in grooves, and curve sharply inwards above the tooth row. If these fragments are correctly referred to Eilenodon, they indicate that this genus had an unusually low and flat snout. The maxillary teeth only have one wear facet, a horizontal one. Under the 2003 interpretation of Eilenodon's jaws, the wear facets of maxillary teeth would point inwards and downwards, contacting the lateral wear facets of the dentary teeth.

== Discovery ==
The holotype specimen of Eilenodon robustus was collected in 1976 near Fruita in western Colorado, an area known for its Morrison Formation outcrops. This specimen, LACM 120462, was described in 1981 and consists of the rear part of both mandibles of the lower jaw as well as a right quadrate. Additional bone fragments, including a quadratojugal, vertebrae, and ribs, have also been reported from this locality but not described.

Four more specimens of Eilenodon found in various parts of Colorado and Eastern Utah between 1977 and 1993 were described in 2003 by John Foster. These include MWC 2907 (a right dentary fragment from Westwater Canyon), BYU 11460 (a dentary fragment from Dry Mesa Quarry), MWC 1200 (a left maxilla fragment from near Uravan), and DMNH 10685 (numerous jaw fragments and teeth from Garden Park). Components of the last specimen were discussed in a 2018 study on the microstructure of Eilenodon teeth. Eilenodon remains have also been reported from a site in Carbon County, Wyoming. Eilenodon is much more rare than another Morrison rhynchocephalian, Opisthias.

== Paleobiology ==
In 2018, Eilenodon was the subject of a study on rhynchocephalian tooth composition and development. This study was also a test for the usefulness of neutron scanning in paleontological applications. Neutron CT scanning is a rarely used alternative to conventional CT scans, which primarily rely on X-rays. Neutron scanning may be more useful than X-ray scanning in certain situations, as it can more easily differentiate between materials of similar density, such as the internal layers of teeth in some fossils.

An Eilenodon jaw fragment including a completely unworn tooth was subjected to X-ray and neutron scanning to determine the proportions between pulp, dentine, and enamel in the tooth. The X-ray scans could not differentiate between dentine and enamel as clearly as the neutron scans, which showed that the outer layer of enamel was about half as thick as the inner dentine layer in terms of volume. This enamel thickness was much higher than that of Sphenodon, the modern tuatara. This would have given Eilenodon a much higher bite force and resistance to tooth fracturing than Sphenodon. The teeth would have been able to withstand 2.3 to 3.1 times as much resistance to fracturing and would have had a cumulative maximum bite force of 625 to 843 Newtons, compared to 275 N in Sphenodon. Bite force is also correlated with body size, so the much higher value in Eilenodon is not entirely unexpected considering Eilenodon was much larger than Sphenodon, with an estimated skull length of 11 centimeters compared to 7. Even so, a tuatara scaled up to the head size of Eilenodon would have still had a smaller bite force of approximately 500 N, similar to that of the modern giant tegu (Salvator merianae) and northern caiman lizard (Dracaena guianensis), of the same size. The results suggest that Eilenodon had a very strong bite force even compared to other reptiles of its size.

The enamel's thickness is not completely uniform; it is thinnest at the crown of the teeth. This would have allowed wear facets to have been acquired early in life, to facilitate slicing and grinding plant matter. The study suggested that Eilenodon and other opisthodonts may have fed on horsetails of the genus Equisetum, which were nutritious and common in the Morrison Formation, but also high in silica, necessitating sharp and fracture-resistant teeth to process the plants.

== See also ==
- Prehistoric reptile
- Paleobiota of the Morrison Formation
