= Gephyrosaurus =

Gephyrosaurus Temporal range: Late Triassic-Early Jurassic, Rhaetian–195
- Restoration of the skull and lower jaw

Scientific classification
- Kingdom: Animalia
- Phylum: Chordata
- Class: Reptilia
- Order: Rhynchocephalia
- Family: †Gephyrosauridae
- Genus: †Gephyrosaurus; Evans, 1980

Type species
- †Gephyrosaurus bridensis Evans, 1980

Other species
- †G. evansae Whiteside & Duffin, 2017

Extinct genus of reptiles

Gephyrosaurus is an extinct genus of lepidosaurian reptile known from the Late Triassic to Early Jurassic of the United Kingdom. It is generally considered to be one of the most primitive members of the clade Rhynchocephalia.

== Description ==
Gephyrosaurus bridensis was relatively small in size, with a skull around 3 centimetres (1.2 in) long, 2 centimetres (0.79 in) wide and 1 centimetre (0.39 in) deep. The skull of Gephyrosaurus bridensis lacks a complete temporal bar, with a gap between the jugal and quadrate bones. Unlike more advanced rhynchocephalians belonging to Sphenodontia, Gephyrosaurus bridensis retains a lacrimal bone in the skull, though it is considerably reduced in size compared to more primitive reptiles. The frontal and parietal bones are unpaired. Each half of the upper and lower jaws have around 35-40 teeth. Unlike other known rhynchocephalians, all of these teeth are pleurodont, being attached to a shelf on the inner side of the jaw, with this being particularly apparent in the front of the jaw. However, the teeth at the back of the jaws have relatively shallow roots and appear to have undergone slower replacement than the front teeth. The postcranial skeleton of G. bridensis was lizard-like, with long legs.

== Taxonomy ==
The type species G. bridensis was described by Susan E. Evans in 1980 based on fossils found in Early Jurassic fissure fill deposits in South Wales. In 2017 a second species G. evansae was described from a maxilla found in fissure fill deposits from the Late Triassic (Rhaetian) of nearby Somerset. This species differs from the type by having distinctly smaller, more pointed and more densely packed teeth.

When originally described, Gephyrosaurus was placed in "Eosuchia", which is now considered to be a non-monophyletic group that included a wide variety of unrelated small diapsid reptiles.

Gephyrosaurus is now generally considered to be among the most primitive rhynchocephalians, being outside the clade Sphenodontia, which contains the vast majority of rhynchocephalians. Cladogram after Sues and Schoch (2023):

- - Rhynchocephalia
    - Wirtembergia hauboldae
    - - Gephyrosaurus bridensis
      - Sphenodontia
        - Diphydontosaurus avonis
        - Acrosphenodontia
          - Planocephalosaurus robinsonae
          - - Rebbanasaurus jaini
            - - - Godavarisaurus lateefi
                - Theretairus antiquus
              - Eusphenodontia
                - Polysphenodon mulleri
                - - Opisthiamimus gregori
                  - - Clevosauridae
                      - - Clevosaurus convallis
                        - - Clevosaurus brasiliensis
                          - Clevosaurus hadroprodon
                      - - Clevosaurus bairdi
                        - - Clevosaurus hudsoni
                          - Clevosaurus cambrica
                    - Neosphenodontia

Some other authors have found that instead that Gephyrosaurus is more closely related to Squamata (which contains lizards and snakes).

During its original description Evans placed Gephyrosaurus into its own family, Gephyrosauridae, which was originally monotypic, though later authors have also included other genera within the family.

== Ecology ==
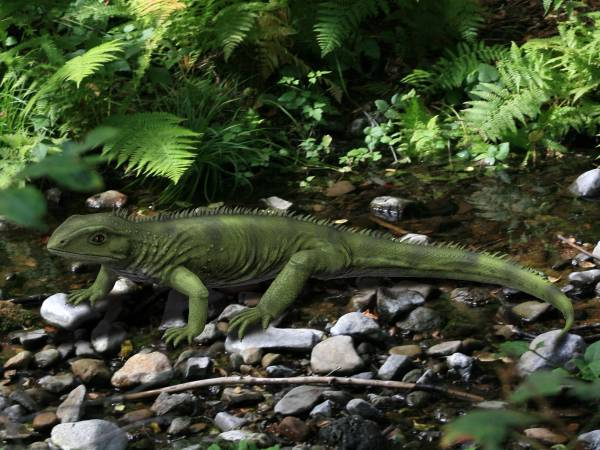
Life restoration

Gephyrosaurus is suggested to have been an insectivore that was probably diurnal (active during the day). The postcranial skeleton suggests that it was an agile animal that was capable of climbing. It is suggested to have used a "sit and wait" ambush strategy for catching prey. Findings of numerous jaw bones with healed fractures suggests that Gephyrosaurus may have engaged in fights with other conspecifics over territory, as occurs in some modern lizards.
