= Pelecymala =

Pelecymala Temporal range: 205.6–201.6 Ma

Scientific classification
- Domain: Eukaryota
- Kingdom: Animalia
- Phylum: Chordata
- Class: Reptilia
- Order: Rhynchocephalia
- Genus: †Pelecymala; Fraser, 1986
- Species: †P. robustus

Binomial name
- †Pelecymala robustus Fraser, 1986

Extinct genus of reptile

Pelecymala is an extinct genus of sphenodontian reptile that lived in southwest England during the Triassic period. It has been recovered in recent studies as a primitive member of the group.
