= Sigmala =

Sigmala Temporal range: Late Triassic

Scientific classification
- Kingdom: Animalia
- Phylum: Chordata
- Class: Reptilia
- Order: Rhynchocephalia
- Family: Sphenodontidae
- Genus: †Sigmala; Fraser, 1986

Extinct genus of reptile

Sigmala is an extinct genus of sphenodontian reptile from the Late Triassic of England.
