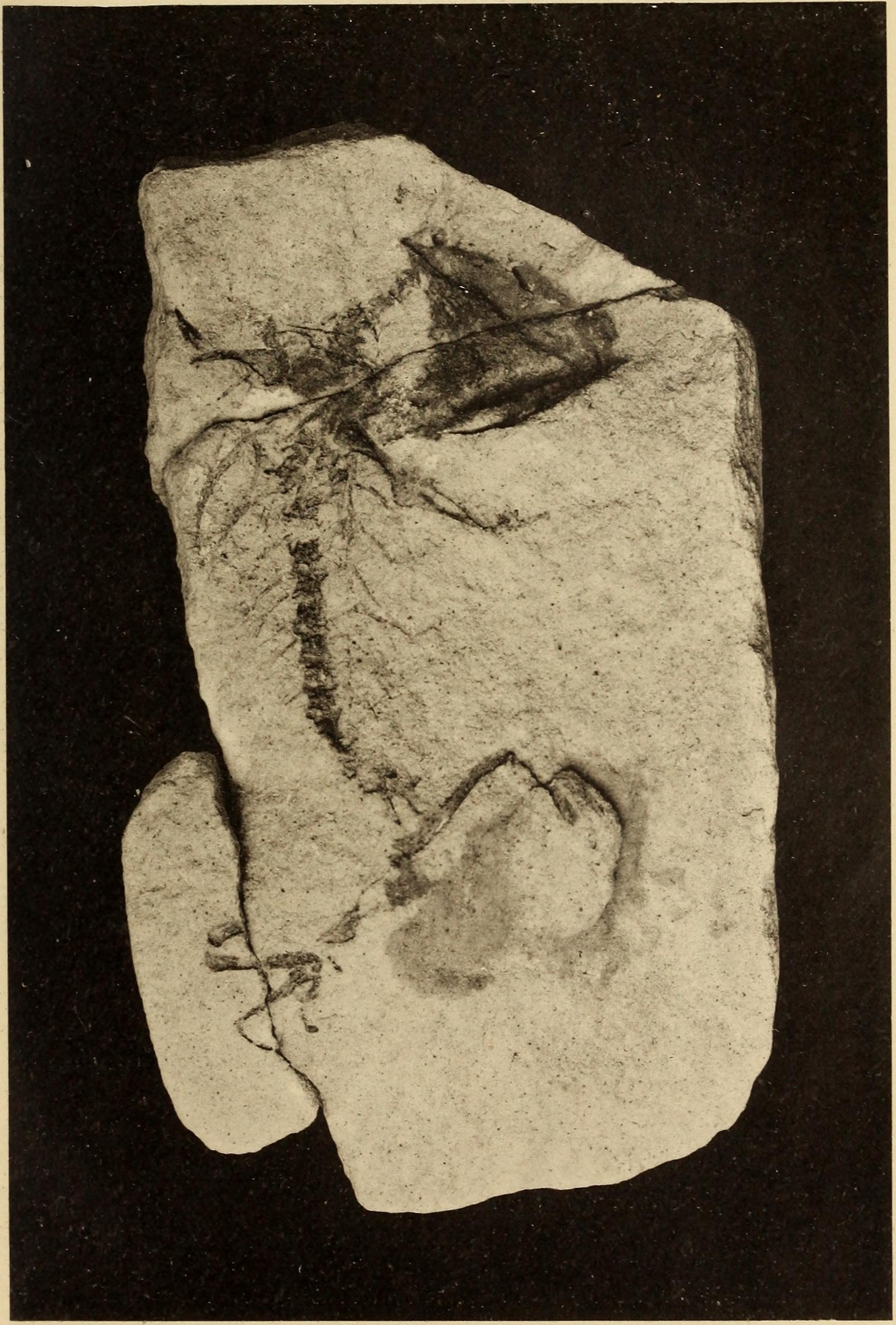

Scientific classification
- Kingdom: Animalia
- Phylum: Chordata
- Class: Reptilia
- Order: Rhynchocephalia
- Suborder: Sphenodontia
- Infraorder: Eusphenodontia
- Family: †Clevosauridae
- Genus: †Brachyrhinodon; Huene, 1910

Type species
- Brachyrhinodon taylori Huene, 1910

= Brachyrhinodon =

Brachyrhinodon Temporal range: Late Triassic, 237–227 Ma

Extinct genus of reptiles

Brachyrhinodon (meaning "short nose tooth") is an extinct genus of sphenodontian from the Late Triassic Lossiemouth Sandstone of Scotland.

== History of discovery ==
Brachyrhinodon and its single species B. taylori originally described in 1910 by German paleontologist Friedrich von Huene based on three specimens found near Elgin, Scotland where a number of reptile fossils (collectively dubbed the "Elgin Reptiles") have been found. The species was later redescribed in 1989 based on 12 specimens, representing at least 10 individuals. The specimens are largely preserved as negative moulds within the sandstone, which meant that casts needed to be made for description.

== Description ==
Skull diagram in side-on and top-down views

Brachyrhinodon is known from remains covering most of the skeleton. The skull of Brachyrhinodon is around 2.5 centimetres (0.98 in) long. The skull is relatively blunt. The front of the upper jaw overhangs the front of the lower jaw. The teeth are conical. The postcranial skeleton is similar to that of other sphenodontians.

== Taxonomy ==
Brachyrhinodon is considered to be a member of Eusphenodontia. Some studies have recovered it as closely related to Clevosaurus, placing both genera as part of the family Clevosauridae, with some studies finding B. taylori nested within Clevosaurus. Other studies have recovered Brachyrhinodon as unrelated to Clevosaurus.

== Ecology ==
A 1985 paper suggested an omnivorous diet.

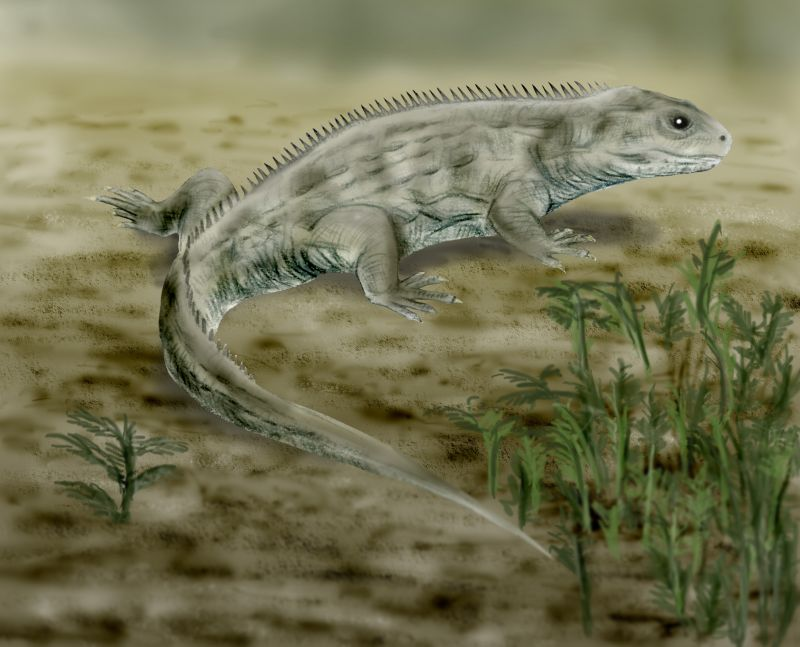
Life restoration
