= Acrodont =

Tooth placement in bony fish

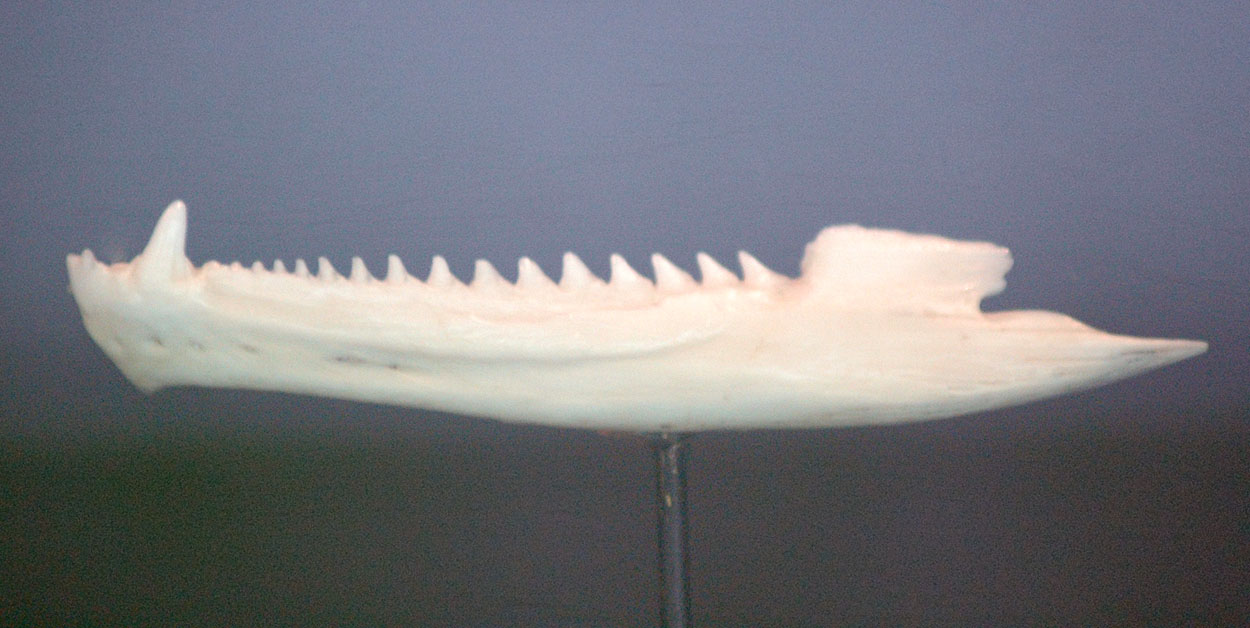
The main lower jaw bone of a tuatara (Sphenodon punctatus), showing acrodont dentition

Acrodonty (from Greek akros 'highest' + odont- 'tooth') is an anatomical placement of the teeth at the summit of the alveolar ridge of the jaw, without sockets, characteristic of bony fish. Functionally, acrodont tooth implantation may be related to greater bite force. However, this result is not supported when size and phylogeny is taken into account.

== Examples ==
=== Squamata ===
Within squamate reptiles, acrodont tooth implantation is best known in Acrodonta and some species of amphisbaenians, though some snakes are also referred to as being acrodont. Acrodonta is unique in that the name of the clade is based upon this trait. Most other squamate reptiles have pleurodont dentition, though some snakes are occasionally described as having acrodont dentition.

=== Rhynchocephalia ===
Acrodont tooth implantation is common within Rhynchocephalia, including Sphenodon.

=== Amphibia ===
Acrodont tooth implantation also present in some frogs and the temnospondyl Microposaurus.
