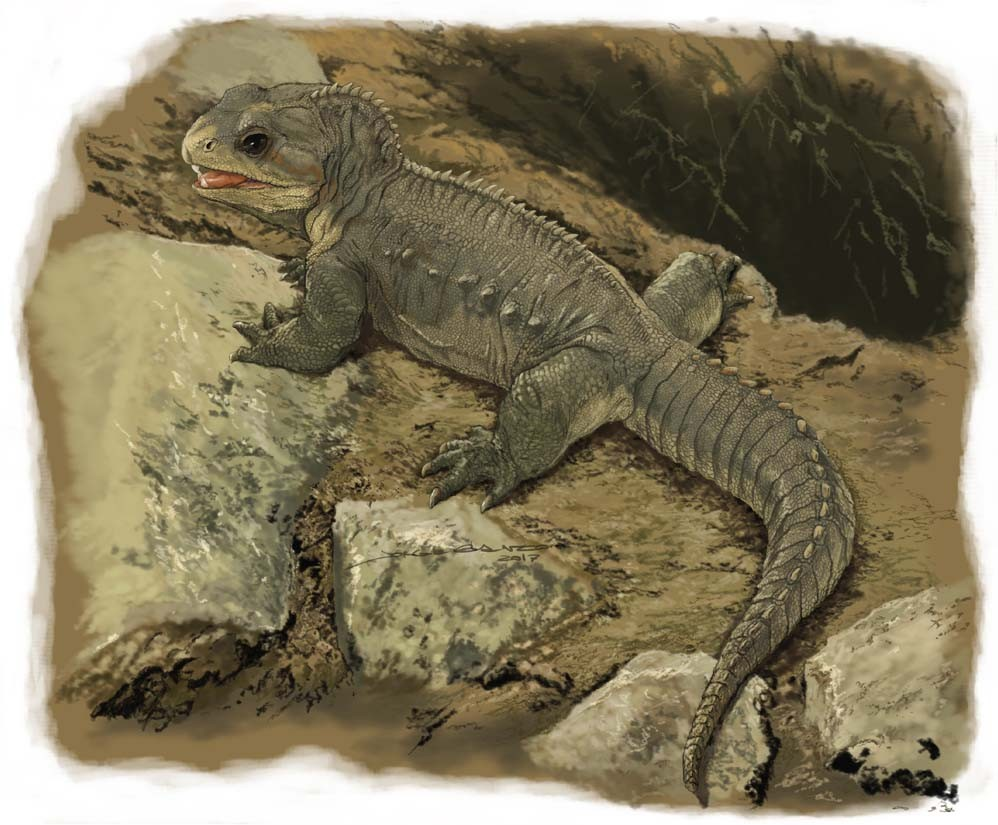
- Artist's illustration of Clevosaurus hadroprodon

Scientific classification
- Kingdom: Animalia
- Phylum: Chordata
- Class: Reptilia
- Order: Rhynchocephalia
- Infraorder: Eusphenodontia
- Family: †Clevosauridae; Bonaparte & Sues, 2006

Genera
- †Brachyrhinodon? Huene, 1910; †Clevosaurus Swinton, 1939; †Polysphenodon? Jaeckel, 1911

= Clevosaur =

Clevosaur Temporal range: Late Triassic–Early Jurassic

Family of reptiles

Clevosaurs are an extinct group of rhynchocephalian reptiles from the Triassic and Jurassic periods.

== History and definition ==
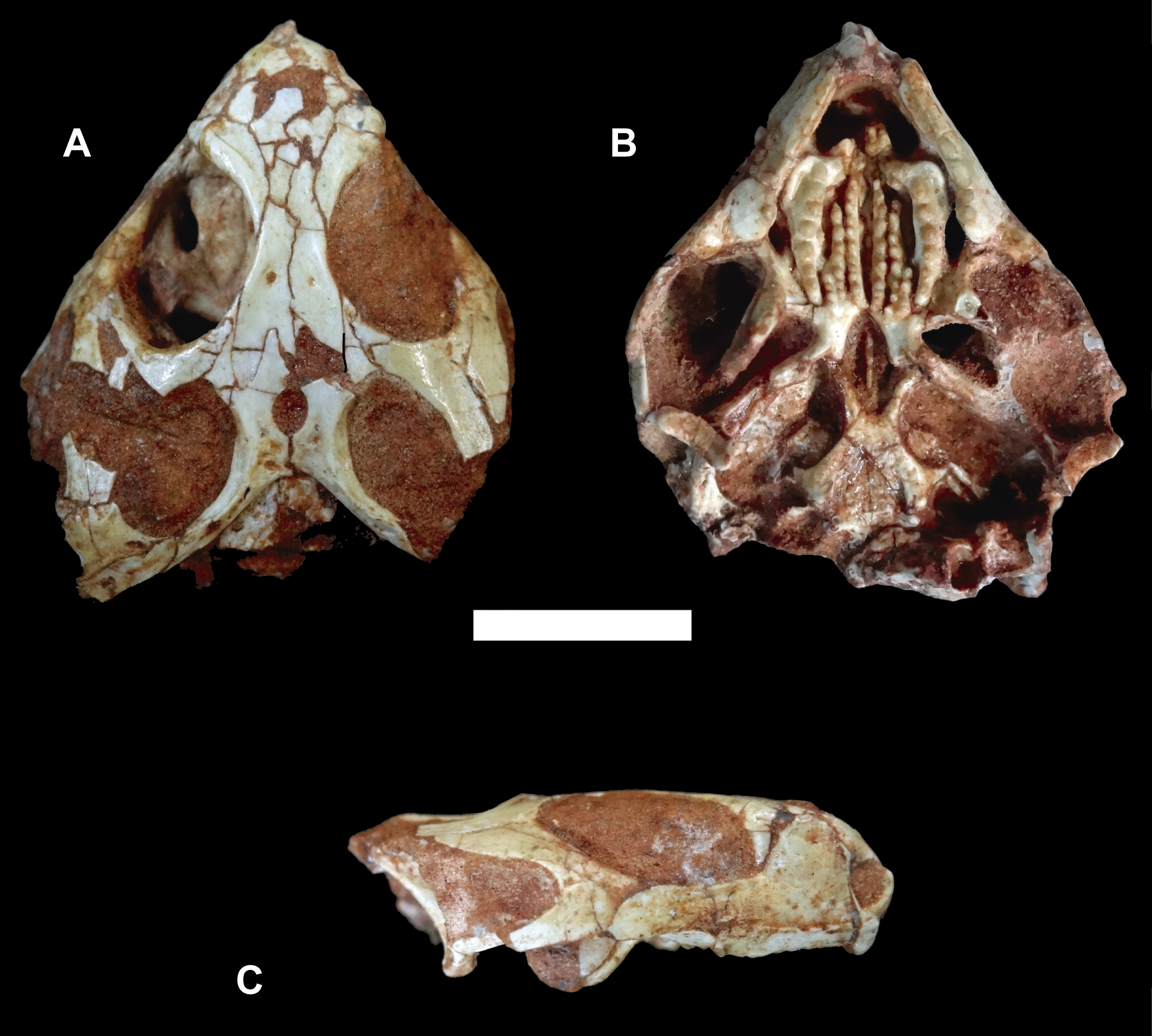
The skull of Clevosaurus brasiliensis

Although members of this group have been known since 1910, only recently has the group received a formal name. In the late 1990s, Victor-Hugo Reynoso established that three particular genera of Sphenodontia (Clevosaurus, Brachyrhinodon, and Polysphenodon) were closely related to each other. He gave the informal name "clevosaurs" to these three genera, after the most numerous and well-known genus, Clevosaurus. He considered clevosaurs to be members of the family Sphenodontidae, the family of rhynchocephalians containing the only living member of the order, the tuatara (Sphenodon).

In 2006, Bonaparte and Sues finally gave "clevosaurs" a formal name and taxonomic rank as the family Clevosauridae. They defined Clevosauridae as the last common ancestor of Clevosaurus, Brachyrhinodon, and Polysphenodon, and all of its descendants. In 2015, the definition of this family was revised to be "all taxa more closely related to Clevosaurus than to Sphenodon". However, the erection of this family conflicts with their position within Sphenodontidae, as a taxonomic family cannot be within another family. Sources which use Sphenodontidae as a wide group of sphenodontians do not use the term Clevosauridae, instead continuing to use the informal term 'clevosaurs'. On the other hand, sources which use Clevosauridae do not use Sphenodontidae. Some do not use either family, instead opting for 'clevosaurs' and 'advanced sphenodontians'.

== Description ==
Clevosaurs were among the first major groups of sphenodontians to evolve, and had a worldwide distribution in the Late Triassic and Early Jurassic. Clevosaurus was particularly widespread and diverse, surviving the Triassic-Jurassic extinction and being known from numerous species.

Adult clevosaurs are notable among sphenodontians for their short, boxy snouts. The antorbital region of the skull (the portion in front of the eyes) only occupies a quarter of the length of the entire skull in most clevosaurs, although a few species of Clevosaurus reacquire a slightly longer skull. Like other rhynchocephalians, they possessed two pairs of large holes called temporal fenestrae in the back part of the skull. The lower temporal fenestrae (on the sides of the skull) are very large in most clevosaurs, about a quarter the length of the skull. All clevosaurs have very long jugal bones which extend back as far as the squamosal bones in the back of the head, forming the entire upper edge of their lower temporal fenestrae in the process.

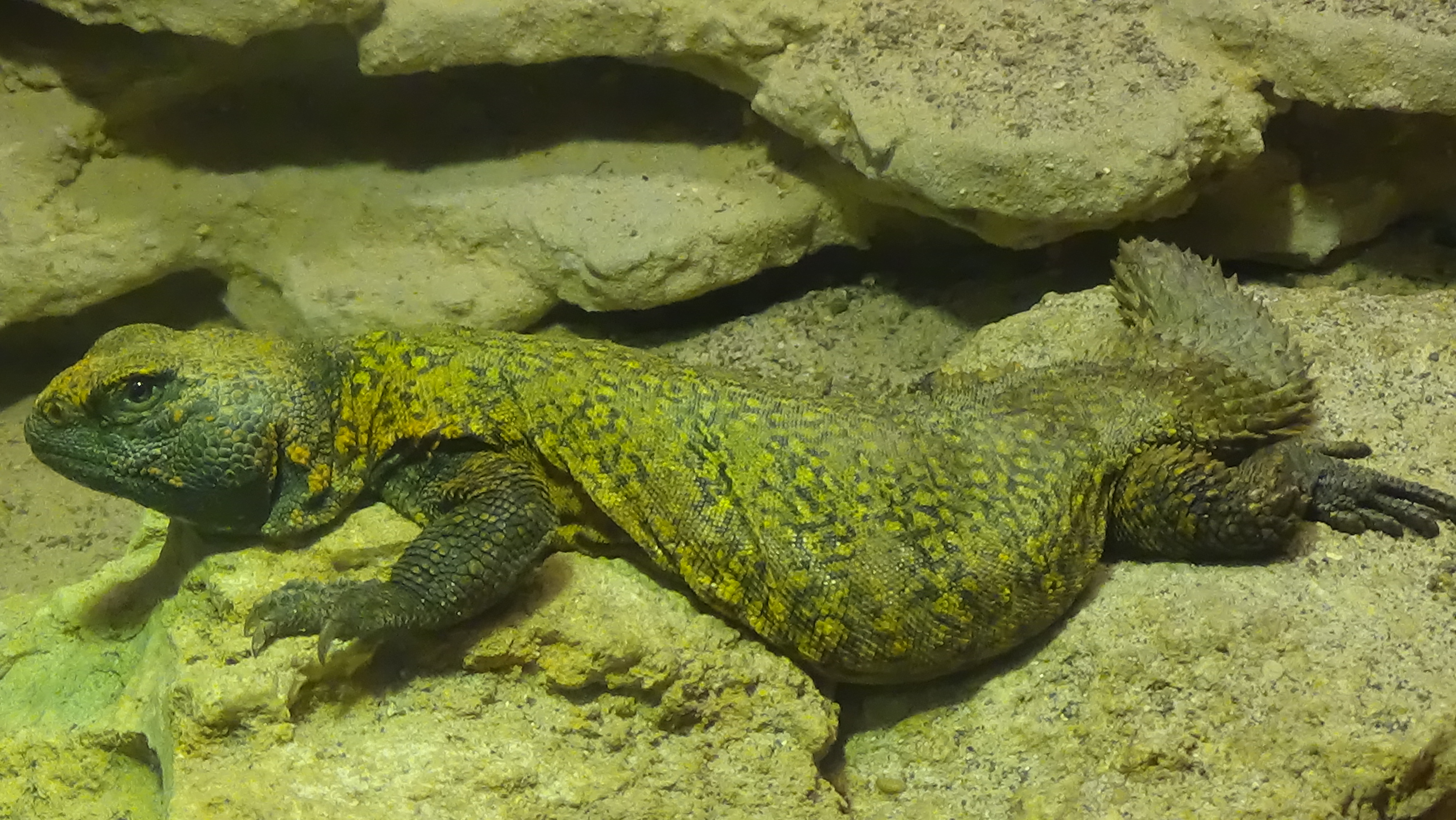
Uromastyx, a present-day equivalent of clevosaurs.

Like other sphenodontians, clevosaurs had several rows of teeth on the roof of the mouth. Their teeth were acrodont, meaning that they grew directly from the bone rather than from tooth sockets. The large outermost row of teeth were attached to the maxillae bones while the small innermost teeth were clustered in rows on the pterygoid bones. Between the maxillary and pterygoid teeth, clevosaurs characteristically had one row of large teeth on each palatine bone, as well as an additional isolated tooth at the inner front corner of each palatine.

Clevosaurs also had a row of teeth on the edge of their dentaries (lower jaws). In young individuals, these teeth were spike-like, well-adapted for consuming insects and other invertebrates. However, as individual clevosaurs grew older, their jaws became shorter and more robust. In addition, both their maxillary and dentary teeth wear down into a sharp cutting edge, creating a "beak"-like jaw structure somewhat similar to the jaws of modern Uromastyx lizards. It is likely that adult clevosaurs may have been omnivorous or herbivorous, similar to Uromastyx in ecology.

== Classification ==
Below is a cladogram of the relationships within Clevosauridae based on the phylogenetic analysis of Hsiou et al. (2015):

- Clevosauridae
  - Polysphenodon mulleri
  - - Brachyrhinodon taylori
    - Clevosaurus

"Clevosaurus" latidens was recovered outside of Clevosauridae, as the sister taxon of Opisthodontia.
