= Zapatadon =

Zapatadon Temporal range: Early Jurassic

Scientific classification
- Kingdom: Animalia
- Phylum: Chordata
- Class: Reptilia
- Order: Rhynchocephalia
- Family: Sphenodontidae
- Genus: †Zapatadon; Reynoso & Clark, 1998

Species
- †Z. ejidoensis Reynoso & Clark, 1998

Extinct genus of reptiles

Zapatadon is an extinct genus of sphenodontid reptile from the end of the Early Jurassic in the lower part of La Boca Formation of Tamaulipas, Mexico. Is known from a nearly complete skull with mandible of a post-hatchling individual (the specimen IGM 3497, in the Instituto de Geologia, of the Universidad Nacional Autónoma de Mexico), and is one of the smallest skulls between the sphenodontians, with an estimated total length of 11.3 millimetres, a bit smaller than the hatchling individuals observed in the modern tuatara (Sphenodon); features like the oblique mandibular symphysis suggests that the holotype is from an individual in a relatively mature stage of ontogenic development. Zapatadon is diagnosed by their hatchling tooth series located in a depression in the anterior part of the dentary bone, the prefrontal bone surrounding the dorsal process of the maxilla and the broad jugal that extends over the maxillary suborbital process, been almost excluded of the orbit.

Zapatadon was first described and named by Víctor-Hugo Reynoso and James M. Clark in 1998, and the name of the genus is a homage to the Mexican revolutionary leader Emiliano Zapata, added to the Greek suffix -odon, "tooth", common in other sphenodontian taxa; the name of the type species, ejidoensis is in gratitude to the people of the ejido (communal land area) of El Huizachal, that allow the investigation of the fossils.

In the La Boca Formation, where the fossils of Zapatadon were collected, also have been found fossils of another sphenodontian taxa like Cynosphenodon huizachalensis and the possibly venomous Sphenovipera jimmysjoyi, the primitive diapsid Tamaulipasaurus morenoi, the primitive pterosaur Dimorphodon weintraubi, the tritylodont Bocatherium mexicanum and the mammaliaforms Bocanodon tamaulipensis, Victoriaconodon inaequalis and Huasteconodon wiblei, along with fragmentary cranial and postcranial remains of crocodyliforms, and teeth of theropod and ornithischian dinosaurs.

== Classification ==
The phylogenetic analysis of the original description of Zapatadon found it as a part of a clade that contains to the subfamilies Eilenodontidae (Toxolophosaurus, Eilenodon) and Sphenodontinae (Sphenodon, Cynosphenodon), in an unresolved polytomy with the genus Opisthias and this subfamilies, within the family Sphenodontidae. This inclusion is supported by the great length of the supratemporal fenestra, more than a fourth of the skull length, the single palatine row of teeth, and an orbit less than a third of the skull length. Although certain features like the great length of the lower temporal fenestra and the enlarged quadrate-quadratojugal foramen are shared with Sphenodon, suggesting a close relationship, the authors noted that the immature nature of the holotype makes a mixture of advanced and primitive characters that do not allow them to make their phylogenetic relationships clearer.
