= La Boca Formation =

Geological formation in Mexico

- Stratigraphic range: Pliensbachian-Toarcian, 188–184 Ma
- Type: Geological formation
- Unit of: Huizachal Group
- Sub-units: Upper Part with Epiclastic Sedimentation; Lower Part with Pyroclastic sedimentation
- Underlies: La Joya Formation
- Overlies: Huizachal Formation
- Thickness: <10 m

Lithology
- Primary: Red sandstones, mudstones, and siltstones
- Other: Pyroclastic volcanic rocks

Location
- Region: Tamaulipas
- Country: Mexico

The La Boca Formation is a geological formation in Tamaulipas state, northeast Mexico. It was originally thought to date back to the Early Jurassic, concretely the Pliensbachian stage epoch of 193–184 Ma. Later studies found that while the unit itself was likely deposited during the earliest Pliensbachian, as proven by zircon dating 189.0 ± 0.2 Ma, the local vulcanism (related to the aperture of the Atlantic Ocean and the several Rift Events) continued until the Bajocian.

However, the lower section of the fossil taxa deposited on the rocks above the La Boca Formation is likely of Late Pliensbachian-Lower Toarcian age, and the upper section of Late Toarcian-Late Aalenian age. More recent works have correlated this unit with the fault movement along the Motagua-Chixoy-Polochic Transform Fault and the first sea transgression in the Portal del Balsas, producing a floodplain.

Due to successions of Aalenian depositional systems on the upper layers of the Huizachal Canyon, has been delimited the formation to the Toarcian stage. Deposits of Late Triassic Age referred to this unit have been reclassified in a new formation, El Alamar Formation. In North America, La Boca Formation was found to be a regional equivalent of the Eagle Mills redbeds of southern United States, the Todos Santos Formation of southern Mexico and the Barracas Group of the Sonora desert region.

== Paleoenvironment ==
La Boca Formation is genetically related to the Nazas volcanic Arc of the same age (Pliensbachian-Aalenian, ~189.5–171.6 Ma), which was created when Mexico evolved in a convergent plate margin, with the Gulf of Mexico remaining as a restricted basin and a passive margin. The influence of this arc is seen on the continental units such as Todos Santos Formation, which deposited volcanic materials in both nonmarine strata and marginal marine red beds of eastern Mexico.

La Boca Formation left its sediments on a basin formed between the Nazas Volcanic Arc center and the so-called Huizachal-Peregrina Anticlinorium, giving the basin layers whose origin is linked with braided river deposits with different flooding levels, channels fills, and channel belts filling valleys.

In locations such as Aramberri, the development of fluvial channels and the flooding of surfaces was restricted due to the presence of flanking volcanic activity, as well the local Paleozoic basement highs. In this outcrop the fluvial system evolved in several ways. Towards the north, it meanders from braided to ephemeral sandy, with the presence of common laminated sands sheets. The latter are likely a local indicator of unconfined flash floods across floodplains, with some sections recovering periods of desiccation thanks to the presence of mudcracks.

Towards the south, in localities such as El Olmo Canyon, the layers show gravelly braided rivers, oriented east-west, which then evolve into high-sinuosity single-thread meandering rivers. Other southern localities, such as the Caballeros Canyon and Huizachal Canyon, have layers that record gravel-bed braided rivers over a floodplain with high-energy flows: an element recorded on the local stratigraphy as older layers which were highly degraded by the increased force of the younger flows. The rock fragments moved by the currents are bigger in upper layers. In the southernmost outcrop, in Miquihuana the sheet sands show greater flooding events than on any other location.

In the main fossiliferous level of the Huizachal Canyon, in which more than 8000 specimens have been found, the preservation of delicate specimens such as Pterosaurs suggests an environment with little transportation and reworking. Yet the fossils were not buried in situ, as most of the smaller specimens show disarticulation.

All data trends suggest a highly unusual debris-flow environment in which local fluvial alluvial bodies were not big enough to sustain large freshwater biota such as fishes, and most of the preserved specimens were fast-buried near the place of death.

== Fossil record ==
=== Ichnofossils ===
Genus	Species	Location	Material	Type	Made by	Notes	Images
Mermia	M. isp.	Valle de Huizachal	Locomotion trace	Domichnia & Fodinichnia	Worms; Chironomidae midge larvae	Densely looped grooves or ridges.	
Scoyenia	S. isp.	Valle de Huizachal	Burrows	Domichnia & Fodinichnia	Crustaceans; Worms	Burrow fossils in lacustrine or fluvial environments, probably made by arthropods.	

=== Synapsida ===
Genus	Species	Location	Stratigraphic position	Abundance	Notes	Images
Bocaconodon	B. tamaulipensis	Jim's Joy, Huizachal Canyon	Lower Part	Teeth	A basal Mammaliaform	
Bocatherium	B. mexicanum	Huizachal Canyon	Lower Part	IGM 3492, Skull	A Tritylodontid	Bocatherium
Huasteconodon	H. wiblei	Huizachal Canyon	Lower Part	Teeth	A Gobiconodont(?)	
Victoriaconodon	V. inaequalis	Rene's Roost, Huizachal Canyon	Lower Part	Teeth	A Triconodontid(?)	
Mammaliaforms indet.	Indeterminate	Cementario, Huizachal Canyon; Casa de Fidencio, Huizachal Canyon	Lower Part	IGM 6855, partial right dentary; IGM 6856, left dentary; IGM 6622, partial right dentary		

=== Lepidosauromorpha ===
Genus	Species	Location	Stratigraphic position	Abundance	Notes	Images
Tamaulipasaurus	T. morenoi	Dinosaur National Monument South, Huizachal Canyon	Lower Part	IGM 6620, a nearly complete skull, missing the tip of the rostrum, with articulated mandible and eight articulated vertebrae; IGM 6621, a nearly complete skull with articulated mandible; IGM 6623, an isolated braincase	A strange burrowing Lepidosauromorph. Described originally as a "Burrowing diapsid representing a heretofore unknown clade", was later found to have a compact skull similar to that of Dibamidae and Amphisbaenia by convergent evolution.	Tamaulipasaurus

=== Sphenodontia ===
Genus	Species	Location	Stratigraphic position	Abundance	Notes	Images
Clevosaurus	aff. C. sp.	Puente de Piedra; JMC 85-A; Rene Roost; Tierra Buena del Sur at Huizachal Canyon	Lower Part	IGM 6565, left lower jaw; IGM 6566, split left lower jaw; IGM 6567, broken lower jaw; IGM 6568, almost complete lower jaw; IGM 6569, split right? lower jaw; IGM 6570, split right? lower jaw.	A Sphenodontidae Rhynchocephalian of the family Clevosauridae.	Clevosaurus
Cynosphenodon	C. huizachalensis	Huizachal Canyon	Lower Part	IGM 6652 Dental portion of the right dentary with a complete tooth row; IGM 6653, posterior right dentary; IGM 6654, anterior portion of a right maxilla; IGM 6655, middle portion of a right maxilla; IGM 6656, anterior part of a right dentary; IGM 6657, anterior portion of a right dentary; IGM 6658, symphysial region of a right dentary; IGM 6659, anterior part of a left dentary; IGM 6660, posterior part of a left dentary with coronoid process	A sphenodontine rhynchocephalian closely related to the living tuatara.	Cynosphenodon
Opisthias	aff. O. sp.	Rene's Roost and Puente de Piedra; Fidencio Hideway; Oeste de DNMS in Huizachal Canyon	Lower Part	IGM 6571, middle portion of a left lower jaw; IGM 6572, partial right lower lower jaw; IGM 6573, complete eroded right lower jaw; IGM 6574, left lower jaw; ?IGM 6748, partial right lower jaw; IGM 6749, partial left lower jaw; IGM 6750, almost complete right maxilla; IGM 6751, anterior portion of a right lower jaw; IGM 6752, partial right? lower jaw; IGM 6753, partial right lower jaw; IGM 6754, partial left? lower jaw; IGM 6755, very small partial left lower jaw; IGM 6756, partial left lower jaw; IGM 6757, partial right mandible, right maxilla, two incomplete vertebrae, a humerus epiphysis and some not recognized long bones; IGM 6758, partial right maxilla.	A Sphenodontidae Rhynchocephalian of the family Opisthodontia.	
Sphenovipera	S. jimmysjoyi	Jim's Joy, Huizachal Canyon	Lower Part	IGM 6076, an almost complete right lower jaw with teeth	A possible venomous Sphenodont	Sphenovipera
Zapatadon	Z. ejidoensis	Tierra Buena, western part of the Huizachal Canyon	Lower Part	IGM 3497, crushed skull, missing part of the skull table and roofing bones	A dwarf Sphenodont	

=== Pterosauria ===
Genus	Species	Location	Stratigraphic position	Abundance	Notes	Images
"Dimorphodon"	"D." weintraubi	Huizachal Canyon	Lower Part	Fragmentary skeleton of a large rhamphorhynchoid that includes a remarkably preserved pes.	A Pterosaur of uncertain phylogenetic placement, being originally proposed as a member of the genus Dimorphodon, although, has some great differences with the original holotype, and Dimorphodon is a lower Liassic Genus. Most recent analyses place it on different positions on Novialoidea.	

=== Crocodylomorpha ===
Genus	Species	Location	Stratigraphic position	Abundance	Notes	Images
Metasuchia indet.	Indeterminate	Huizachal Canyon	Lower Part	IGM 3498 & additional specimens. Partial skulls and postcranial skeletons	Preliminary results suggest it may be a stem metasuchian.	
Protosuchia? indet.	Indeterminate	Huizachal Canyon	Lower Part	Skull fragment	Found to be sister taxon of Platyognathus from the Lower Jurassic Lufeng Formation.	

=== Dinosauria ===
Genus	Species	Location	Stratigraphic position	Abundance	Notes	Images
Ceratosauria indet.	Indeterminate	Casa de Fidencio, Huizachal Canyon	Lower Part	IGM 6625, craneal fragmentary elements	A possible basal ceratosaur related with the African Berberosaurus.	
Heterodontosauridae indet.	cf.H.? sp.	Huizachal Canyon	Lower Part	Teeth	An Ornithischian of the family Heterodontosauridae.	Heterodontosaurus
Neotheropoda indet.	Indeterminate	Huizachal Canyon	Lower Part	Isolated teeth	Several morphotypes, maybe related with Coelophysoidea, Dilophosauridae or Tetanurae.	
Sauropodomorpha? indet.	Indeterminate	Rene's Roost, Huizachal Canyon	Lower Part	Large bone fragments	A possible Basal Sauropodomorph.	
"Syntarsus"	"S." mexicanum	Casa de Fidencio, Huizachal Canyon	Lower Part	(IGM 6624) partial twelfth dorsal vertebra, partial thirteenth dorsal vertebra, partial synsacrum, incomplete fused pelvis	An indeterminate Coelophysoidean.	Megapnosaurus

=== Palynology ===
Genus	Species	Location	Stratigraphic position	Material	Notes	Images
Araucariacites	A. cf. australis	La Escondida canyon; La Boca canyon	Lower Member	Pollen	A Pollen Grain, affinites with the family Araucariaceae inside Pinales. Conifer pollen from medium to large arboreal plants.	Extant Araucaria.
Exesipollenites	E. tumulus	La Escondida canyon; La Boca canyon	Lower Member	Pollen	A Pollen Grain, affinities with the Hirmeriellaceae in the Pinopsida.	
Dapcodinium	D. priscum	La Escondida canyon; La Boca canyon	Lower Member	Cysts	A Dinoflajellate of the family Rhaetogonyaulacaceae inside Gonyaulacales	
Eucommiidites	E. troedssonii	La Escondida canyon; La Boca canyon	Lower Member	Pollen	A Pollen Grain, afinnities with Erdtmanithecales inside Spermatophytes.	
Exesipollenites	E. tumulus	La Escondida canyon; La Boca canyon	Lower Member	Pollen	A Pollen Grain, affinities with the family Cupressaceae in the Pinopsida. Pollen that resembles that of extant genera such as the genus Actinostrobus and Austrocedrus, probably derived from dry environments.	Extant Austrocedrus.
Dictyophillidites	D. sp. 1	La Escondida canyon; La Boca canyon	Lower Member	Spores	A Miospore, affinities with Dipteridaceae inside Filicopsida	Extant Dipteris.
Krausellisporites	K. reissingeri	La Escondida canyon; La Boca canyon	Lower Member	Spores	A Miospore, affinities with Selaginellaceae or Lycopodiaceae inside Lycopsida.	Extant Selaginella.
Nannoceratopsis	N. gracilis	La Escondida canyon; La Boca canyon	Lower Member	Cysts	A Dinoflajellate of the family Nannoceratopsiaceae inside Nannoceratopsiales	
Ovalipollis	O. breviformis	La Escondida canyon; La Boca canyon	Lower Member	Pollen	A Pollen Grain, afinnities with Caytoniales inside Gymnospermopsida.	
Pareodinia	P. sp.	La Escondida canyon; La Boca canyon	Lower Member	Cysts	A Dinoflajellate of the family Pareodinioideae inside Gonyaulacales	
Quadraeculina	Q. anallaeformis	La Escondida canyon; La Boca canyon	Lower Member	Pollen	A Pollen Grain, affinities with Podocarpaceae and Pinaceae inside Coniferophyta.	
Rhaetogonyaulax	R. rhaetica	La Escondida canyon; La Boca canyon	Lower Member	Cysts	A Dinoflajellate of the family Peridiniphycidae inside Dinophyceae	
Spheripollenites	S. spp.	La Escondida canyon; La Boca canyon	Lower Member	Pollen	A Pollen Grain, affinities with the Hirmeriellaceae in the Pinopsida.	
Vitreisporites	V. pallidus; V. bjuvensis	La Escondida canyon; La Boca canyon	Lower Member	Pollen	A Pollen Grain, afinnities with Caytoniales inside Gymnospermopsida.	

=== Macroflora ===
Genus	Species	Location	Stratigraphic position	Material	Notes	Images
Agathoxylon	A. spp.	Huizachal-Peregrina Anticline; El Alamar Canyon	Lower Member	Fossil Wood	Affinities with Cheirolepidiaceae or Araucariaceae inside Pinales. Includes petrified wood logs up to 3.5 m in size	
Cheirolepidium	C. sp.	Near Ciudad Victoria	Lower Member	Seed cones	Affinities with Cheirolepidiaceae inside Pinales.	
Cephalotapsis	C. carolinensis	Novillo Canyon	Lower Member	Trunk Fragments	Affinities with Cupressaceae inside Pinales.	
Cycadolepis	C. sp.	Near Ciudad Victoria	Lower Member	Cone scales	Affinities with Cycadeoidaceae inside Bennettitales.	
Ctenophyllum	C. braunianum	Novillo Canyon	Lower Member	Leaflets	Affinities with Williamsoniaceae inside Bennettitales.	
Laurozamites	L. yaqui	Novillo Canyon	Lower Member	Leaflets	Affinities with Williamsoniaceae inside Bennettitales. Representative of large arboreal to low arbustive Bennetittes. The dominant foliar remain recovered on the formation, with up to 50 specimens	
Otozamites	O. gramineus	Near Ciudad Victoria	Lower Member	Leaflets	Affinities with Williamsoniaceae inside Bennettitales.	
Piazopteris	P. branneri	Novillo Canyon	Lower Member	Isolated Pinnae	Affinities with Matoniaceae inside Gleicheniales.	
Podozamites	P. sp.	Novillo Canyon	Lower Member	Branched Shoots	Affinities with Krassiloviaceae inside Voltziales.	Podozamites reconstruction

== See also ==
- Jurassic Mexico
- List of dinosaur-bearing rock formations
- List of pterosaur-bearing stratigraphic units
