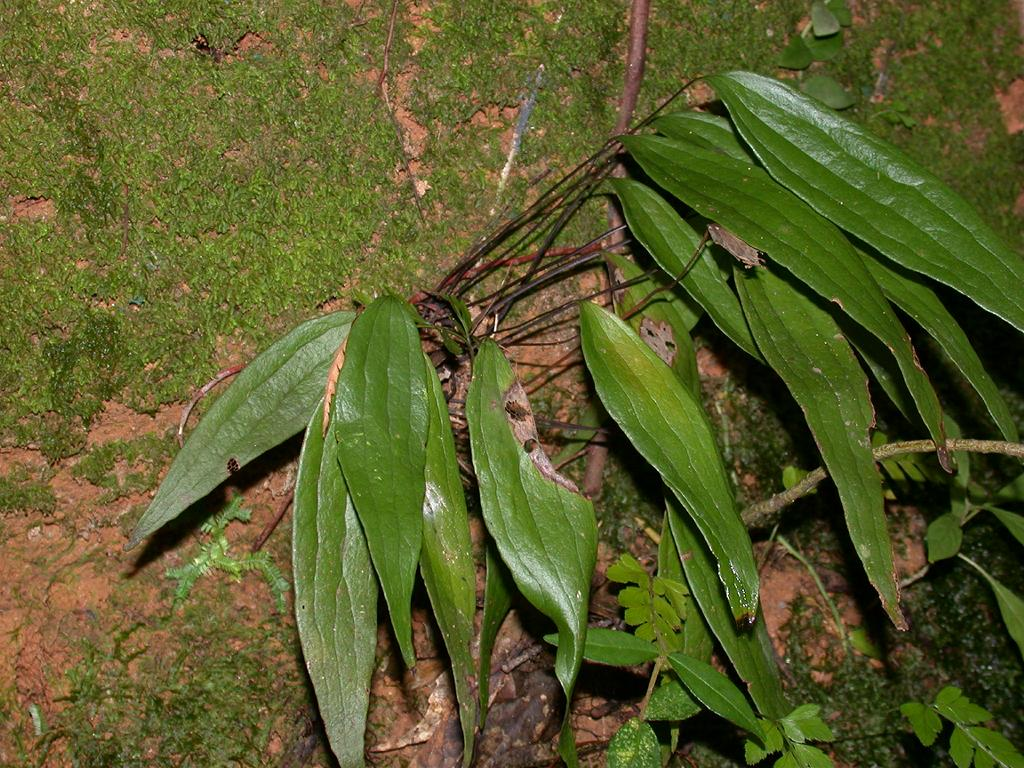
- Cheiropleuria integrifolia in Okinawa

Scientific classification
- Kingdom: Plantae
- Clade: Tracheophytes
- Division: Polypodiophyta
- Class: Polypodiopsida
- Order: Gleicheniales
- Family: Dipteridaceae
- Genus: Cheiropleuria; C.Presl

Type species
- Cheiropleuria bicuspis (Blume) Presl

Species
- C. bicuspis (Blume) Presl; C. integrifolia (Eaton exHooker) Kato et al.; C. parva Kato et al.

= Cheiropleuria =

Genus of ferns

Cheiropleuria is a genus of ferns in the family Dipteridaceae. Species are found in both temperate and tropical eastern Asia.

== Taxonomy ==
Cheiropleuria was first described by Carl Borivoj Presl in 1851. The type species Cheiropleuria bicuspis was first described as Polypodium bicuspe by Blume in 1828.

=== Species ===
As of November 2019, Plants of the World Online and the Checklist of Ferns and Lycophytes of the World recognized the following species:

- Cheiropleuria bicuspis (Blume) C.Presl – widely distributed in temperate and tropical eastern Asia
- Cheiropleuria integrifolia (D.C.Eaton ex Hook.) M.Kato, Y.Yatabe, Sahashi & N.Murak. – southern Japan, China (Guangdong, Guangxi), Taiwan
- Cheiropleuria parva M.Kato, Y.Yatabe, Sahashi & N.Murak. – Borneo

Phylogeny of Cheiropleuria:

- Cheiropleuria
  - C. bicuspis
  - - C. integrifolia
    - C. parva
