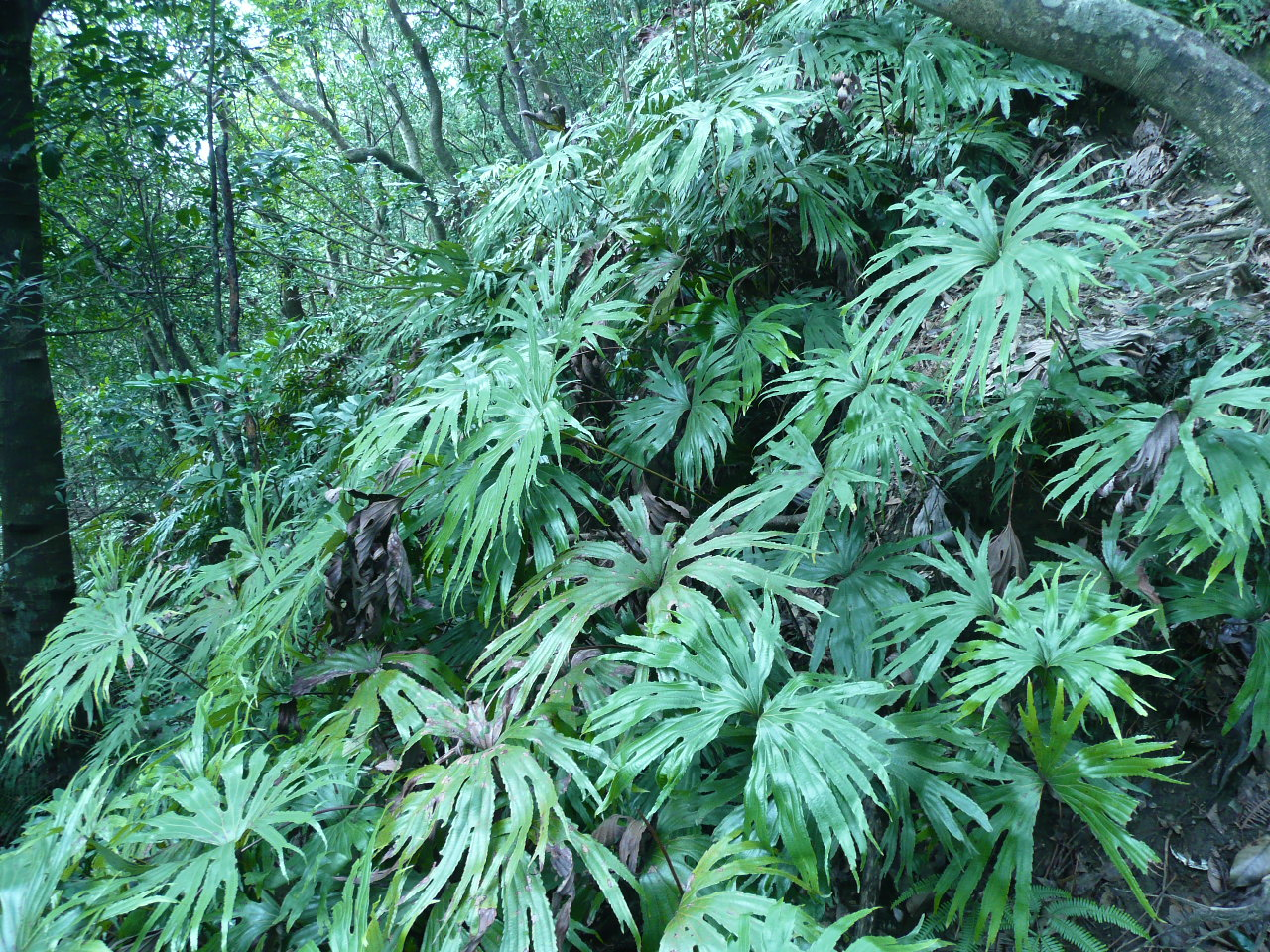
- Dipteris conjugata in Taiwan

Scientific classification
- Kingdom: Plantae
- Clade: Embryophytes
- Clade: Tracheophytes
- Division: Polypodiophyta
- Class: Polypodiopsida
- Order: Gleicheniales
- Family: Dipteridaceae
- Genus: Dipteris
- Species: D. conjugata

Binomial name
- Dipteris conjugata Reinw.

Synonyms
- Dipteris horsfieldii (R.Br. ex J.Sm.) Bedd.; Drynaria horsfieldii R.Br. ex J.Sm.; Phymatodes conjugata C.Presl; Polypodium conjugatum (Reinw.) Kaulf.; Polypodium dipteris Blume; Polypodium horsfieldii R.Br.

= Dipteris conjugata =

Species of plant

Dipteris conjugata is a species of fern in the family Dipteridaceae. It has a rhizome, and 2-3 tall stems with mid green or dark green fronds, which have several divisions to toothed lobes. It is grows in clearings, mountain ridges and in forest margins, from tropical and temperate Asia, northern Queensland in Australia and some islands in the Pacific Ocean. It has limited native medicinal uses.

== Description ==
This species has a long-creeping rhizome about 1 cm (0.4 in) diameter, covered with black shiny hairs up to 5 mm (0.2 in) long, which are coarser on the older sections of the rhizomes. The stipes (leaf stalks) are up to 2 m (6 ft 7 in) long, and have hair-like scales at base but are glabrous at the further end. They appear at regular intervals along the rhizome and branch three or four times.

The fronds are green on the upper surface and glaucous underneath. They are 35 to 50 cm (14 to 20 in) long and may be up to 80 cm (31 in) wide, and are divided to the base into two fan-shaped halves, each of which are further divided three or four times. The ultimate lobes taper to a narrow apex with the edges deeply or coarsely toothed. The main veins branch into two veins several times.

On the lower surface of the fronds are numerous small sori which are irregularly scattered and of irregular size and shape. They do not have indusia (umbrella-like covers) and have club-shaped paraphyses (filament-like support structures).

== Taxonomy ==
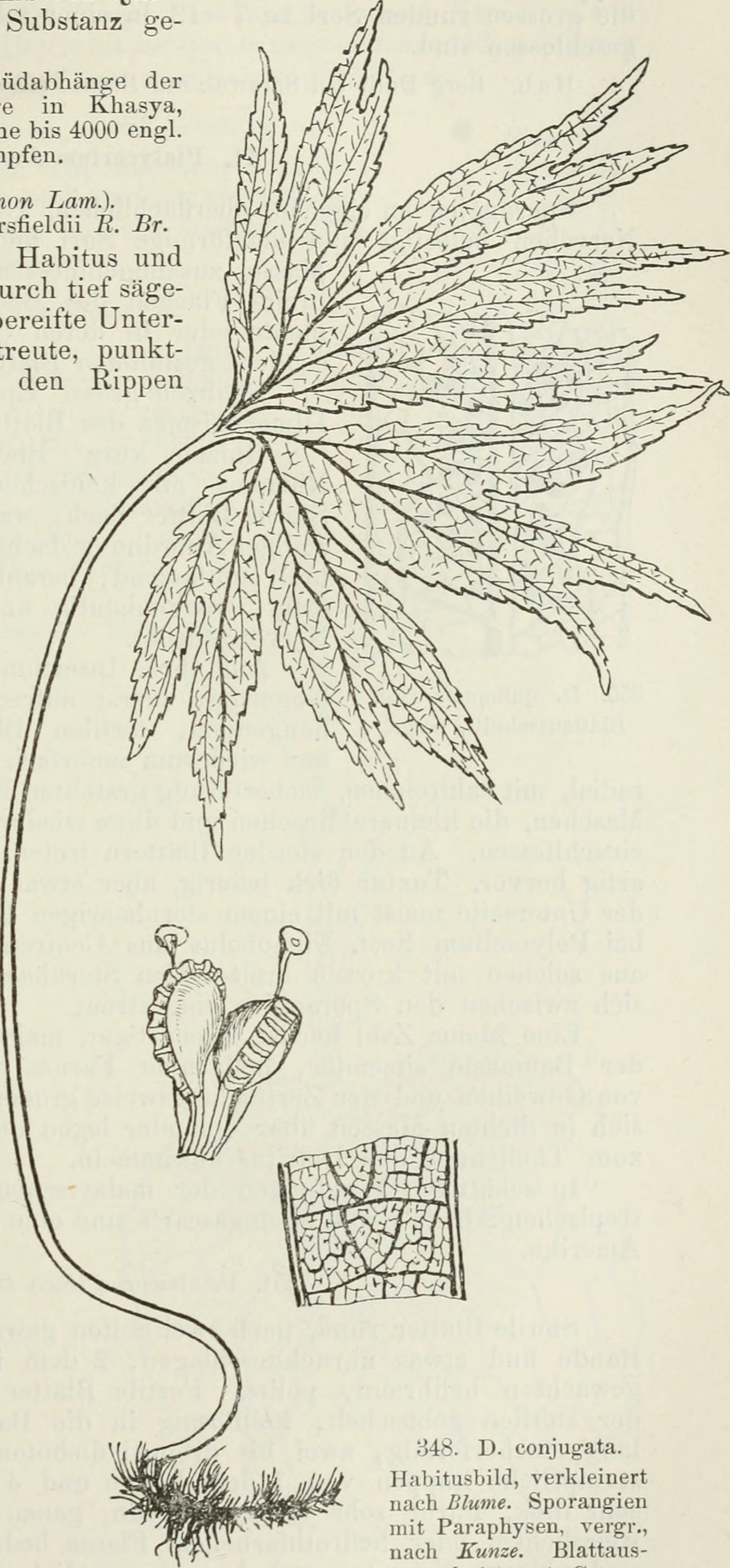
Illustration of the fern from Die Farnkräuter der Erde in 1897

This species was described by Caspar Georg Carl Reinwardt in the book Sylloge Plantarum Novarum in 1828. He did not mention the origin of the specimen(s) that his description was based upon.

=== Etymology ===
The species epithet conjugata refers to the leaf having one pair of leaflets.

=== Common names ===
In Fiji it is known as koukoutangane, or 'aivuiniveli'. In Thailand it is called bua chaek and bua cek in Singapore, It is written as 双扇蕨 or 破傘蕨, in Chinese script, and known as shuang shan jue in Pinyin in China.

== Biochemistry ==
The leaves contain 2 ent-kauranoid hydroxy acids.

== Distribution and habitat ==
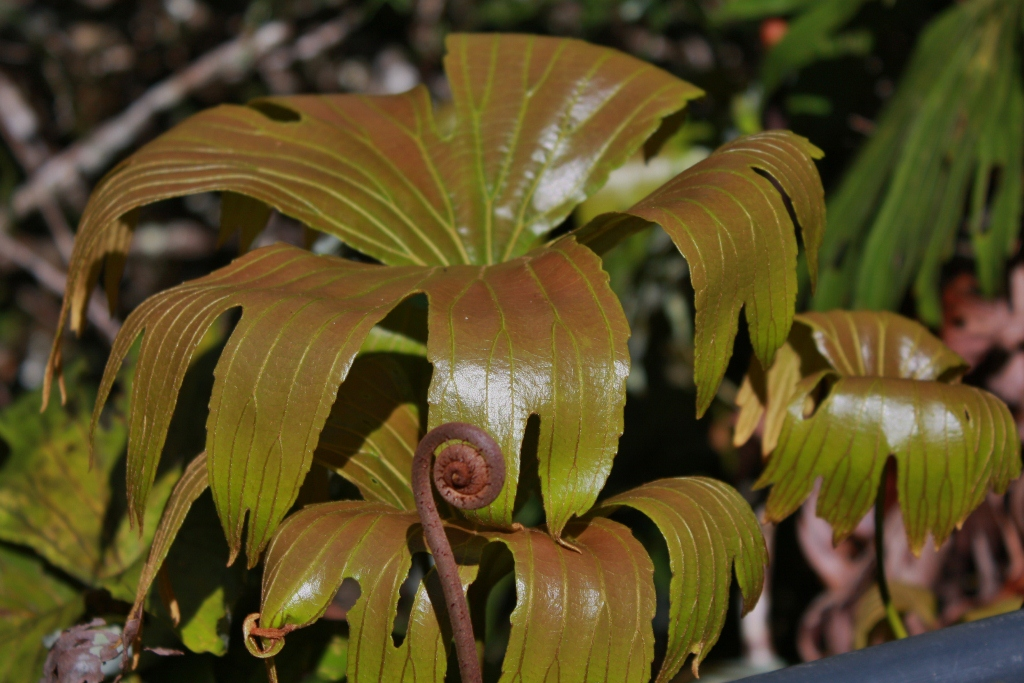
Close-up of the leaf of the fern

It is native to tropical and temperate Asia, Australia and some Pacific islands.

=== Range ===
It can be found in temperate Asia, within the Ryukyu Islands of Japan. In tropical Asia, within Papua New Guinea, Cambodia (mainly Kampot), Singapore, Thailand, Vietnam, and Hainan (in China), Taiwan, India, Indonesia, Malaysia (including on the slopes of Mount Ophir,) and in the Philippines. Also within Queensland in Australia, and on the islands of New Caledonia, (of New Zealand) and Fiji.

Within Thailand, it is found in the provinces of Surat Thani, Phangnga, Nakhon Si Thammarat, Trang and Yala. Within Singapore, it is found in the district of Kranji, Tanjung Gul and on the island of Pulau Tekong.

=== Habitat ===
D. conjugata grows on clay slopes, in clearings, ridges and on forest margins. In East Kalimantan, Indonesia, it grows along rivers together with Nypa Palms. In Borneo, it is found commonly growing with Histiopteris incisa (Thunb.) J. Sm. and Lygodium circinnatum (Burm.) Sw., along forest margins and paths. In New Caledonia, it is found on sunny roadside banks. The fern is also common in forest margins in high rainfall areas.

The species occurs mainly at altitudes of 500 to 1,200 m (1,600 to 3,900 ft) above sea level in China, 300 to 1,700 m (980 to 5,580 ft) in Malaysia, and 300 to 2,900 m (980 to 9,510 ft) in Singapore. In Singapore, it occurs on coastal cliffs, and at the risk of landslides.

== Conservation ==
This species has a varying status in different countries. In Singapore it is classed as critically endangered, in Queensland it has been assessed as near threatened, while in Cambodia, Thailand and Laos it is seen as having no threats, such that it was recommended to the IUCN that it be classed as least concern. As of August 2024, it has not been assessed by the IUCN.

== Cultivation ==
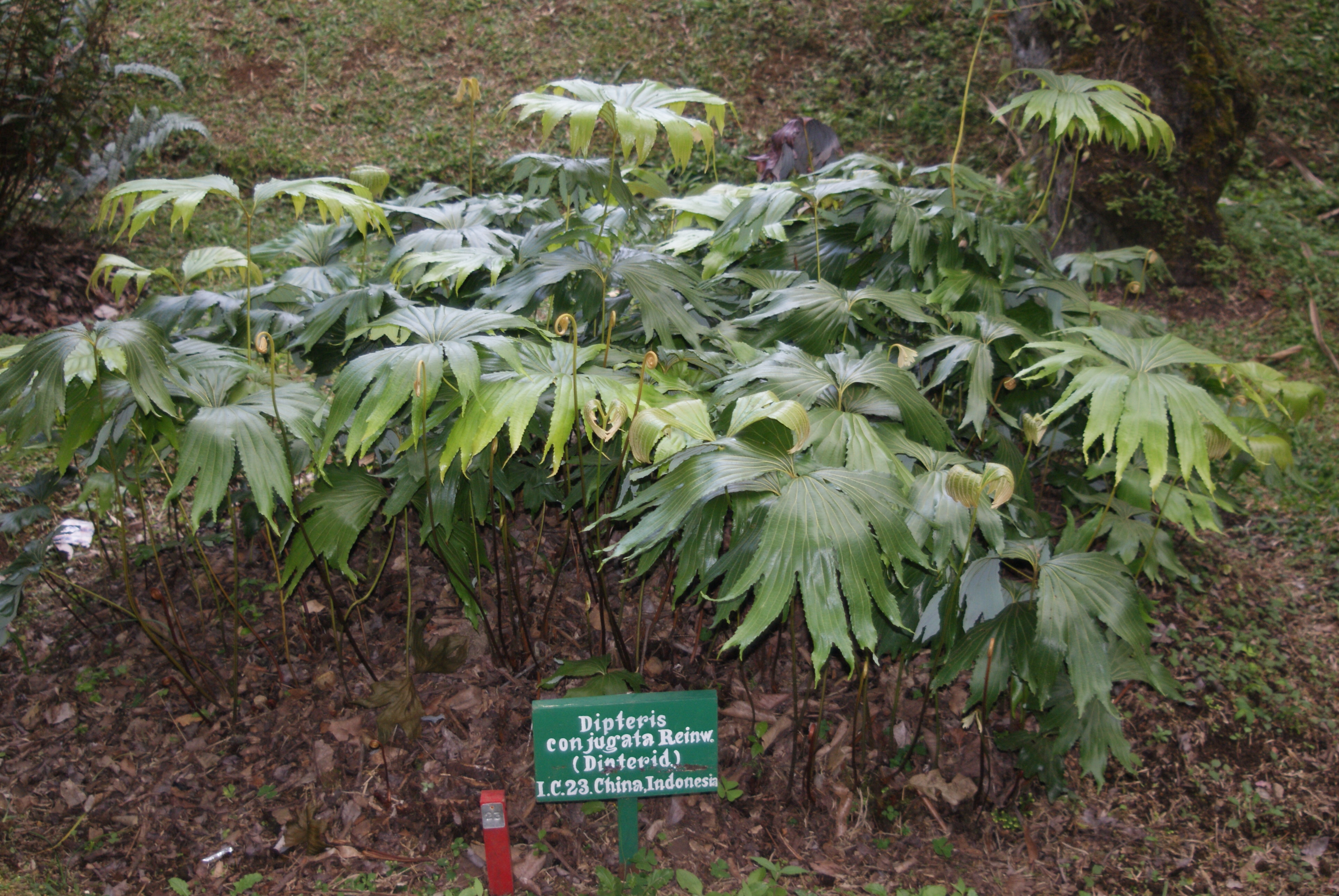
D.conjugata in Cibodas Botanical Garden, Indonesia

It is sometimes planted as an ornamental plant in Singapore.

It can be grown in poor to well drained soils and is mostly disease and pest resistant.

Also specimens of the plant can be found in Cibodas Botanical Garden in West Java of Indonesia, and in the Fernarium of Univerisiti Kebangsaan in Malaysia

== Uses ==
It has been used as a medicinal plant to treat various ailments, such as in southern Thailand, the roots have been collected for used in traditional medicine. In Fiji, it is used to treat male reproductive ailments.

It also has another use, in the highlands of Mindanao in the Philippines, the large fronds are used as an umbrella.

== Other sources ==
- de Winter, W. P. & V. B. Amoroso (eds.), 2003. Plant resources of South-East Asia No. 15(2). Cryptogams: Ferns and fern allies. Prosea Foundation, Borgor, Indonesia. 268 pp.
- Hnatiuk, R. J., 1990. Census of Australian vascular plants. Australian Flora and Fauna Series No. 11.
- Holttum, R. E., 1954. Plant life in Malaya. Longmans, Green & Co.. London. 254 pp.
- Holttum, R. E., 1966. A revised flora of Malaya. II Ferns of Malaya. Govt. Printing Office, Singapore (2nd ed.). 653 pp.
- Lim, S., P. Ng, L. Tan & Y. C. Wee, 1994. Rhythm of the sea - The life and times of Labrador beach. School of Science, National Technological University & Department of Botany, National University of Singapore.
- Parris, B. S., R. Khew, R. C. K. Chung, L. G. Saw & E. Soepadmo (eds.), 2010. Flora of Peninsular Malaysia. Series I: Ferns and Lycophytes. Vol. 1. Malayan Forest records No. 48. Forest Research Institute of Malaysia, Kepong. 249 pp.
- Smitinand, T. & K. Larsen, eds. 1970-. Flora of Thailand.
- Wee, Y. C., 2005. Ferns of the tropics. Times Editions-Marshall Cavendish, Singapore. 2nd ed. 190 pp.
- Wee, Y. C. & R. Hale, 2008. The Nature Society (Singapore) and the struggle to conserve Singapore's nature areas. Nature in Singapore 1: 41-49.
