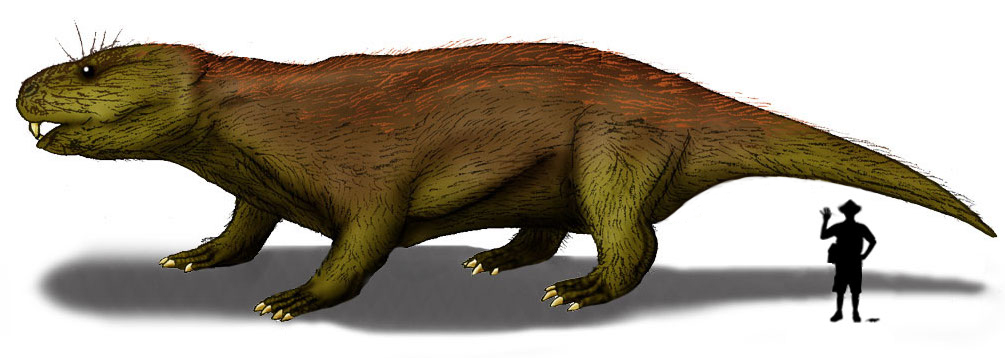

Scientific classification
- Kingdom: Animalia
- Phylum: Chordata
- Clade: Synapsida
- Clade: Therapsida
- Clade: Cynodontia
- Family: †Tritylodontidae
- Genus: †Bocatherium

Type species
- Bocatherium mexicanum Clark & Hopson, 1985

Species
- B. mexicanum (type species) Clark & Hopson, 1985

= Bocatherium =

Bocatherium Temporal range: Pliensbachian, 189.6–183.0 Ma

Extinct genus of mammaliamorphs

Bocatherium is an extinct genus of tritylodont mammaliamorphs from the Pliensbachian (Early Jurassic) of Tamaulipas, Mexico. It is known only from a skull found at the Huizachal Canyon locality, "a Pliensbachian floodplain siltstone in the La Boca Formation".
