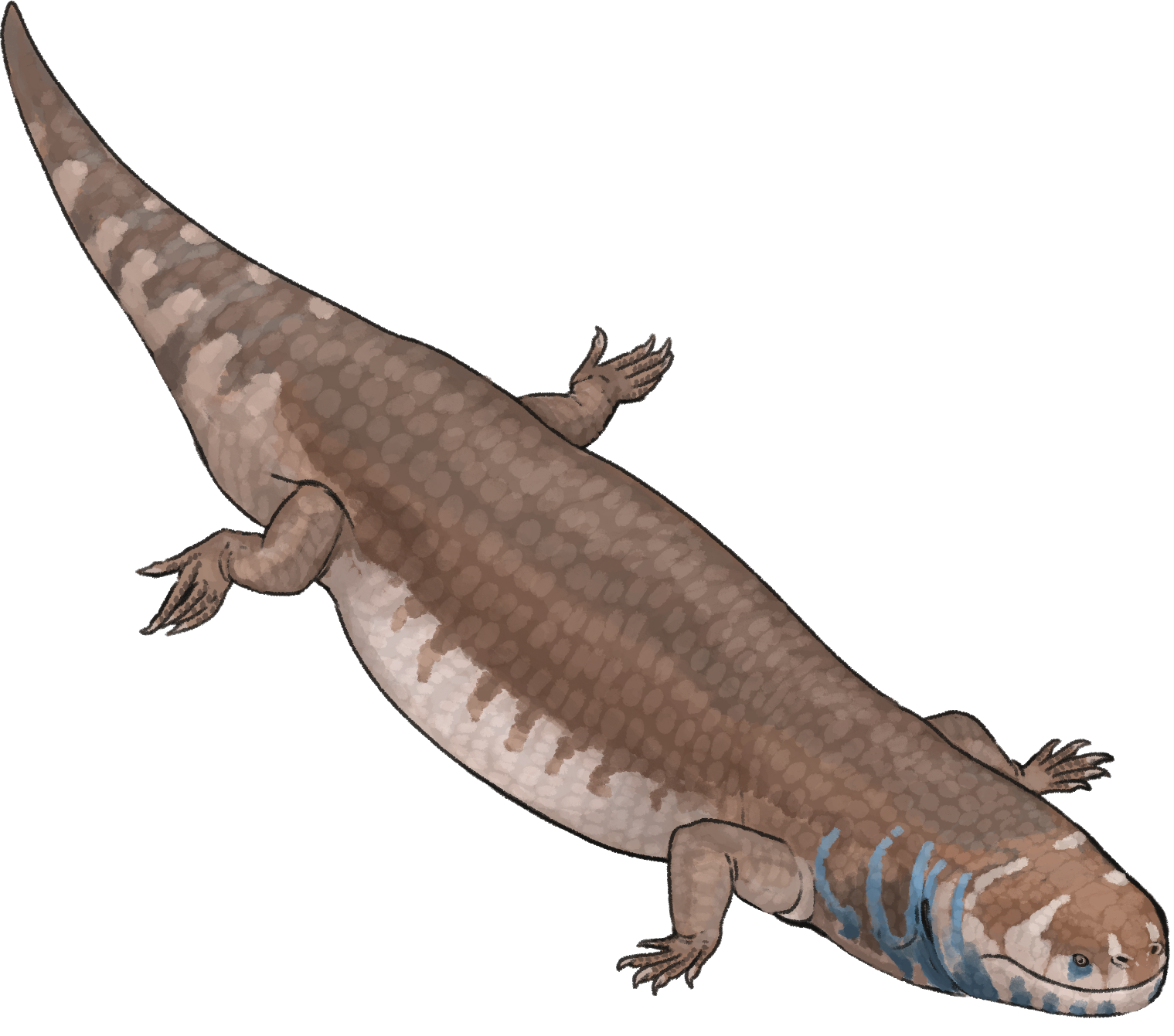
- Speculative Life Restoration

Scientific classification
- Domain: Eukaryota
- Kingdom: Animalia
- Phylum: Chordata
- Class: Reptilia
- Clade: Lepidosauromorpha
- Genus: †Tamaulipasaurus; Clark & Hernandez, 1994

Type species
- †Tamaulipasaurus morenoi Clark & Hernandez, 1994

= Tamaulipasaurus =

Tamaulipasaurus Temporal range: Early Jurassic, Toarcian

Extinct genus of reptiles

Tamaulipasaurus (meaning "Tamaulipas lizard") is an extinct genus of lepidosauromorph reptile from the Early Jurassic of Mexico. It contains a single species, Tamaulipasaurus morenoi, which is based on skull material found at Huizachal Canyon, a productive fossil site in the La Boca Formation. Tamaulipasaurus had an unusual condensed skull similar to that of amphisbaenians, a modern group of burrowing squamates. It also possessed a variety of plesiomorphic ("primitive") skull features indicating that it was not a true squamate. Nevertheless, other traits do support a position close to squamates, within the broader reptile group Lepidosauromorpha.
