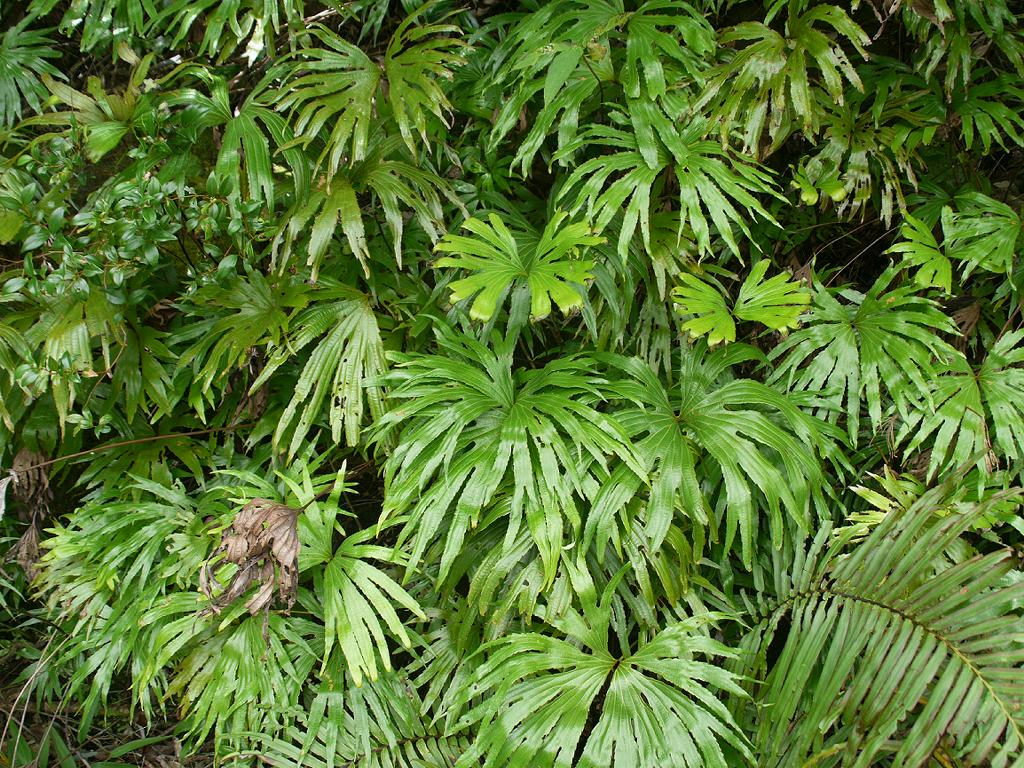
- Dipteris conjugata

Scientific classification
- Kingdom: Plantae
- Clade: Embryophytes
- Clade: Tracheophytes
- Division: Polypodiophyta
- Class: Polypodiopsida
- Order: Gleicheniales
- Family: Dipteridaceae; Seward & E.Dale 1901

Genera
- Cheiropleuria Presl 1851; Dipteris Reinw. 1825

Synonyms
- Cheiropleuriaceae Nakai 1928

= Dipteridaceae =

Umbrella ferns Temporal range: Middle Triassic–Recent

Family of ferns

The Dipteridaceae is a family of ferns in the order Gleicheniales of the class Polypodiopsida. They are commonly known as umbrella ferns and contain two genera, Cheiropleuria and Dipteris, with a total of nine species confined to Asia, New Guinea and northern Australia While currently a small family, they were much more abundant in the Mesozoic era, with the oldest fossils being known from the Middle Triassic of Italy, Australia and Argentina. A number of fossil genera are recognised, including Hausmannia, Clathropteris, Dictyophyllum, Sewardalea, Thaumatopteris, Camptopteris, Patagoniapteris, Goeppertella, and Polyphacelus.

The following diagram shows the placement of Dipteridaceae in a likely phylogenic relationship with the other two families of Gleicheniales.

- Gleicheniales
  - - Gleicheniaceae
      6 genera
  - - Matoniaceae
      2 genera
    - Dipteridaceae
      - Cheiropleuria – about 3 species
      - Dipteris – about 7 species
