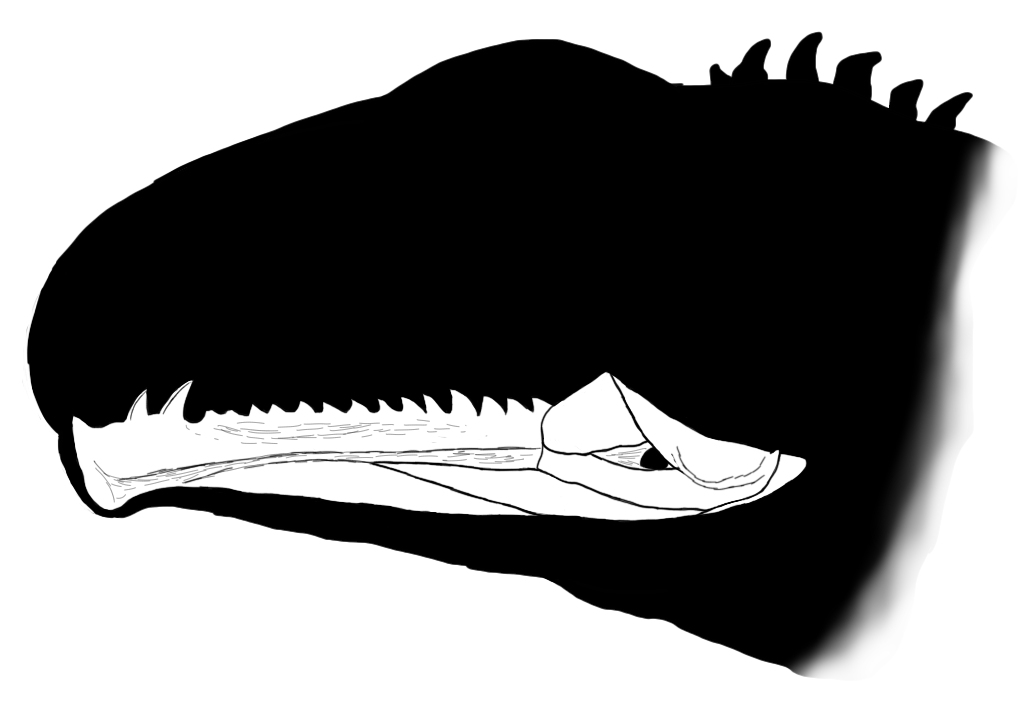
- A silhouette showing the jaw of Sphenovipera in medial view

Scientific classification
- Kingdom: Animalia
- Phylum: Chordata
- Class: Reptilia
- Order: Rhynchocephalia
- Suborder: Sphenodontia
- Infraorder: Eusphenodontia
- Clade: Neosphenodontia
- Family: Sphenodontidae
- Genus: †Sphenovipera; Reynoso, 2005

Species
- †S. jimmysjoyi Reynoso, 2005

= Sphenovipera =

Sphenovipera Temporal range: Early Jurassic

Extinct genus of reptiles

Sphenovipera jimmysjoyi is an extinct species of sphenodontian dated from the Jurassic. If was discovered in the lower part of the La Boca Formation located in Tamaulipas, Mexico. Only the lower jaw of this organism has been discovered and studied. It is possibly the only species of rhynchocephalian yet discovered to show evidence of venom delivery. The material was originally described as Middle Jurassic in age but La Boca Formation is now considered Early Jurassic in age.

== Etymology ==
Sphenovipera was named by Reynoso in 2005. The name alludes to sphenodontians via Spheno- and -vipera is Latin for "venomous snake."

== Description ==
Sphenovipera jimmysjoyi is only known from a single mostly complete mandible, around 6.2 millimetres (1/4 in) in length. The authors of the describing study stated that mandible has several characteristics indicative of venom delivery. This includes large curved fangs with grooves seen in other animals that use low-pressure venom delivery, such as colubrid snakes. The authors of the describing study also suggested that the gape was wider and the bite was weaker than that of other sphenodontians. The interpretation of Sphenovipera as venomous has been contested, with other authors noting that the grooves on the teeth are only shallow, and that the fangs teeth are unspecialised, and that the gape is unknowable without elements of the skull.

== Taxonomy ==
Sphenovipera is a member of Neosphenodontia. Some studies have placed it as a part of Sphenodontinae, while others have disputed this.
