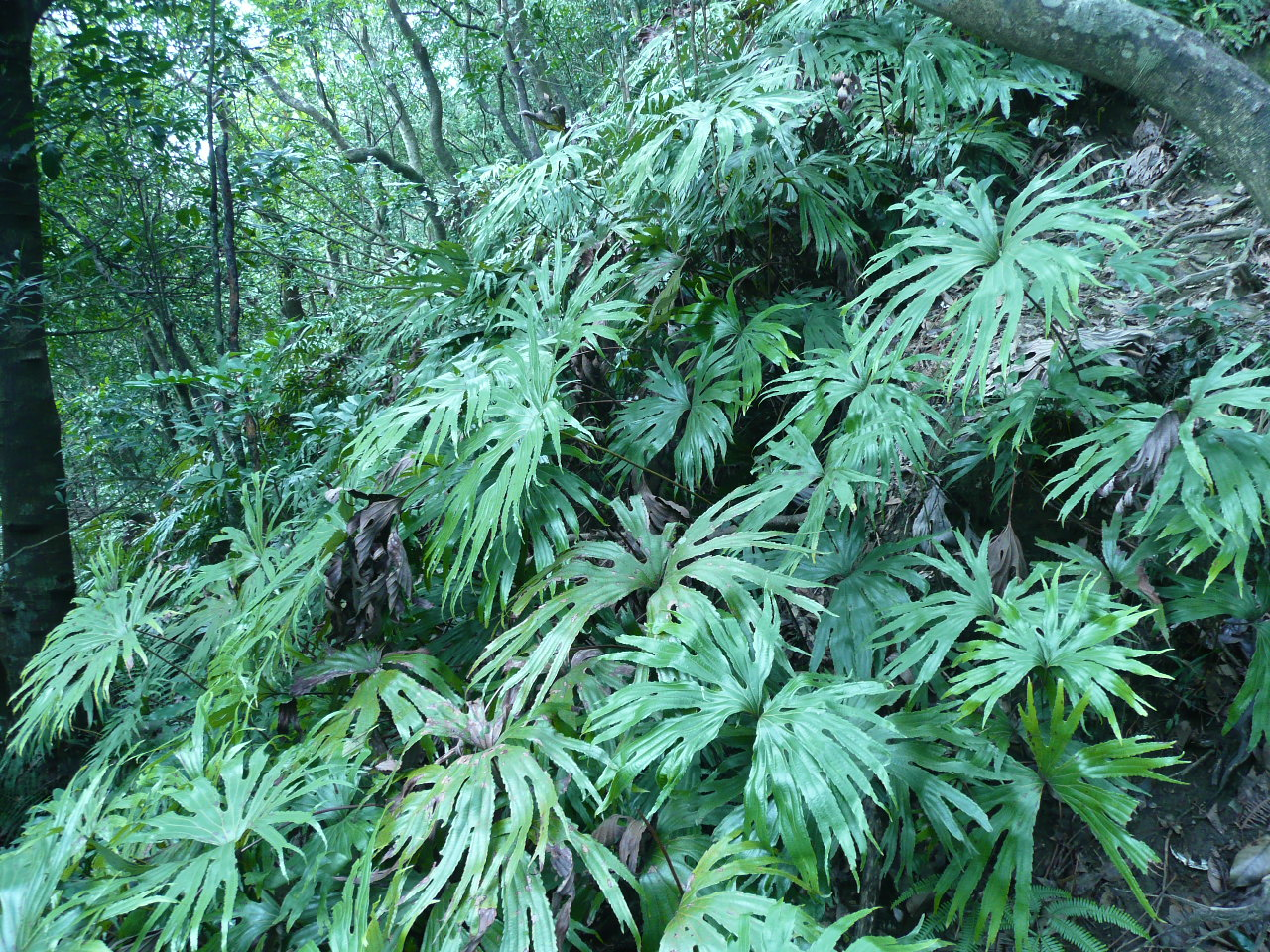
- Dipteris conjugata

Scientific classification
- Kingdom: Plantae
- Clade: Tracheophytes
- Division: Polypodiophyta
- Class: Polypodiopsida
- Order: Gleicheniales
- Family: Dipteridaceae
- Genus: Dipteris; Reinw.

Type species
- Dipteris conjugata Reinwardt

Species
- See text

Synonyms
- Phymatodes Presl

= Dipteris =

Genus of ferns

Dipteris is a genus of about seven species of ferns, native to tropical regions across the world, particularly Asia, with a species in northeastern Queensland in Australia. It is one of two genera in the family Dipteridaceae.

== Description ==
Species of Dipteris grow from creeping rhizomes, and have large stalks to the sporangium and annulus. The rhizomes have bristles (or hairs) and the fronds have uniseriate hairs (having one line or series). All species of Dipteris have spore-capsules that are carried on the lower surface of the broad lobed frond. The fronds can reach up to 50 cm long.

== Taxonomy ==
Caspar Georg Carl Reinwardt first published the genus in 1825, by describing Dipteris conjugata Reinw. which is the best known species.

In 1839, R. Brown reduced the genus to a subgenus of Polypodium. In 1901, Konrad Christ published Die Farnkrauter der Erde't, within which he included the genus Dipteris in the family Polypodiaceae, (a subdivision of the Polypodiacea). It was then later placed into a separate genus, Bower (1928), Ching (1940) and Pichi-Sermolli (1958) all having recreated the family Dipteridaceae, then comprising only one genus, Dipteris, due to the differences in sporangium, stomata and gametophyte.

The Latin genus name Dipteris refers to an amalgamation of two terms: di meaning two, and pteris Greek word used for ferns generally, meaning wing-like.

=== Taxonomy ===
Phylogeny of Dipteris

- - - D. conjugata Reinwardt
    - D. shenzhenensis Yan & Wei 2021
  - - D. wallichii (Brown ex Wallich 1828) Moore
    - - D. chinensis Christ
      - D. lobbiana (Hooker) Moore

As of October 2019, Plants of the World Online and the Checklist of Ferns and Lycophytes of the World recognized seven species:

- Dipteris chinensis Christ – Tropical Asia and Australasia
- Dipteris conjugata Reinw. – Indochina to Australia (Queensland), and some islands in the Pacific Ocean
- Dipteris lobbiana (Hook.) T. Moore
- Dipteris nieuwenhuisii Christ
- Dipteris novoguineensis Posth.
- Dipteris papilioniformis Kjellb.
- Dipteris wallichii (R. Br.) T. Moore – India, Cuba, Hispaniola

== Distribution and habitat ==
Many species are found in Malaysia, Philippines, Samoa and New Guinea, growing beside Matonia (another fern species). Most of the species grow on rocks, exposed places, clearings and in thickets.

== Fossils ==
The genus has been found to have been widely distributed during the Jurassic period, of the Mesozoic Era when much of the genus was widely distributed around Europe. Such fossils have been found in England, Germany, France, Belgium, Austria, Switzerland, Bornholm (island), Greenland, and Poland.

== Other sources ==
- Douglas Houghton Campbell, The Evolution of the Land Plants (Embryophyta), 1940
- Anil Kumar, Botany for Degree Pteridophyta, 2006
- Sir Arthur George Tansley, The New Phytologist, 1956
